= Diana Ross discography =

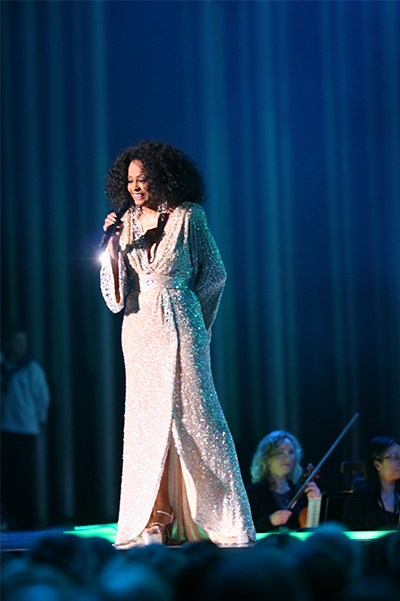
- Diana Ross performing at the 2008 Nobel Peace Prize concert in Oslo
- Studio albums: 26
- Extended plays: 1
- Soundtrack albums: 5
- Live albums: 5
- Compilation albums: 30
- Singles: 117

The discography of American pop-soul singer Diana Ross, the former lead singer of the Supremes, consists of 26 studio albums and 117 singles. Throughout her career, Ross has sold over 100 million records worldwide. Billboard ranked her as the 47th greatest artist of all time on the Billboard Hot 100 and the 11th greatest female artist on the Hot 100. In 1993, Guinness World Records named Ross the "most successful female charting artist in music history". Her 1980 album Diana remains the best-selling album of her career.

Between 1970 and 1986, Ross charted 40 songs on the Billboard Hot 100. 27 of those reached the top 40, including 12 top 10 hits with six reaching number one. "Endless Love" (1981), a duet with Lionel Richie spent nine consecutive weeks at number one and set a record for Ross as the female solo artist with the most number one pop singles, a record she held until 1988. Between 1970 and 2005, Ross charted 70 songs on the UK singles chart. 46 songs reached the top 40 including 19 top ten singles and two number ones.

33 of her albums charted on the Billboard 200, with 17 peaking inside the top 40. On the UK albums chart, Ross charted 46 albums with 32 reaching the top 40.

Ross sang lead on a UK top 75 hit single at least once every year for 33 consecutive years (1964-1996), a record for any perfomer. She is among a select group of artists whose albums and singles combined have spent more than 1,000 weeks on the official UK charts, with her singles totalling 573 weeks (10.9 years) and her albums spending a total of 634 weeks (12 years) on the charts. As of 2025, Ross has 29 certified BPI albums (7 Silver, 13 Gold, 8 Platinum and 1 Multi Platinum). Ross also has nine certified BPI singles (5 Silver, 1 Gold, 3 Platinum).

As Motown was not affiliated with the RIAA until 1978 her albums released before that date have never been certified in the US, although six of these sold enough to reach Gold status and one sold enough to reach Platinum.

== Albums ==
=== Studio albums ===
Title	Album details	Peak chart positions						Certifications
Title	Album details	US	US R&B	AUS	CAN	NL	UK	Certifications
Diana Ross	Released: June 19, 1970; Label: Motown	19	1	—	13	—	14	
Everything Is Everything	Released: November 3, 1970; Label: Motown	42	5	—	67	—	31	
Surrender	Released: July 6, 1971; Label: Motown	56	10	—	45	—	10	BPI: Silver
Touch Me in the Morning	Released: June 22, 1973; Label: Motown	5	1	20	5	—	7	BPI: Gold
Diana & Marvin (with Marvin Gaye)	Released: October 26, 1973; Label: Motown	26	7	26	55	—	6	BPI: Gold
Last Time I Saw Him	Released: December 6, 1973; Label: Motown	52	12	50	68	—	41	
Diana Ross	Released: February 10, 1976; Label: Motown	5	4	39	2	2	4	BPI: Gold
Baby It's Me	Released: September 16, 1977; Label: Motown	18	7	81	15	—	—	BPI: Silver
Ross	Released: September 3, 1978; Label: Motown	49	32	—	59	—	—	
The Boss	Released: May 23, 1979; Label: Motown	14	10	76	38	—	52	RIAA: Gold
Diana	Released: May 22, 1980; Label: Motown	2	1	17	8	4	12	RIAA: Platinum; BPI: Gold; MC: Platinum; NVPI: Gold
To Love Again	Released: February 17, 1981; Label: Motown	32	16	—	—	39	26	
Why Do Fools Fall in Love	Released: September 14, 1981; Label: RCA	15	4	47	33	3	17	RIAA: Platinum; BPI: Gold; MC: Gold; IFPI: Gold
Silk Electric	Released: September 10, 1982; Label: RCA	27	5	84	44	14	33	RIAA: Gold; BPI: Silver
Ross	Released: June 9, 1983; Label: RCA	32	14	59	57	27	44	
Swept Away	Released: September 13, 1984; Label: RCA	26	7	78	37	10	40	RIAA: Gold; MC: Gold
Eaten Alive	Released: September 24, 1985; Label: RCA	45	27	11	43	8	11	
Red Hot Rhythm & Blues	Released: May 8, 1987; Label: RCA	73	39	—	—	53	47	
Workin' Overtime	Released: June 6, 1989; Label: Motown	116	34	85	—	43	23	BPI: Silver
The Force Behind the Power	Released: September 10, 1991; Label: Motown	102	66	100	—	32	11	BPI: Platinum; RIAJ: Gold
A Very Special Season	Released: November 14, 1994; Label: EMI	—	—	—	—	93	37	BPI: Gold
Take Me Higher	Released: September 5, 1995; Label: Motown	114	38	—	—	48	10	
Every Day Is a New Day	Released: May 4, 1999; Label: Motown	108	47	—	—	—	73	
Blue	Released: June 20, 2006; Label: Motown	146	71	—	—	—	—	
I Love You	Released: October 2, 2006; Label: Manhattan	32	16	—	—	92	60	
Diana Ross Sings Songs from The Wiz	Released: November 27, 2015; Label: Universal	—	—	—	—	—	—	
Thank You	Released: November 5, 2021; Label: Decca	— (Note: "Thank You" did not enter the Billboard 200, but peaked at No. 16 on the Top Current Album Sales chart.)	— (Note: "Thank You" did not enter the Billboard Top R&B/Hip-Hop Albums chart, but peaked at No. 25 on the Top R&B Albums chart.)	185	—	42	7	
"—" denotes items which were not released in that country or failed to chart.

=== Soundtrack albums ===
Title	Album details	Peak chart positions						Certifications
Title	Album details	US	US R&B	AUS	CAN	NL	UK	Certifications
Diana!	Released: March 29, 1971; Label: Motown	46	3	—	40	—	43	
Lady Sings the Blues	Released: October 1972; Label: Motown	1	2	43	5	—	50	BPI: Gold
Mahogany	Released: October 1975; Label: Motown	19	15	59	5	10	—	
The Wiz	Released: September 18, 1978; Label: MCA	40	33	—	53	22	—	RIAA: Gold
Endless Love	Released: 1981; Label: Mercury	9	9	26	17	—	26	RIAA: Gold; BPI: Gold; MC: Gold
"—" denotes items which were not released in that country or failed to chart.

=== Live albums ===
Title	Album details	Peak chart positions						Certifications
Title	Album details	US	US R&B	AUS	CAN	NL	UK	Certifications
Live at Caesars Palace	Released: May 1974; Label: Motown	64	15	92	40	—	21	
An Evening with Diana Ross	Released: January 18, 1977; Label: Motown	29	14	—	21	—	52	BPI: Silver
Greatest Hits Live	Released: 1989; Label: EMI	—	—	—	—	72	34	BPI: Gold
Stolen Moments: The Lady Sings... Jazz and Blues	Released: April 1993; Label: Motown	—	73	141	—	—	45	
Christmas in Vienna (with Plácido Domingo & José Carreras)	Released: 1993; Label: Sony Classical	154	—	—	—	4	71	BMVI: Gold; IFPI AUT: Platinum; IFPI NOR: Gold; IFPI SWI: Gold; NVPI: 3× Platinum; SPA: Platinum
"—" denotes items which were not released in that country or failed to chart.

=== Compilation albums ===
Title	Album details	Peak chart positions						Certifications
Title	Album details	US	US R&B	AUS	CAN	NL	UK	Certifications
Greatest Hits	Released: 1972; Label: Motown	—	—	—	—	—	34	BPI: Gold
Diana Ross' Greatest Hits^{[A]}	Released: July 12, 1976; Label: Motown	13	10	47	6	—	2	BPI: Gold; MC: Gold
20 Golden Greats	Released: October 1979; Label: Motown	—	—	—	—	—	2	BPI: Platinum
All the Great Hits	Released: October 1981; Label: Motown	37	14	—	—	24	21	RIAA: Gold; BPI: Platinum; MC: Gold
Collection	Released: 1981; Label: Motown	—	—	27	—	—	—	
Diana's Duets	Released: January 29, 1982; Label: Motown	—	—	—	—	—	43	BPI: Silver
Love Songs	Released: November 1, 1982; Label: K-tel	—	—	—	—	—	5	BPI: Platinum
Anthology	Released: 1983; Label: Motown	63	44	—	—	—	—	
Portrait	Released: 1983; Label: Telstar	—	—	—	—	—	8	BPI: Gold
All the Great Love Songs	Released: 1984; Label: Motown	—	—	—	—	—	—	
Love Songs	Released: 1984; Label: Telstar	—	—	—	—	10	—	
Dance Songs	Released: 1985; Label: Telstar	—	—	—	—	24	—	
Love Songs (with Michael Jackson)	Released: September 1, 1987; Label: Telstar	—	—	86	—	—	12	BPI: Platinum
The Diana Ross Story	Released: 1988; Label: K-tel	—	—	40	—	—	—	
Motown's Greatest Hits	Released: 1992; Label: Motown	—	—	196	—	—	20	BPI: Silver
Forever Diana: Musical Memoirs	Released: 1993; Label: Motown	—	88	—	—	—	—	
One Woman: The Ultimate Collection	Released: October 1, 1993; Label: EMI	—	—	119	—	55	1	BPI: 4× Platinum; BEA: Platinum; SNEP: Gold
Diana Extended: The Remixes	Released: April 12, 1994; Label: Motown	—	68	—	—	—	58	
Voice of Love	Released: November 29, 1996; Label: EMI	—	—	—	—	—	42	BPI: Gold
Greatest Hits: The RCA Years	Released: 1997; Label: RCA	—	—	—	—	—	—	
40 Golden Motown Greats	Released: October 19, 1998; Label: Motown	—	—	—	—	—	35	BPI: Gold
Love & Life: The Very Best of Diana Ross	Released: January 15, 2001; Label: EMI	—	—	132	—	100	28	BPI: Platinum
Diana Ross & the Supremes: The No. 1's	Released: October 21, 2003; Label: Motown	72	63	—	—	18	15	BPI: Platinum; RMNZ: Platinum
Soul Legends	Released: 2006; Label: Universal	—	—	—	—	86	—	
The Definitive Collection	Released: August 29, 2006; Label: Hip-O	—	—	—	—	—	—	
Playlist Your Way	Released: 2008; Label: Motown	—	100	—	—	—	—	
Complete Collection	Released: 2009; Label: USM	—	—	—	—	5	—	
The Greatest	Released: November 7, 2011; Label: Universal	—	—	—	—	—	24	BPI: Platinum
Icon	Released: 2012; Label: Motown	—	72	—	—	—	—	
Upside Down: The Collection	Released: November 6, 2012; Label: Spectrum	—	—	—	—	—	—	
Playlist: The Very Best of Diana Ross	Released: May 21, 2013; Label: RCA	—	—	—	—	—	—	
Diamond Diana: The Legacy Collection	Released: November 17, 2017; Label: Motown	30	18	—	—	—	—	
Supertonic: Mixes	Released: May 29, 2020; Label: Motown	— (Note: "Supertonic: Mixes" did not enter the Billboard 200, but peaked at No. 66 on the Top Current Album Sales chart.)	—	—	—	—	—	
"—" denotes items which were not released in that country or failed to chart.

- ^{A} Diana Ross' Greatest Hits was released as Greatest Hits 2 in the UK.

=== Video albums ===
Title	Album details	Peak chart positions
Title	Album details	UK Music Videos
One Woman: The Video Collection	Released: 1993; Label: PMI, EMI; Formats: VHS	9

== Extended plays ==
Title	EP details
When You Dream	Released: March 23, 1995; Label: InsideOut

== Singles ==
=== 1970–1981 (Motown era) ===
Year	Single	Peak chart positions										Certifications/Sales	Album
Year	Single	US	US R&B	US A/C	US Dan	AUS	CAN	IRE	NL	NZ	UK	Certifications/Sales	Album
1970	"Reach Out and Touch (Somebody's Hand)"	20	7	18	—	56	23	—	—	—	33		Diana Ross
1970	"Ain't No Mountain High Enough"	1	1	6	—	25	7	14	—	—	6	BPI: Silver	Diana Ross
1970	"Remember Me"	16	10	20	—	—	9	—	—	—	7		Surrender
1971	"Reach Out I'll Be There"	29	17	16	—	—	35	—	—	—	—		Surrender
1971	"Surrender"	38	16	—	—	—	45	—	—	—	10		Surrender
1971	"I'm Still Waiting"	63	40	—	—	69	81	1	—	11	1		Everything Is Everything
1972	"Good Morning Heartache"	34	20	8	—	—	44	—	—	—	—		Lady Sings the Blues
1973	"Touch Me in the Morning"	1	5	1	—	5	6	—	—	11	9		Touch Me in the Morning
1973	"You're a Special Part of Me" (with Marvin Gaye)	12	4	43	—	—	25	—	—	—	—		Diana & Marvin
1973	"Last Time I Saw Him"	14	15	1	—	18	8	—	—	15	35		Last Time I Saw Him
1974	"My Mistake (Was to Love You)" (with Marvin Gaye)	19	15	—	—	—	16	—	—	—	—		Diana & Marvin
1974	"Sleepin'"	70	50	—	—	—	47	—	—	—	—		Last Time I Saw Him
1974	"Don't Knock My Love" (with Marvin Gaye)	46	25	—	—	—	53	—	—	—	—		Diana & Marvin
1975	"Theme from Mahogany (Do You Know Where You're Going To)"	1	14	1	—	38	4	2	4	19	5		Mahogany / Diana Ross
1976	"I Thought It Took a Little Time (But Today I Fell in Love)"	47	61	4	—	—	53	—	—	—	32		Diana Ross
1976	"Love Hangover"	1	1	19	— (Note: "Love Hangover" (1976) did not enter the Billboard Dance Club Songs chart, which started as a national chart after "Love Hangover" was released, but peaked at No. 1 on the Record World Disco File Top 20 chart.)	67	9	1	18	28	10		Diana Ross
1976	"One Love in My Lifetime"	25	10	31	—	—	24	—	—	—	—		Diana Ross
1977	"Gettin' Ready for Love"	27	16	8	—	—	29	—	—	—	23		Baby It's Me
1978	"Your Love Is So Good for Me"	49	16	—	15	—	66	—	—	—	—		Baby It's Me
1978	"Top of the World"	—	—	—	15	—	—	—	—	—	—		Baby It's Me
1978	"You Got It"	49	39	9	—	—	67	—	—	—	—		Baby It's Me
1978	"Ease On down the Road" (with Michael Jackson)	41	17	40	—	—	35	—	33	—	45		The Wiz
1978	"What You Gave Me"	—	86	—	35	—	—	—	—	—	—		Ross
1979	"The Boss"	19	12	41	1	—	48	—	—	—	40		The Boss
1979	"No One Gets the Prize"	—	—	—	1	—	—	—	—	—	59		The Boss
1979	"It's My House"	—	27	—	1	71	—	—	—	—	32		The Boss
1980	"Upside Down"	1	1	18	1	1	5	3	3	1	2	RIAA: Gold; BPI: Platinum; MC: Platinum; NVPI: Gold; RMNZ: Platinum	Diana
1980	"I'm Coming Out"	5	6	—	1	40	68	8	18	5	13	BPI: Platinum; MC: Platinum; RMNZ: Platinum	Diana
1980	"My Old Piano"	— (Note: "My Old Piano" did not enter the Billboard Hot 100, but peaked at No. 9 on the Bubbling Under Hot 100 Singles chart.)	—	—	—	25	—	4	2	—	5	BPI: Silver	Diana
1980	"It's My Turn"	9	14	9	—	97	—	17	31	—	16		To Love Again
1981	"One More Chance"	79	54	—	—	—	—	—	—	—	49		To Love Again
1981	"Cryin' My Heart Out for You"	—	—	—	—	—	—	—	—	—	58		To Love Again
1981	"Endless Love" (with Lionel Richie)	1	1	1	—	1	1	9	10	3	7	RIAA: Platinum; ARIA: Platinum; BPI: Platinum; MC: Platinum; RMNZ: Platinum	Endless Love
"—" denotes the single failed to chart or was not released

Other charted songs

Year	Single	Peak chart positions							Album
Year	Single	US	US R&B	US A/C	US Dan	CAN	NZ	UK	Album
1975	"Sorry Doesn't Always Make It Right" ^{[B]}	—	—	17	—	75	16	23	Non-album release
1978	"Lovin', Livin' and Givin'"	—	—	—	35	—	—	54	Thank God It's Friday / Ross
1979	"Pops, We Love You" (with Marvin Gaye, Stevie Wonder & Smokey Robinson)	59	26	—	—	60	—	66	"Pops We Love You"...The Album
The following singles were released after Ross left Motown.
1982	"We Can Never Light That Old Flame Again" ^{[C]}	—	—	—	—	—	—	—	Non-album release
1986	"Ain't No Mountain High Enough" (re-release) ^{[D]}	—	—	—	—	—	—	85	Diana Ross / Surrender
"—" denotes the single failed to chart or was not released

- ^{B} "Sorry Doesn't Always Make It Right" was originally released as Motown US & UK single, February 1975, b/w "Together". Later it was included on the album Ross (1978).
- ^{C} The first released version of "We Can Never Light That Old Flame Again" was a non-album single in 1982, and was remixed by Berry Gordy and James Anthony Carmichael. Then it was included on the Deluxe Edition of the album Diana.
- ^{D} "Ain't No Mountain High Enough" was re-release as a single for the US CD release, the 1986 Motown two-for-one "2 All Time Great Classic Albums" Ain't No Mountain High Enough/Surrender.

International singles (not released in the US)

Year	Single	Peak chart positions			Certifications	Album
Year	Single	IRE	NL	UK	Certifications	Album
1972	"Doobedood'ndoobe, Doobedood'ndoobe, Doobedood'ndoo"	—	—	12		Everything Is Everything
1973	"All of My Life"	—	—	9		Touch Me in the Morning
1974	"You Are Everything" (with Marvin Gaye)	20	13	5	BPI: Silver	Diana & Marvin
1974	"Stop, Look, Listen (To Your Heart)" (with Marvin Gaye)	—	—	25		Diana & Marvin
1974	"Love Me"	—	—	38		Last Time I Saw Him
1976	"I'm Still Waiting" (re-release)	—	—	41		Everything Is Everything
1979	"A Brand New Day" (as The Wiz Stars featuring Diana Ross & Michael Jackson)	—	1	—		The Wiz
The following singles were released after Ross left Motown.
1982	"Tenderness"	—	37	73		Diana
1982	"Old Funky Rolls"	—	—	—		Non-album release
"—" denotes the single failed to chart or was not released

=== 1981–1988 (RCA era) ===
- Releases internationally were on Capitol Records.

Year	Single	Peak chart positions										Certifications	Album
Year	Single	US	US R&B	US A/C	US Dan	AUS	CAN	IRE	NL	NZ	UK	Certifications	Album
1981	"Why Do Fools Fall in Love"	7	6	2	—	15	17	9	1	3	4	BPI: Silver	Why Do Fools Fall in Love
1982	"Mirror, Mirror"	8	2	—	14	—	29	—	24	15	36		Why Do Fools Fall in Love
1982	"Work That Body"	44	34	—	14	—	—	10	15	—	7		Why Do Fools Fall in Love
1982	"Muscles"	10	4	36	—	50	18	23	10	18	15		Silk Electric
1983	"So Close"	40	76	13	—	—	—	25	—	—	43		Silk Electric
1983	"Pieces of Ice"	31	15	—	17	73	—	—	—	—	46		Ross
1983	"Up Front"	—	60	—	—	—	—	—	—	—	—		Ross
1983	"Let's Go Up"	77	52	—	—	—	—	—	—	—	—		Ross
1984	"All of You" (with Julio Iglesias) ^{[E]}	19	38	2	—	19	8	23	7	10	43	MC: Gold	1100 Bel Air Place / Swept Away
1984	"Swept Away"	19	3	—	1	—	17	—	36	—	—		Swept Away
1984	"Missing You"	10	1	4	—	95	29	—	—	—	76		Swept Away
1985	"Telephone"	—	13	—	—	—	—	—	—	—	—		Swept Away
1985	"Eaten Alive"	77	10	—	3	81	79	29	17	26	71		Eaten Alive
1985	"Chain Reaction"	95	85	25	—	1	35	1	40	3	1	BPI: Gold	Eaten Alive
1986	"Chain Reaction" (Special New Mix) ^{[F]}	66	—	—	7	—	40	—	—	—	—		Non-album release
1987	"Dirty Looks"	—	12	—	—	—	88	—	60	—	49		Red Hot Rhythm & Blues
1987	"Tell Me Again"	—	—	—	—	—	—	—	—	—	—		Red Hot Rhythm & Blues
"—" denotes the single failed to chart or was not released

- ^{E} "All of You" was originally planned as a duet for Iglesias' album 1100 Bel Air Place. According to writer J. Randy Taraborrelli in Diana Ross: A Biography, "The third track on side two of the album was originally 'Fight For It' (the B-side of 'Swept Away'). With the success of 'All Of You,' RCA got clearance from CBS to include it in place of 'Fight For It'" (515).
- ^{F} A remixed version of "Chain Reaction" was issued as a single. This version is not included on any RCA album by Diana Ross.

International singles (not released in the US)

Year	Single	Peak chart positions					Album
Year	Single	AUS	CAN	IRE	NL	UK	Album
1982	"It's Never Too Late"	—	—	—	—	41	Why Do Fools Fall in Love
1983	"Who"	—	—	—	44	—	Silk Electric
1983	"Up Front" (Jolley & Swain Remix) ^{[G]}	—	—	—	—	79	Non-album release
1984	"Touch by Touch"	—	18	—	17	47	Swept Away
1985	"Experience"	64	—	14	45	47	Eaten Alive
1987	"Shockwaves"	—	—	—	—	76	Red Hot Rhythm & Blues
1988	"Mr. Lee"	—	—	—	—	58	Red Hot Rhythm & Blues
"—" denotes the single failed to chart or was not released

- ^{G} "Up Front" was remixed by Jolley & Swain for its European release. The original version was included on the album Ross (1983).

=== 1988–2001 (Motown II era) ===
- Releases in the UK were on EMI, which like Motown was eventually acquired by Universal Music Group.

Year	Single	Peak chart positions								Certifications	Album
Year	Single	US Under	US R&B	US A/C	US Dan	AUS	IRE	NL	UK	Certifications	Album
1989	"Workin' Overtime"	—	3	—	11	88	28	—	32		Workin' Overtime
1989	"This House" / "Paradise"	—	64	—	11	117	—	—	61		Workin' Overtime
1989	"Bottom Line"	—	—	—	—	—	—	—	—		Workin' Overtime
1991	"When You Tell Me That You Love Me"	—	37	26	—	83	4	4	2	BPI: Silver	The Force Behind the Power
1991	"You're Gonna Love It"	—	—	—	24	—	—	—	—		The Force Behind the Power
1992	"Waiting in the Wings"	—	—	—	—	—	—	—	—		The Force Behind the Power
1993	"The Best Years of My Life"	—	—	—	—	—	—	—	28		Forever Diana / One Woman
1994	"Someday We'll Be Together" (Remix)	—	—	—	7	—	—	—	—		Diana Extended: The Remixes
1995	"Take Me Higher"	14	77	—	1	122	—	—	32		Take Me Higher
1995	"Gone"	—	107	—	—	—	—	—	36		Take Me Higher
1996	"If You're Not Gonna Love Me Right" /	—	67	—	—	—	—	—	—		Take Me Higher
1996	"Voice of the Heart"	—	—	28	—	—	—	—	—		Take Me Higher
1999	"Until We Meet Again"	—	— (Note: "Until We Meet Again" did not enter the Billboard Hot R&B/Hip-Hop Songs, but peaked at No. 73 on the Hot R&B/Hip-Hop Singles Sales chart.)	—	2	—	—	—	—		Every Day Is a New Day
1999	"Every Day Is a New Day"	—	—	—	—	—	—	—	—		Every Day Is a New Day
"—" denotes the single failed to chart or was not released

Other charted songs (US)

Year	Single	Peak chart positions			Album
Year	Single	US R&B	US A/C	US Dan	Album
1988	"If We Hold on Together" ^{[H]}	—	23	—	The Land Before Time: Original Motion Picture Soundtrack
1989	"Love Hangover '89"	—	—	3	Non-album release
1991	"No Matter What You Do" (with Al B. Sure!) ^{[H]}	4	—	—	Private Times...and the Whole 9!
1996	"I Will Survive" ^{[J]}	—	—	37	Take Me Higher
1999	"Sugarfree" ^{[K]}	121	—	—	Every Day Is a New Day
"—" denotes the single failed to chart or was not released

- ^{H} These singles were special releases that later were included in her discography.
- ^{J} "I Will Survive" hadn't been officially released as a single in the US, when it charted at Billboard Hot Dance Club Songs.
- ^{K} "Sugarfree" was never released as a single. It gained some R&B airplay and peaked at No. 21 on the Billboard Bubbling Under R&B/Hip-Hop Songs Chart.

International singles (not released in the US)

Year	Single	Peak chart positions			Album
Year	Single	IRE	NL	UK	Album
1988	"Love Hangover" (PWL '88 Remix)	—	—	75	Non-album release
1990	"I'm Still Waiting" (Phil Chill 1990 Edited Remix)	15	—	21	Non-album release
1991	"Battlefield"	—	—	—	The Force Behind the Power
1992	"The Force Behind the Power"	—	—	27	The Force Behind the Power
1992	"One Shining Moment"	16	—	10	The Force Behind the Power
1992	"If We Hold on Together"	25	36	11	The Force Behind the Power
1992	"Heart (Don't Change My Mind)"	—	—	31	The Force Behind the Power
1993	"That's Why I Call You My Friend"	—	—	—	That's Why I Call You My Friend
1993	"Chain Reaction '93"	26	—	20	Non-album release
1993	"Your Love"	—	—	14	One Woman: The Ultimate Collection
1994	"Why Do Fools Fall in Love" / "I'm Coming Out" (Remix)	—	—	36	Non-album release
1996	"I Will Survive"	—	—	14	Take Me Higher
1996	"In the Ones You Love"	—	—	34	Voice of Love
1997	"Promise Me You'll Try"	—	—	—	Gift of Love
1999	"Not Over You Yet"	—	74	9	Every Day Is a New Day
2001	"Goin' Back"	—	82	—	Love & Life: The Very Best of Diana Ross
"—" denotes the single failed to chart or was not released

=== 2002–present ===
Year	Single	Peak chart positions					Album
Year	Single	US A/C	US Dan	IRE	NL	UK	Album
2005	"When You Tell Me That You Love Me" (with Westlife)	—	—	2	45	2	Face to Face
2006	"I've Got a Crush on You" (with Rod Stewart)	19	—	—	—	—	The Great American Songbook
2006	"What a Diff'rence a Day Makes"	—	—	—	—	—	The Blue Album
2017	"Ain't No Mountain High Enough 2017" (Remix)	—	1	—	—	—	Diamond Diana: The Legacy Collection / Supertonic: Mixes
2018	"I'm Coming Out / Upside Down 2018" (Remix)	—	1	—	—	—	Supertonic: Mixes
2019	"The Boss 2019" (Remix)	—	1	—	—	—	Supertonic: Mixes
2020	"Love Hangover 2020" (Remix)	—	1	—	—	—	Supertonic: Mixes
2021	"Thank You"	—	—	—	—	— (Note: "Thank You" did not enter the UK Singles Chart, but peaked at number 32 on the UK Singles Downloads Chart and number 35 on the UK Official Singles Sales Chart Top 100.)	Thank You
2021	"If the World Just Danced"	—	—	—	—	— (Note: "If the World Just Danced" did not enter the UK Singles Chart, but peaked at number 56 on the UK Singles Downloads Chart and number 57 on the UK Official Singles Sales Chart Top 100.)	Thank You
2022	"Turn Up the Sunshine" (featuring Tame Impala)	19	—	—	—	— (Note: "Turn Up The Sunshine" did not enter the UK Singles Chart, but peaked at number 57 on the UK Singles Downloads Chart.)	Minions: The Rise of Gru
2026	"Upside Down" (Re-entry)	—	—	21	—	26	Diana
"—" denotes the single failed to chart or was not released

Dance Club Play chart entries From the inception of the Billboard Dance Club Play chart (also known as Club Play Singles, and formerly known as Hot Dance Club Play and Hot Dance/Disco) until the week of February 16, 1991, several (or even all) songs on an EP or album could occupy the same position if more than one track from a release was receiving significant play in clubs. Beginning with the February 23, 1991 issue, the dance chart became "song specific", meaning only one song could occupy each position at a time. Therefore;

- "Your Love Is So Good for Me" and "Top of the World" was a double A-side 12" single, so these two count as one No. 15 on this chart.
- "Lovin', Livin' and Givin'" and "What You Gave Me" was a double A-side 12" single, so these two also count as one No. 35 on this chart.
- "The Boss", "No One Gets the Prize" and "It's My House" all appear on Ross' The Boss album, so these three count as one No. 1 on the Club Play chart.
- "Upside Down" and "I'm Coming Out" was a double A-side 12" single, so these two also count as one No. 1 on this chart.
- "Mirror, Mirror" and "Work That Body" was a double A-side 12" single, so these two also count as one No. 14 on this chart.

== Notes ==
- US chart positions below No. 100 were compiled from Billboard magazine's Bubbling Under Hot 100 Singles and Bubbling Under R&B/Hip-Hop Singles charts.

== See also ==
- The Supremes discography
- List of best-selling music artists
- List of number-one hits (United States)
- List of artists who reached number one in the United States
- List of number-one dance hits (United States)
- List of artists who reached number one on the U.S. dance chart
