= Love & Life: The Very Best of Diana Ross =

Greatest hits album by Diana Ross
- Released: January 15, 2001
- Label: EMI
- Producer: Various

Diana Ross chronology
Every Day Is a New Day (1999)	Love & Life: The Very Best of Diana Ross (2001)	Blue (2006)

Singles from Love & Life: The Very Best of Diana Ross
- 1. "Goin' Back" Released: 2001

Love & Life: The Very Best of Diana Ross is a compilation album by American singer Diana Ross. It was released by EMI in 2001. The double disc, 41-track album, which was not released commercially in the United States, details Ross' career as a solo artist and with The Supremes. Also included are duets with singers Lionel Richie, Marvin Gaye, and R&B band The Temptations ("I'm Gonna Make You Love Me" sung with The Supremes). A single-disc edition of Love & Life: The Very Best of Diana Ross was also released, featuring Ross' 1995 cover of "I Will Survive."

The album became a top thirty success in the United Kingdom, where it peaked it number 28 on the UK Albums Chart, and was eventually certified platinum by the British Phonographic Industry (BPI) for sales in excess of 300,000 copies. The only new track in the set, a cover of the Goffin-King song "Goin' Back," a 1966 international hit for English singer Dusty Springfield, recorded especially for this collection and served as a single in several markets.

== Critical reception ==
Professional ratings
Review scores
Source	Rating
AllMusic	4/5 stars

AllMusic editor Andrew Hamilton called the compilation a "splendid [...] very comprehensive and thoughtfully chosen package [...] This is as good as it gets. Compiling a more complete and pleasing package with the same number of tracks to work with will never happen. The circus-sounding "The Happening" is a nuisance, but you can skip or program it out entirely if it bothers you."

== Track listings ==
=== Double disc edition ===
Disc One: Life
No.	Title	Writer(s)	Original album	Length
1.	"Chain Reaction"	Barry Gibb; Robin Gibb; Maurice Gibb	Eaten Alive (1985)	3:48
2.	"Baby Love" (The Supremes)	Holland–Dozier–Holland	Where Did Our Love Go (1964)	2:36
3.	"Where Did Our Love Go" (The Supremes)	Holland–Dozier–Holland	Where Did Our Love Go (1964)	2:35
4.	"You Can't Hurry Love" (The Supremes)	Holland–Dozier–Holland	The Supremes A' Go-Go (1966)	2:54
5.	"Stop! In the Name of Love" (The Supremes)	Holland–Dozier–Holland	More Hits by The Supremes (1965)	2:53
6.	"You Keep Me Hangin' On" (The Supremes)	Holland–Dozier–Holland	The Supremes Sing Holland–Dozier–Holland (1967)	2:54
7.	"The Happening" (The Supremes)	Holland–Dozier–Holland	Greatest Hits (1967)	2:52
8.	"Reflections" (Diana Ross & The Supremes)	Holland–Dozier–Holland	Reflections (1968)	2:52
9.	"Love Hangover" (7" edit)	Marilyn McLeod; Pam Sawyer	Diana Ross (1976)	3:45
10.	"The Boss"	Nile Rodgers; Bernard Edwards	The Boss (1979)	3:58
11.	"Why Do Fools Fall in Love"	Frankie Lymon; George Goldner	Why Do Fools Fall in Love (1981)	2:55
12.	"Mirror, Mirror"	Dennis Matkosky; Michael Sembello	Why Do Fools Fall in Love (1981)	4:05
13.	"Muscles"	Michael Jackson	Silk Electric (1982)	4:03
14.	"Work That Body"	Diana Ross; Paul Jabara; Ray Chew	Why Do Fools Fall in Love (1981)	3:36
15.	"The Force Behind the Power"	Stevie Wonder	The Force Behind the Power (1991)	4:04
16.	"Wokin' Overtime"	Rodgers; Edwards	Workin' Overtime (1989)	4:17
17.	"Take Me Higher"	Narada Michael Walden; Sally Jo Dakota; Nikita Germaine	Take Me Higher (1995)	4:19
18.	"Until We Meet Again" (Hex Hector remix)	Denise Rich; Gen Rubin	Every Day Is a New Day (1999)	3:53
19.	"Not Over You Yet" (Metro radio edit)	Malik Pendleton; Kenneth Kelly	Every Day Is a New Day (1999)	4:04
20.	"I'm Coming Out"	Rodgers; Edwards	diana (1980)	3:56
21.	"Upside Down"	Rodgers; Edwards	diana (1980)	4:06
22.	"My Old Piano"	Rodgers; Edwards	diana (1980)	3:57

Disc Two: Love
No.	Title	Writer(s)	Original album	Length
1.	"You Are Everything" (with Marvin Gaye)	Thom Bell; Linda Creed	Diana & Marvin (1973)	3:09
2.	"Touch Me in the Morning"	Michael Masser; Ron Miller	Touch Me in the Morning (1973)	3:27
3.	"Theme from Mahogany (Do You Know Where You're Going To)"	Masser; Gerry Goffin	Mahogany soundtrack (1975)	3:25
4.	"I'm Still Waiting"	Deke Richards	Everything Is Everything (1971)	3:43
5.	"Ain't No Mountain High Enough"	Nickolas Ashford; Valerie Simpson	Diana Ross (1970)	3:30
6.	"I'm Gonna Make You Love Me" (with The Supremes & The Temptations)	Kenny Gamble; Leon Huff; Jerry Ross	Diana Ross & the Supremes Join the Temptations (1968)	3:07
7.	"Someday We'll Be Together"	Johnny Bristol; Jackey Beavers; Harvey Fuqua	Cream of the Crop (1969)	3:26
8.	"Remember Me"	Ashford; Simpson	diana (1980)	3:30
9.	"Stop, Look, Listen (To Your Heart)" (with Marvin Gaye)	Bell; Creed	Diana & Marvin (1973)	2:55
10.	"Good Morning Heartache"	Irene Higginbotham; Ervin Drake; Dan Fisher	Lady Sings the Blues (1972)	2:22
11.	"It's My Turn"	Masser; Carole Bayer Sager	It's My Turn soundtrack (1980)	3:59
12.	"One Shining Moment"	Masser; Goffin	The Force Behind the Power (1991)	4:46
13.	"In the Ones You Love"	Liz Vidal; Marsha Malamet	Voice of Love (1996)	4:17
14.	"Your Love"	David Friedman	One Woman: The Ultimate Collection (1993)	4:03
15.	"The Best Years of My Life"	Will Jennings; Allen Davis	One Woman: The Ultimate Collection (1993)	4:23
16.	"Goin' Back"	Goffin; Carole King	previously unreleased	3:40
17.	"If We Hold On Together"	James Horner; Will Jennings	The Land Before Time soundtrack (1988) & The Force Behind the Power (1991)	4:10
18.	"When You Tell Me That You Love Me"	Albert Hammond; John Bettis	The Force Behind the Power (1991)	4:12
19.	"Endless Love" (with Lionel Richie)	Richie	Endless Love soundtrack (1981)	4:27

=== Single disc edition ===
No.	Title	Length
1.	"You Can’t Hurry Love" (with The Supremes)	2:54
2.	"Ain't No Mountain High Enough"	3:30
3.	"You Keep Me Hangin’ On" (& The Supremes)	2:54
4.	"I’m Still Waiting"	3:43
5.	"Touch Me In The Morning"	3:27
6.	"You Are Everything"	3:07
7.	"Love Hangover"	3:45
8.	"Upside Down"	4:06
9.	"I’m Coming Out"	3:56
10.	"Do You Know Where You’re Going To?"	3:25
11.	"Mirror, Mirror"	4:05
12.	"Muscles"	4:03
13.	"Work That Body"	3:36
14.	"Endless Love" (with Lionel Richie)	4:27
15.	"Why Do Fools Fall In Love"	2:55
16.	"Chain Reaction"	3:48
17.	"When You Tell Me That You Love Me"	4:12
18.	"One Shining Moment"	4:46
19.	"I Will Survive"	3:49
20.	"Not Over You Yet" (Metro Radio Edit)	4:04
21.	"Goin’ Back"	3:40

== Charts ==
=== Weekly charts ===
Weekly chart performance for Love & Life: The Very Best of Diana Ross
Chart (2001-2006)	Peak position
Australian Albums (ARIA)	132
French Compilation Albums (SNEP)	30
Scottish Albums (Official Charts)	28
Swedish Albums (Sverigetopplistan)	34
UK Albums (Official Charts)	28

=== Year-end charts ===
Year-end chart performance for Love & Life: The Very Best of Diana Ross
Chart (2001)	Position
UK Albums (OCC)	171

== Certifications ==
Region	Certification	Certified units/sales
United Kingdom (BPI)	Platinum	300,000^{‡}
^{‡} Sales+streaming figures based on certification alone.
