= Forever Diana: Musical Memoirs =

Box set by Diana Ross
- Released: October 5, 1993
- Recorded: 1962–1993
- Genre: Pop, soul, disco
- Label: Motown

Diana Ross chronology
Stolen Moments: The Lady Sings... Jazz and Blues (1993)	Forever Diana: Musical Memoirs (1993)	One Woman: The Ultimate Collection (1993)

Singles from Forever Diana: Musical Memoirs
- 1. "The Best Years of My Life" Released: November 9, 1993

Professional ratings
Review scores
Source	Rating
AllMusic	3/5 stars
Music Week	4/5 stars

Forever Diana: Musical Memoirs is a four-CD box set of recordings by American singer Diana Ross released on October 5, 1993 by Motown Records.

In addition to all of her eighteen #1 hits, the seventy-eight track set contained five previously unreleased tracks.

Disc 1 collects Ross' greatest hits with The Supremes from 1962 to 1969, disc 2 covers her early solo career from her eponymous debut album through to the 1978 soundtrack The Wiz, disc 3 her disco era hits with Chic and her recordings for the RCA label up until 1985's "Chain Reaction", all in chronological order. Disc 4 mainly features tracks from Ross' then most recent studio albums Workin' Overtime (1989) and The Force Behind the Power (1991) together with five newly recorded tracks as well as three previously unreleased live recordings.

While Forever Diana: Musical Memoirs undoubtedly is the most comprehensive retrospective of Ross' career to date, with its seventy-seven tracks and a total running time of near 300 minutes, the box set received mixed reviews from both fans and music critics on its release, mainly for omitting a number of her greatest hits and signature tunes from the 1970s and 1980s - including no tracks from either 1983's Ross or 1987's Red Hot Rhythm & Blues - but also for using edited 7" versions of both "Ain't No Mountain High Enough" and "Love Hangover" instead of the original full-length album versions that have been featured on a number of other best of compilations issued by Motown Records/Universal Music both before and since. Additional controversy erupted due to the faulty mastering of the Mono singles featured on the album, resulting in uneven sound quality that was so disappointing, Motown had to recall the first pressings.

There is an error on many of the pressings of Disc 2. Instead of the listed track "Surrender", the track that was actually included is "I Can't Give Back The Love I Feel For You", which was a track featured on the 1971 album Surrender.

The box-set was duly promoted with her New York Times Best Seller autobiography, Secrets of a Sparrow. The album art by Michel Comte' was also used as the cover art of her autobiography. Merchandising items including a retail stand-up and posters were cross marketed at record stores and book stores concurrently. Diana also held a couple of rare book signings at Harrods in London and Barnes & Noble on Fifth Avenue in Manhattan. According to Billboard magazine, "Forever Diana: Musical Memoirs" has sold 73,000 US copies since its release. It peaked at #88 on the Top R&B Albums chart.

== Personnel ==
- Chris Bellman - Mastering at Bernie Grundman Mastering
- Gene Wooley, John Arrias - Digital restoration from the original 2 track masters

== Track listing ==
Disc 1: Reflections
The Supremes/Diana Ross & The Supremes
All tracks by Holland–Dozier–Holland unless otherwise noted

1. "When the Lovelight Starts Shining Through His Eyes" - 2:40
  - From 1964 album The Supremes: Where Did Our Love Go
2. "A Breathtaking Guy" (Robinson) - 2:27
  - From 1964 album The Supremes: Where Did Our Love Go
3. "Where Did Our Love Go" - 2:36
  - From 1964 album The Supremes: Where Did Our Love Go
4. "Baby Love" - 2:37
  - From 1964 album The Supremes: Where Did Our Love Go
5. "Come See About Me" - 2:43
  - From 1964 album The Supremes: Where Did Our Love Go
6. "Stop! In the Name of Love" - 2:53
  - From 1965 album The Supremes: More Hits by the Supremes
7. "Back in My Arms Again" - 2:57
  - From 1965 album The Supremes: More Hits by the Supremes
8. "You Send Me" (Cooke) - 2:11
  - From 1965 album The Supremes: We Remember Sam Cooke
9. "Nothing but Heartaches" - 2:45
  - From 1965 album The Supremes: More Hits by the Supremes
10. "Put on a Happy Face" (Adams, Strouse) - 2:09
  - From 1965 album The Supremes: The Supremes at the Copa
11. "I Hear a Symphony" - 2:44
  - From 1966 album The Supremes: I Hear a Symphony
12. "My World Is Empty Without You" - 2:36
  - From 1966 album The Supremes: I Hear a Symphony
13. "Love Is Like an Itching in My Heart" - 2:54
  - From 1966 album The Supremes: The Supremes A' Go-Go
14. "You Can't Hurry Love" - 2:54
  - From 1966 album The Supremes: The Supremes A' Go-Go
15. "You Keep Me Hangin' On" - 2:46
  - From 1966 album The Supremes: The Supremes Sing Holland-Dozier-Holland
16. "Love Is Here and Now You're Gone" - 2:49
  - From 1966 album The Supremes: The Supremes Sing Holland-Dozier-Holland
17. "The Happening" (DeVol, Dozier, Holland, Holland) - 2:51
  - From 1967 album Diana Ross & The Supremes: Greatest Hits
18. "Reflections" - 2:53
  - From 1968 album Diana Ross & The Supremes: Reflections
19. "In and Out of Love" - 2:40
  - From 1968 album Diana Ross & The Supremes: Reflections
20. "Forever Came Today" - 3:20
  - From 1968 album Diana Ross & The Supremes: Reflections
21. "Love Child" (Richards, Sawyer, Taylor, Wilson) - 2:58
  - From 1968 album Diana Ross & The Supremes: Love Child
22. "I'm Gonna Make You Love Me" (performed by Diana Ross & The Supremes and The Temptations) (Gamble, Huff, Ross) - 3:08
  - From 1968 album Diana Ross & The Supremes and The Temptations: Diana Ross & The Supremes Join the Temptations
23. "Try It Baby" (performed by Diana Ross & The Supremes and The Temptations) (Gordy) - 3:44
  - From 1968 album Diana Ross & The Supremes and The Temptations: Diana Ross & The Supremes Join the Temptations
24. "I'm Livin' in Shame" (Gamble, Huff, Ross) - 3:01
  - From 1969 album Diana Ross & The Supremes: Let the Sunshine In
25. Someday We'll Be Together (Beavers, Bristol, Fuqua) - 3:25
  - From 1969 album Diana Ross & The Supremes: Cream of the Crop

Disc 2: Reach Out and Touch

1. "Reach Out and Touch (Somebody's Hand)" (Ashford, Simpson) - 3:01
  - From 1970 album Diana Ross
2. "Ain't No Mountain High Enough" (7" Edit) (Ashford, Simpson) - 3:30
  - Full-length version appears on 1970 album Diana Ross
3. "Remember Me" (Ashford, Simpson) - 3:30
  - From 1971 album Surrender
4. "Reach Out (I'll Be There)" (Dozier, Holland, Holland) - 4:45
  - From 1971 album Surrender
5. "I Can't Give Back The Love I Feel For You" (listed as "Surrender") (Ashford, Simpson, Brian Holland) - 3:16
  - From 1971 album Surrender
6. "I'm Still Waiting" (Richards) - 3:44
  - From 1971 album Everything Is Everything
7. "Lady Sings the Blues" (Holiday, Nichols) - 1:21
  - From 1972 original motion picture soundtrack Lady Sings the Blues
8. "Good Morning Heartache" (Drake, Fisher, Higginbotham) - 2:22
  - From 1972 original motion picture soundtrack Lady Sings the Blues
9. "God Bless the Child" (Herzog, Holiday) - 2:44
  - From 1972 original motion picture soundtrack Lady Sings the Blues
10. "Touch Me in the Morning" (Masser, Miller) - 3:28
  - From 1973 album Touch Me in the Morning
11. "Brown Baby/Save the Children (Medley)" (Benson, Brown, Cleveland, Gaye) - 8:21
  - From 1973 album Touch Me in the Morning
12. "Last Time I Saw Him" (Masser, Sawyer) - 2:49
  - From 1973 album Last Time I Saw Him
13. "You Are Everything" (Duet with Marvin Gaye) (Bell, Creed) - 3:09
  - From 1973 album Diana Ross & Marvin Gaye: Diana & Marvin
14. "My Mistake (Was to Love You)" (Duet with Marvin Gaye) (Jones, Sawyer) - 2:55
  - From 1973 album Diana Ross & Marvin Gaye: Diana & Marvin
15. "Theme from Mahogany (Do You Know Where You're Going To)" (Goffin, Masser) - 3:26
  - From 1975 original motion picture soundtrack Mahogany and 1976 album Diana Ross
16. "Love Hangover" (7" Edit) (McLeod, Sawyer) - 3:45
  - Full-length version appears on 1976 album Diana Ross
17. "Confide in Me" (Manchester, Schwartz) - 3:36
  - From 1977 album Baby It's Me
18. "Come in from the Rain" (Manchester, Sager) - 4:01
  - From 1977 album Baby It's Me
19. "Gettin' Ready for Love" (Golde, Snow) - 2:48
  - From 1977 album Baby It's Me
20. "Home" (Ashford, Jones, Simpson, Smalls) - 4:05
  - From 1978 original motion picture soundtrack The Wiz

Disc 3: Chain Reaction

1. "The Boss" (Ashford, Simpson) - 3:58
  - From 1979 album The Boss
2. "It's My House" (Ashford, Simpson) - 4:32
  - From 1979 album The Boss
3. "I Ain't Been Licked" (Ashford, Simpson) - 4:07
  - From 1979 album The Boss
4. "Upside Down" (Edwards, Rodgers) - 4:07
  - From 1980 album diana
5. "I'm Coming Out" (Edwards, Rodgers) - 5:23
  - From 1980 album diana
6. "It's My Turn" (Masser, Sager) - 3:58
  - From 1980 original motion picture soundtrack It's My Turn and 1981 compilation To Love Again
7. "Endless Love" (Duet with Lionel Richie) (Richie) - 4:30
  - From 1981 original motion picture soundtrack Endless Love and US edition of 1981 compilation All the Great Hits
8. "My Old Piano" (Edwards, Rodgers) - 3:57
  - From 1980 album diana
9. "Why Do Fools Fall in Love" (Goldner, Lymon) - 2:55
  - From 1981 album Why Do Fools Fall in Love
10. "Mirror, Mirror" (Matkosky, Sembello) - 6:10
  - From 1981 album Why Do Fools Fall in Love
11. "Work That Body" (Chew, Jabara, Ross) - 5:00
  - From 1981 album Why Do Fools Fall in Love
12. "Muscles" (Jackson) - 4:41
  - From 1982 album Silk Electric
13. "Missing You" (Richie) - 4:17
  - From 1984 album Swept Away
14. "Swept Away" (Allen, Hall) - 5:25
  - From 1984 album Swept Away
15. "Eaten Alive" (Gibb, Gibb, Jackson) - 3:54
  - From 1985 album Eaten Alive
16. "Chain Reaction" (Gibb, B, Gibb, R, Gibb, M) - 3:47
  - From 1985 album Eaten Alive

Disc 4: The Best Years of My Life

1. "Family" (Live) (Eyen, Krieger) - 3:51
  - Recorded live at Central Park, New York, NY, 1983, previously unreleased
2. "Ninety-Nine and a Half" (Coates) - 2:05
  - Featured in the 1987 ABC Diana Ross special Red, Hot, Rhythm & Blues, previously unreleased
3. "What a Wonderful World" (Live) (Thiele, Weiss) - 2:07
  - Featured in 1988 HBO special Workin' Overtime World Tour 88, previously unreleased
4. "Amazing Grace" (Live) (Newton) - 5:43
  - From 1993 album Diana Ross, Plácido Domingo & José Carreras: Christmas in Vienna
5. "If We Hold on Together" (Horner, Mann, Jennings) - 4:11
  - From 1988 original motion picture soundtrack The Land Before Time and 1991 album The Force Behind the Power
6. "Workin' Overtime" (Max, Rodgers) - 4:18
  - From 1989 album Workin' Overtime
7. "This House" (Rodgers) - 5:38
  - From 1989 album Workin' Overtime
8. "The Force Behind the Power" (Wonder) - 4:45
  - From 1991 album The Force Behind the Power
9. "When You Tell Me That You Love Me" (Bettis, Hammond) - 4:13
  - From 1991 album The Force Behind the Power
10. "One Shining Moment" (Thomas) - 4:47
  - From 1991 album The Force Behind the Power
11. "Waiting in the Wings" (Remix) (Hill, Sinfield) - 4:11
  - Original version appears on 1991 album The Force Behind the Power
12. "Where Did We Go Wrong" (Ross, Wray, Wray) - 4:25
  - From international editions of 1993 album Stolen Moments: The Lady Sings... Jazz and Blues
13. "Back to the Future" (Bullard, Ross, Wray) - 4:25
  - 1993 recording
14. "Let's Make Every Moment Count" (Goffin, Snow) - 4:21
  - 1993 recording
15. "Your Love" (Friedman) - 4:04
  - 1993 recording
16. "It's a Wonderful Life" (Bullard, Ross, Wray) - 4:16
  - 1993 recording
17. "The Best Years of My Life" (Davis, Jennings) - 4:22
  - 1993 recording
