= All the Great Hits (Diana Ross album) =

All The Great Hits

Greatest hits album by Diana Ross
- Released: October 1981
- Recorded: 1970–1981
- Genre: R&B, soul
- Length: 72:43 (US); 58:40 (UK); 66:51 (CD)
- Label: Motown

Diana Ross chronology
To Love Again (1981)	All The Great Hits (1981)	Why Do Fools Fall in Love (1981)

Singles from All the Great Hits
- 1. "Endless Love" Released: August 1, 1981

Professional ratings
Review scores
Source	Rating
AllMusic	4/5 stars
Robert Christgau	B

All The Great Hits is a compilation album by American singer Diana Ross, released in October 1981 by Motown Records. It was the second Motown compilation set to capitalize on the success of 1980's diana produced by Chic. Her duet "Endless Love" with Lionel Richie was from the film of the same name, Endless Love and, just like 1980's "It's My Turn", had already been released as a single and on a soundtrack album.

The double-album detailing Ross' career at Motown was released in the weeks preceding her RCA debut Why Do Fools Fall in Love and became her third album that year to reach the top 40 in the U.S.

The album was certified Gold in the US and Platinum in the UK.

The European edition of the album (Motown STMA 8036) was a one-disc release with a different track list, replacing "Endless Love" and "The Supremes Medley" with "I'm Still Waiting", "All Of My Life" and "Surrender" as well as including edited versions of two of the four tracks from the diana album.

When re-released on compact disc by Motown/Universal Music in 2000 All The Great Hits had a third, alternate set of tracks.

== Track listing ==
=== US Edition ===
Side A

1. "Endless Love" (duet with Lionel Richie) (Richie) - 4:26
  - From 1981 original motion picture soundtrack Endless Love
2. "It's My Turn" (Masser, Sager) - 3:58
  - From 1980 original motion picture soundtrack It's My Turn
3. "Theme from Mahogany (Do You Know Where You're Going To)" (Goffin, Masser) - 3:21
  - From 1975 original motion picture soundtrack Mahogany and 1976 album Diana Ross
4. "Reach Out and Touch (Somebody's Hand)" (Nickolas Ashford, Valerie Simpson) - 2:59
  - From 1970 album Diana Ross
5. "Touch Me in the Morning" (Masser, Miller) - 3:52
  - From 1973 album Touch Me in the Morning

Side B

1. "Upside Down" (Edwards, Rodgers) - 4:03
  - From 1980 album diana
2. "I'm Coming Out" (Edwards, Rodgers) - 5:23
  - From diana
3. "Tenderness" (Edwards, Rodgers) - 3:49
  - From diana
4. "My Old Piano" (Edwards, Rodgers) - 3:57
  - From diana

Side C

1. "The Boss" (Nickolas Ashford, Valerie Simpson) - 3:53
  - From 1979 album The Boss
2. "It's My House" (Nickolas Ashford, Valerie Simpson) - 4:31
  - From 1979 album The Boss
3. "Love Hangover" (Marilyn McLeod, Pam Sawyer) - 3:47
  - From 1976 album Diana Ross
4. "Ain't No Mountain High Enough" (Nickolas Ashford, Valerie Simpson) - 3:37
  - From 1970 album Diana Ross

Side D

1. "Medley" (With The Supremes) (Holland–Dozier–Holland, R. Dean Taylor, Frank Wilson, Pam Sawyer, Deke Richards, Johnny Bristol, Jackey Beavers, Harvey Fuqua) - 15:11
  - a) "You Keep Me Hangin' On"
  - b) "My World Is Empty Without You"
  - c) "You Can't Hurry Love"
  - d) "Love Child"
  - e) "Reflections"
  - f) "I Hear a Symphony"
  - g) "Love Is Here and Now You're Gone"
  - h) "Someday We'll Be Together"
2. "Remember Me" (Nickolas Ashford, Valerie Simpson) - 3:16
  - From 1971 album Surrender

=== European Edition ===
Side A

1. "It's My Turn" (Masser, Sager) - 3:57
2. "Theme from Mahogany (Do You Know Where You're Going To)" (Goffin, Masser) - 3:21
3. "Reach Out and Touch (Somebody's Hand)" (Nickolas Ashford, Valerie Simpson) - 2:59
4. "Touch Me in the Morning" (Masser, Miller) - 3:52
5. "I'm Still Waiting" (Richards) - 3:33
  - From 1970 album Everything Is Everything
6. "All Of My Life" (Michael Randall) - 3:22
  - From 1973 album Touch Me in the Morning
7. "Surrender" (Nickolas Ashford, Valerie Simpson) - 2:49
8. "Remember Me" (Nickolas Ashford, Valerie Simpson) - 3:16
  - From Surrender

Side B

1. "Upside Down" (Edwards, Rodgers) - 4:03
2. "I'm Coming Out" (Edwards, Rodgers) - 3:54
3. "Tenderness" (Edwards, Rodgers) - 3:49
4. "My Old Piano" (Edwards, Rodgers) - 3:57
5. "The Boss" (Nickolas Ashford, Valerie Simpson) - 3:53
6. "It's My House" (Nickolas Ashford, Valerie Simpson) - 4:31
7. "Love Hangover" (Marilyn McLeod, Pam Sawyer) - 3:47
8. "Ain't No Mountain High Enough" (Nickolas Ashford, Valerie Simpson) - 3:37

=== 2000 CD ===
1. "Endless Love" (duet with Lionel Richie) (Richie) - 4:28
2. "It's My Turn" (Masser, Sager) - 3:58
3. "Theme from Mahogany (Do You Know Where You're Going To)" (Goffin, Masser) - 3:24
4. "Reach Out and Touch (Somebody's Hand)" (Nickolas Ashford, Valerie Simpson) - 3:01
5. "Touch Me in the Morning" (Masser, Miller) - 3:52
6. "Good Morning Heartache" (Irene Higginbotham, Ervin Drake, Dan Fisher) - 2:22
7. "Last Time I Saw Him" (Michael Masser, Pam Sawyer) - 2:50
8. "Upside Down" (Edwards, Rodgers) - 4:03
9. "I'm Coming Out" (Edwards, Rodgers) - 5:23
10. "Tenderness" (Edwards, Rodgers) - 3:51
11. "My Old Piano" (Edwards, Rodgers) - 3:55
12. "The Boss" (Nickolas Ashford, Valerie Simpson) - 3:53
13. "It's My House" (Nickolas Ashford, Valerie Simpson) - 4:31
14. "Love Hangover" (Marilyn McLeod, Pam Sawyer) - 7:54
15. "Ain't No Mountain High Enough" (Nickolas Ashford, Valerie Simpson) - 6:20
16. "Remember Me" (Nickolas Ashford, Valerie Simpson) - 3:16

== Charts ==
Chart (1981)	Peak position
Dutch Albums (Album Top 100)	24
UK Albums (OCC)	21
US Billboard 200	37
US Cashbox Top Pop Albums	33
Chart (2022)	Peak position
UK Album Downloads (OCC)	14

== Certifications ==
Region	Certification	Certified units/sales
Canada (Music Canada)	Gold	50,000^{^}
United Kingdom (BPI)	Platinum	300,000^{^}
United States (RIAA)	Gold	500,000^{^}
^{^} Shipments figures based on certification alone.
