= One Woman: The Ultimate Collection =

Greatest hits album by Diana Ross
- Released: October 18, 1993
- Recorded: 1964–1993
- Genres: Soul; pop
- Label: EMI

Diana Ross chronology
| Forever Diana: Musical Memoirs (1993) | One Woman: The Ultimate Collection (1993) | Diana Extended: The Remixes (1994) |

Singles from One Woman: The Ultimate Collection
- 1. "The Best Years of My Life" Released: October 18, 1993 (US) March 15, 1994 (UK); 2. "Your Love" Released: November 29, 1993

Professional ratings
Review scores
| Source | Rating |
|---|---|
| AllMusic | 5/5 stars |

One Woman: The Ultimate Collection is a compilation album by American singer Diana Ross, released on October 18, 1993 by EMI Records. The single-disc collection was the alternative to Ross' 1993 four-CD box set, Forever Diana: Musical Memoirs, which was a 30th anniversary commemorative of her hit-making years over three decades including work with The Supremes. This collection was similar featuring both Supremes hits and solo hits.

It became Ross' best-selling album in the United Kingdom, selling over 1,200,000 copies (4× platinum). It peaked at number one on the UK Albums Chart for two non-consecutive weeks, first over the Christmas week of 1993 and again in January 1994. The success of this release in the United Kingdom meant that Ross would embark on her most extensive tour of the UK in her 28 years of touring in that market since her maiden tour with The Supremes on "The Motortown Revue" in 1965.

The album, conceived by advertising agency Mitchell Patterson Aldred Mitchell, was first introduced to UK, European and international markets with a four-week sequential advertising campaign before its release, on prime time television. The first week began with a shot of Ross' legs laying down and accompanying music that included the newly-released single "Chain Reaction '93"; the second week her mid-torso was shown along with teaser quotes inviting the viewer to guess who it was, though the music gave huge cues of her next single "The Best Years of My Life". The third week, her upper torso was now visible, and the final week, days before the album's commercial release, Ross was revealed in full, lying down, in a photo shoot by Albert Watson, including a megamix of Ross' biggest hits.

According to Soundscan, One Woman: The Ultimate Collection sold over 275,000 in the United States despite never making the charts there. It also went Platinum in Belgium and Gold in France.

== Track listing ==
=== International edition ===
| No. | Title | Writer(s) | Original album | Length |
|---|---|---|---|---|
| 1. | "Where Did Our Love Go" (The Supremes) | Holland–Dozier–Holland | Where Did Our Love Go (1964) | 2:36 |
| 2. | "Baby Love" (The Supremes) | Holland–Dozier–Holland | Where Did Our Love Go (1964) | 2:37 |
| 3. | "You Can't Hurry Love" (The Supremes) | Holland–Dozier–Holland | The Supremes A' Go-Go (1966) | 2:54 |
| 4. | "Reflections" (Diana Ross & The Supremes) | Holland–Dozier–Holland | Reflections (1968) | 2:53 |
| 5. | "Reach Out and Touch (Somebody's Hand)" | Nickolas Ashford; Valerie Simpson | Diana Ross (1970) | 3:01 |
| 6. | "Ain't No Mountain High Enough" (7" edit) | Ashford; Simpson | Diana Ross (1970) | 3:30 |
| 7. | "Touch Me in the Morning" | Michael Masser; Ron Miller | Touch Me in the Morning (1973) | 3:28 |
| 8. | "Love Hangover" (7" edit) | Marilyn McLeod; Pam Sawyer | Diana Ross (1976) | 3:45 |
| 9. | "I'm Still Waiting" | Deke Richards | Everything Is Everything (1971) | 3:44 |
| 10. | "Upside Down" | Nile Rodgers; Bernard Edwards | diana (1980) | 4:07 |
| 11. | "Theme from Mahogany (Do You Know Where You're Going To)" | Masser; Gerry Goffin | Mahogany soundtrack (1975) & Diana Ross (1976) | 3:26 |
| 12. | "Endless Love" (with Lionel Richie) | Richie | Endless Love soundtrack (1981) | 4:30 |
| 13. | "Why Do Fools Fall in Love" | Frankie Lymon; George Goldner | Why Do Fools Fall in Love (1981) | 2:55 |
| 14. | "Chain Reaction" | Barry Gibb; Robin Gibb; Maurice Gibb | Eaten Alive (1985) | 3:47 |
| 15. | "When You Tell Me That You Love Me" | John Bettis; Albert Hammond | The Force Behind the Power (1991) | 4:13 |
| 16. | "One Shining Moment" | Vaneese Thomas | The Force Behind the Power (1991) | 4:47 |
| 17. | "If We Hold on Together" | James Horner; Will Jennings | The Land Before Time soundtrack (1988) & The Force Behind the Power (1991) | 4:11 |
| 18. | "The Best Years of My Life" | Jennings; Allen Davis | previously unreleased | 4:22 |
| 19. | "Your Love" | David Friedman | previously unreleased | 4:04 |
| 20. | "Let's Make Every Moment Count" | Goffin; Tom Snow | previously unreleased | 4:21 |

=== North American edition ===
| No. | Title | Writer(s) | Original album | Length |
|---|---|---|---|---|
| 1. | "Where Did Our Love Go" (The Supremes) | Holland–Dozier–Holland | Where Did Our Love Go (1964) | 2:36 |
| 2. | "Baby Love" (The Supremes) | Holland–Dozier–Holland | Where Did Our Love Go (1964) | 2:37 |
| 3. | "Stop! In the Name of Love" (The Supremes) | Holland–Dozier–Holland | More Hits by The Supremes (1965) | 2:53 |
| 4. | "You Can't Hurry Love" (The Supremes) | Holland–Dozier–Holland | The Supremes A' Go-Go (1966) | 2:54 |
| 5. | "Reflections" (Diana Ross & The Supremes) | Holland–Dozier–Holland | Reflections (1968) | 2:53 |
| 6. | "Reach Out and Touch (Somebody's Hand)" | Nickolas Ashford; Valerie Simpson | Diana Ross (1970) | 3:01 |
| 7. | "Ain't No Mountain High Enough" (7" edit) | Ashford; Simpson | Diana Ross (1970) | 3:30 |
| 8. | "Touch Me in the Morning" | Michael Masser; Ron Miller | Touch Me in the Morning (1973) | 3:28 |
| 9. | "Theme from Mahogany (Do You Know Where You're Going To)" | Masser; Gerry Goffin | Mahogany soundtrack (1975) & Diana Ross (1976) | 3:26 |
| 10. | "Love Hangover" (7" edit) | Marilyn McLeod; Pam Sawyer | Diana Ross (1976) | 3:45 |
| 11. | "Upside Down" | Nile Rodgers; Bernard Edwards | diana (1980) | 4:07 |
| 12. | "Endless Love" (with Lionel Richie) | Richie | Endless Love soundtrack (1981) | 4:30 |
| 13. | "Why Do Fools Fall in Love" | Frankie Lymon; George Goldner | Why Do Fools Fall in Love (1981) | 2:55 |
| 14. | "Missing You" | Richie | Swept Away (1984) | 4:19 |
| 15. | "Chain Reaction" | Barry Gibb; Robin Gibb; Maurice Gibb | Eaten Alive (1985) | 3:47 |
| 16. | "When You Tell Me That You Love Me" | John Bettis; Albert Hammond | The Force Behind the Power (1991) | 4:13 |
| 17. | "One Shining Moment" | Vaneese Thomas | The Force Behind the Power (1991) | 4:47 |
| 18. | "If We Hold on Together" | James Horner; Will Jennings | The Land Before Time soundtrack (1988) & The Force Behind the Power (1991) | 4:11 |
| 19. | "The Best Years of My Life" | Jennings; Allen Davis | previously unreleased | 4:22 |
| 20. | "Someday We'll Be Together" (single remix) | Jackey Beavers; Johnny Bristol; Harvey Fuqua | Cream of the Crop (1969) | 4:03 |

== Charts ==
=== Weekly charts ===
| Chart (1993–1994) | Peak position |
|---|---|
| Australian Albums (ARIA) | 119 |
| European Top 100 Albums (Music & Media) | 10 |
| French Albums (SNEP) | 5 |
| Irish Albums (IRMA) | 3 |
| UK Albums (Official Charts) | 1 |

=== Year-end charts ===
1993 year-end chart performance for One Woman: The Ultimate Collection
| Chart (1993) | Rank |
|---|---|
| UK Albums (OCC) | 5 |

== Certifications ==
| Region | Certification | Certified units/sales |
|---|---|---|
| Belgium (BRMA) | Platinum | 50,000^{*} |
| France (SNEP) | Gold | 100,000^{*} |
| United Kingdom (BPI) | 4× Platinum | 1,200,000^{^} |
^{*} Sales figures based on certification alone.^{^} Shipments figures based on certification alone.
