= Upside Down: The Collection =

Compilation album by Diana Ross
- Released: November 6, 2012
- Length: 77:35
- Label: Spectrum/Universal

Upside Down: The Collection is a compilation album by Diana Ross, released by Spectrum Music/Universal in the United Kingdom in 2012. This album is a budget collection containing songs that were released from 1970 through 1981 on Motown Records. In the UK, 17 of the 20 songs contained in this compilation reached the Top 40. In the U.S., 12 of these songs made it onto the Billboard Top 40 singles charts, and 6 of those 12 reached number 1.

== Reception ==
Professional ratings
Review scores
Source	Rating
Allmusic	3/5 stars

Writing for Allmusic, critic Andy Kellman wrote, "Released in the U.K. by the Universal-affiliated Spectrum, Upside Down: The Collection is a somewhat arbitrary set of selections from Diana Ross' solo catalog. It hops from era to era — the first four songs span several years, for instance — and it doesn't have all the essential material (or even all the Top Ten R&B singles)."

== Track listing ==
1. "Love Hangover" (Marilyn McLeod, Pamela Sawyer) – 3:49
2. "I'm Coming Out" (Nile Rodgers, Bernard Edwards) – 3:56
3. "Touch Me In The Morning" (Michael Masser, Ron Miller) – 3:49
4. "Endless Love" (with Lionel Richie) (Lionel Richie) – 4:26
5. "The Boss" (Valerie Simpson, Nickolas Ashford) – 3:50
6. "My Old Piano" (Bernard Edwards, Nile Rodgers) – 3:55
7. "I'm Still Waiting" (Deke Richards) – 3:44
8. "Reach Out and Touch (Somebody's Hand)" (Nickolas Ashford, Valerie Simpson) – 3:03
9. "Remember Me" (Nickolas Ashford, Valerie Simpson) – 3:32
10. "Upside Down" (Nile Rodgers, Bernard Edwards) – 3:38
11. "Surrender" (Nickolas Ashford, Valerie Simpson) – 2:53
12. "DoobeDood'nDoobe, DoobeDood'nDoobe, DoobeDood'nDoo" (Deke Richards) – 4:52
13. "It's My Turn" (Michael Masser, Carole Bayer Sager) – 3:55
14. "Sorry Doesn't Always Make It Right" (Pamela Sawyer, Michael Masser) – 3:31
15. "Ain't No Mountain High Enough" (Valerie Simpson, Nickolas Ashford) – 3:36
16. "Your Love Is So Good For Me" (Kenneth Edward Peterson) – 6:34
17. "Top Of The World" (Tom Snow) – 3:08
18. "I Thought It Took A Little Time (But Today I Fell In Love)" (Pamela Sawyer, Michael Masser) – 3:20
19. "Theme From Mahogany (Do You Know Where You're Going To)" (Michael Masser, Gerry Goffin) – 3:23
20. "No One Gets The Prize" (Nickolas Ashford, Valerie Simpson) – 4:41

== Production notes ==
- "Reach Out And Touch (Somebody's Hand)" and *"Ain't No Mountain High Enough"

Produced by Nickolas Ashford and Valerie Simpson
(US) From the Motown album "Diana Ross" MS-711 (1970)
(UK) From the Tamla Motown album "Diana Ross" STML 11159 (1970)

- "I'm Still Waiting" and "DoobeDood'nDoobe, DoobeDood'nDoobe, DoobeDood'nDoo"

Produced by Deke Richards and Hal Davis
(US) From the Motown album "Everything Is Everything" MS724 (1970)
(UK) From the Tamla Motown album "Everything Is Everything" STML 11178 (1971)

- "Remember Me" and "Surrender"

Produced by Nickolas Ashford and Valerie Simpson
(US) From the Motown album "Surrender" MS 723 (1971)
(UK) From the Tamla Motown album "I'm Still Waiting" STML 11193 (1971)

- "Touch Me In The Morning"

Produced by Michael Masser and Tom Baird
(US) From the Motown album "Touch Me in the Morning" M 772 L (1973)
(UK) From the Tamla Motown album "Touch Me in the Morning" STML 11239 (1973)

- "Love Hangover", "I Thought It Took A Little Time (But Today I Fell In Love)" and "Theme From Mahogany (Do You Know Where You're Going To)"

Produced by Hal Davis
(US) From the Motown album "Diana Ross" M6-861S1 (1976)
(UK) From the Motown album "Diana Ross" STML 12022 (1976)

- "Your Love Is So Good For Me" and "Top Of The World"

Produced by Richard Perry
(US) From the Motown album "Baby It's Me" M7-890R1 (1977)
(UK) From the Motown album "Baby It's Me STMA 8031 (1977)

- "Sorry Doesn't Always Make It Right"

Produced by Michael Masser
(US) From the Motown album "Ross" M7-907R1 (1978)
(UK) From the Motown album "Ross" STML 12093 (1978)

- "The Boss" and "No One Gets The Prize"

Produced by Nickolas Ashford and Valerie Simpson
(US) From the Motown album "The Boss" M7-923R1 (1979)
(UK) From the Tamla Motown album "The Boss" STML 12118 (1979)

- "Upside Down", "I'm Coming Out" and "My Old Piano"

Produced by Bernard Edwards and Nile Rodgers
(US) From the Motown album "diana" M8-936M1 (1980)
(UK) From the Motown album "diana" STMA 8033 (1980)

- "It's My Turn"

Produced by Michael Masser
(US) From the Motown album "To Love Again" M8-951M1 (1980)
(UK) From the Motown album "To Love Again" STML 12152 (1980)

- "Endless Love"

Produced by Lionel Richie
From the Mercury album "Endless Love" Official Soundtrack SRM-1-2001 (1981)

=== 2012 Compilation ===
- Project coordinated by Joe Howard
- Mastering by Kieron McGarry at Universal Music
