= The Greatest (Diana Ross album) =

Compilation album by Diana Ross
- Released: November 7, 2011
- Recorded: 1964–2005
- Genre: Pop soul; funk; R&B

Professional ratings
Review scores
Source	Rating
AllMusic	4/5 stars

The Greatest is a 2011 compilation album by American singer Diana Ross and includes both her solo and Supremes material as well as duets with Lionel Richie, Rod Stewart, Michael Jackson, Ray Charles and Marvin Gaye. The album reached number 24 in the UK and was eventually awarded a BPI Platinum disc for sales of over 300,000 copies.

== Track listing ==
=== Disc 1 ===
1. "I'm Coming Out"
2. "Muscles"
3. "Ain't No Mountain High Enough"
4. "Why Do Fools Fall in Love"
5. "If We Hold on Together"
6. "Love Child" – Diana Ross & The Supremes
7. "Remember Me"
8. "When You Tell Me That You Love Me"
9. "Chain Reaction"
10. "Touch Me in the Morning"
11. "It's My House"
12. "The Boss"
13. "Last Time I Saw Him"
14. "My Old Piano"
15. "Love Hangover"
16. "Work That Body"
17. "Endless Love" – Lionel Richie, Diana Ross
18. "Baby Love" – The Supremes
19. "Ease On down the Road" #1 – Diana Ross, Michael Jackson, Quincy Jones
20. "Stop, Look, Listen (To Your Heart)" – Diana Ross, Marvin Gaye
21. "Come See About Me" – The Supremes
22. "Reach Out and Touch (Somebody's Hand)"

=== Disc 2 ===
1. "Upside Down"
2. "Stop! In the Name of Love" – The Supremes
3. "I'm Still Waiting"
4. "Surrender"
5. "One Shining Moment"
6. "Theme from Mahogany (Do You Know Where You're Going To)"
7. "Reflections" – Diana Ross & The Supremes
8. "No One Gets the Prize"
9. "You Are Everything" – Diana Ross, Marvin Gaye
10. "The Happening" – The Supremes
11. "I'm Gonna Make You Love Me" – Diana Ross & The Supremes, The Temptations
12. "You Can't Hurry Love" – The Supremes
13. "It's My Turn"
14. "Big Bad Love" – Diana Ross, Ray Charles
15. "DoobeDood'nDoobe, DoobeDood'nDoobe, DoobeDood'nDoo"
16. "Where Did Our Love Go" – The Supremes
17. "Not Over You Yet"
18. "Take Me Higher"
19. "You Keep Me Hangin' On" – The Supremes
20. "I've Got a Crush on You" – Diana Ross, Rod Stewart
21. "Lovin', Livin' and Givin'"
22. "What a Wonderful World" [Live from Wembley Arena, 1989]

== Charts ==
Chart (2011)	Peak position
Belgian Albums (Ultratop Flanders)	97
Scottish Albums (OCC)	34
UK Albums (OCC)	24
Chart (2022)	Peak position
Scottish Albums (OCC)	45
UK Albums (OCC)	49

== Certifications ==
Region	Certification	Certified units/sales
United Kingdom (BPI)	Platinum	300,000^{‡}
^{‡} Sales+streaming figures based on certification alone.
