= The Definitive Collection (Diana Ross album) =

Compilation album by Diana Ross
- Released: 29 August 2006
- Recorded: 1970–1984
- Genre: Funk, R&B, pop, soul
- Length: 76:57
- Label: Hip-O

Professional ratings
Review scores
Source	Rating
Allmusic	4/5 stars

The Definitive Collection is a 2006 compilation album by Motown sensation Diana Ross.

== Track listing ==
1. "I'm Coming Out" - 5:10
2. "Love Hangover" - 3:47
3. "Missing You" - 4:15
4. "Mirror, Mirror" - 6:06
5. "Touch Me in the Morning" - 3:49
6. "Upside Down" - 4:03
7. "Muscles" - 4:37
8. "Why Do Fools Fall in Love" - 2:53
9. "Reach Out and Touch (Somebody's Hand)" - 3:03
10. "Good Morning Heartache" - 2:20
11. "Last Time I Saw Him" - 2:49
12. "My Mistake (Was to Love You)" (with Marvin Gaye) - 2:54
13. "It's My Turn" - 3:55
14. "Ain't No Mountain High Enough" - 4:07
15. "The Boss" - 3:51
16. "Swept Away" - 5:23
17. "Theme from Mahogany (Do You Know Where You're Going To)" - 3:23
18. "Endless Love" (with Lionel Richie) - 4:26
19. "What a Diff'rence a Day Made" - 3:27
20. "Remember Me" - 3:39
