= Voice of Love =

Compilation album by Diana Ross
- Released: November 11, 1996
- Length: 75:30
- Label: EMI

Diana Ross chronology
Take Me Higher (1995)	Voice of Love (1996)	Every Day is a New Day (1999)

Singles from Voice of Love
- 1. "In the Ones You Love" Released: 1996; 2. "Promise Me You'll Try" Released: February 8, 1997

Voice of Love is a compilation album by American singer Diana Ross. It was released by EMI International on November 11, 1996. The album consists of some of Ross' best known love songs and also included three previously unreleased songs: "In the Ones You Love", "I Hear (The Voice of Love)," co-written by Ross, and a take on Michael Jackson's "You Are Not Alone," penned by R. Kelly. Photographer Randee St. Nicholas was commissioned to create the album cover art, tour merchandising and the high fashion music video for lead single "In the Ones You Love".

The album peaked at number 42 on the UK Albums Chart and was eventually certified gold by the British Phonographic Industry (BPI) in 2019. In support of Voice of Love, Ross embarked on a 28 market European tour in 1997, selling out venues across Great Britain and makings rare appearances in Central and Eastern Europe markets like Bucharest, Brussels and Vienna. In Asian markets, the album title was Gift of Love. The set included three songs not found on any other Diana Ross CD, including a hit in Pan Asian territories, "Promise Me You'll Try".

== Track listing ==
No.	Title	Writer(s)	Original album	Length
1.	"Touch Me in the Morning"	Ron Miller; Michael Masser	Touch Me in the Morning	3:26
2.	"You're All I Need to Get By"	Nickolas Ashford; Valerie Simpson	Diana Ross	3:25
3.	"Your Love"	David Friedman	Forever Diana: Musical Memoirs	4:04
4.	"So Close"	Bill Wray; Rob Mounsey; Diana Ross	Silk Electric	4:13
5.	"It's My Turn"	Masser; Carole Bayer Sager	It's My Turn	3:58
6.	"You Are Everything" (duet with Marvin Gaye)	Thom Bell; Linda Creed	Diana & Marvin	3:09
7.	"When You Tell Me That You Love Me"	Albert Hammond; John Bettis	The Force Behind the Power	4:13
8.	"Forever Young"	Bob Dylan	Swept Away	4:50
9.	"I Am Me"	Freddie Gorman; Janie Bradford; Ross	Silk Electric	3:50
10.	"One Shining Moment"	Vaneese Thomas	The Force Behind the Power	4:45
11.	"If We Hold on Together"	James Horner; Will Jennings	The Land Before Time	3:43
12.	"Only Love Can Conquer All"	Sally Jo Dakota; Preston Glass; Narada Michael Walden	Take Me Higher	4:10
13.	"I'm Still Waiting"	Deke Richards	Everything Is Everything	3:43
14.	"Missing You"	Lionel Richie	Swept Away	4:16
15.	"Gone"	Jon-John Robinson	Take Me Higher	5:16
16.	"In the Ones You Love"	Liz Vidal; Marsha Malamet	previously unreleased	4:18
17.	"You Are Not Alone"	R. Kelly	previously unreleased	4:16
18.	"I Hear (The Voice of Love)"	Ross; Stan Scates	previously unreleased	4:32

A Gift of Love
No.	Title	Writer(s)	Original album	Length
1.	"Promise Me You'll Try"	Peter Zizzo	previously unreleased	3:56
2.	"Your Love"	David Friedman	Forever Diana: Musical Memoirs	4:04
3.	"If We Hold on Together"	Horner; Jennings	The Land Before Time	3:43
4.	"When You Tell Me That You Love Me"	Hammond; Bettis	The Force Behind the Power	4:13
5.	"That's Why I Call You My Friend"	Ross; Bettis; Toshifumi Hinata	That's Why I Call You My Friend	3:43
6.	"When You Dream"	Wray; Ross; Peter Asher; Hinata	When You Dream	3:21
7.	"I Hear (The Voice of Love)"	Ross; Stan Scates	previously unreleased	4:32
8.	"So Close"	Wray; Mounsey; Ross	Silk Electric	4:13

== Charts ==
Chart (1996)	Peak position
UK Albums (OCC)	42

== Certifications ==
Region	Certification	Certified units/sales
United Kingdom (BPI)	Gold	100,000^{‡}
^{‡} Sales+streaming figures based on certification alone.
