= The Voice of Love =

The Voice of Love (or variations) may refer to:

- The Voice of Love (film), a 1934 German film directed by Victor Janson
- The Voice of Love (album), a 1993 album by Julee Cruise
- The Voice of Love, a 2007 album by Arthur Brown
- Voice of Love, 1996 compilation album by American soul singer Diana Ross
- The Voice of Love, a 1959 song by Johnny Nash
