= Take Me Higher =

Studio album by Diana Ross
- Released: September 5, 1995
- Genres: R&B; dance
- Length: 50:50
- Label: Motown
- Producers: Louis Biancaniello; The Boom Brothers; Jon-John; Mike Mani; Nick Martinelli; Monty Seward; Narada Michael Walden

Diana Ross chronology
A Very Special Season (1994)	Take Me Higher (1995)	Voice of Love (1996)

Singles from Take Me Higher
- 1. "Take Me Higher" Released: August 5, 1995; 2. "Gone"/"Swing It" Released: November 14, 1995; 3. "Voice of the Heart"/"If You're Not Gonna Love Me Right" Released: February 20, 1996; 4. "I Will Survive" Released: April 14, 1996

Take Me Higher is the twenty-first studio album by American singer Diana Ross, released on September 5, 1995, by Motown Records. Ross' first regular studio release in four years, following The Force Behind the Power (1991), the album features work from urban producers such Narada Michael Walden, Mike Mani, Louis Biancaniello, Jon-John and the Babyface protégés, The Boom Brothers.

The album peaked at number 10 on the UK Albums Chart and entered the top forty in Austria and Scotland as well as on the US Top R&B/Hip-Hop Albums. Take Me Higher yielded several singles, including the UK hits "Take Me Higher", "Gone" and Ross' dance cover of Gloria Gaynor's disco anthem "I Will Survive" (1978). Photographer Ruvén Afanador shot the album cover and the fashion-forward video shoot, which Ross used for promotional purposes. He also shot the video compilation for the single, "Don't Stop".

== Singles ==
Title track and lead single "Take Me Higher" became a hit on the dance charts, reaching number four on the UK Dance Singles, while topping the US Dance Club Songs. Follow-up "Gone" became Ross' 54th top 40 entry in the UK, while "If You're Not Gonna Love Me Right" reached number 67 on the US Hot R&B/Hip-Hop Songs. "Voice of the Heart" peaked at number 28 on the US Adult Contemporary. "I Will Survive," Ross' cover of the Gloria Gaynor song, reached number 14 in the UK Singles Chart. Her version got an extra boost from being played at a key scene in Frank Oz's American comedy film, In & Out (1997). Ross also performed it during a "Take Me Higher" megamix at her acclaimed Super Bowl XXX Half-Time show as she was whisked away in a helicopter.

== Critical reception ==
Professional ratings
Review scores
Source	Rating
AllMusic	2/5 stars
Music Week	2/5 stars
NME	3/10
The Rolling Stone Album Guide	2.5/5 stars

Reviews of Take Me Higher were mixed. Gil L. Robertson IV from Cash Box portrayed Take Me Higher as a strong, polished comeback built with "the hottest producers" and "first rate" song selection and production. He praised Ross's vocals as "strong and full of bravado," and predicted major success across pop, urban, and adult contemporary formats, highlighting several standout tracks." By contrast, NME critic Keith Cameron argued that the album's contemporary production "nullif[ies]" Ross's distinctive voice and leaves the album lacking substance. He contended that her attempt to sound modern results in her being "drown[ed] in [...] digital vats," and concludes that the record is an uneven effort, with Ross most effective only when she "sounds like herself."

Similarly, Vibe's Elysa Gardner considered the album "mired in excess," citing an overabundance of collaborators, synthetic production, and "heavy-handed sentiment," and suggesting that its primary focus was commercial appeal. In a retrospective review for AllMusic, editor William Ruhlmann wrote that "combining the work of four separate producers who mostly tried to fit Ross into contemporary dance trends, the album did feature a club hit in the title song, while the ballad "Gone" made the Top 40 in the UK. But Ross herself seemed to have spent more time posing for the many fashion shots in the booklet than singing the pedestrian songs."

== Chart performance ==
In the United Kingdom, Take Me Higher debuted and peaked at number 10 on the UK Albums Chart, becoming Ross' first top ten studio album since Diana Ross (1976). Elsewhere, it entered the top forty in Austria and Scotland, reaching number 40 and number 37, respectively. In the United States, Take Me Higher underperformed, peaking at 114 on the US Billboard 200 and number 38 on the US Top R&B/Hip-Hop Albums, while selling a little over 100,000 copies.

== Track listing ==
US edition
No.	Title	Writer(s)	Producer(s)	Length
1.	"Take Me Higher"	Sally Jo Dakota; Nikita Germaine; Narada Michael Walden	Walden; Mike Mani^{[a]}	4:18
2.	"If You're Not Gonna Love Me Right"	Monty Seward	The Boom Bros.; Seward^{[b]}	4:41
3.	"Voice of the Heart"	John Bettis; Bruce Roberts; Julia Turner-Stanley	Nick Martinelli	4:18
4.	"Let Somebody Know"	Bunny Hull; Brenda Russell		4:55
5.	"Keep It Right There"	Babyface; Jon-John Robinson; Chris Liscomb	Jon-John	4:50
6.	"Don't Stop"	Anthony Bryant; Chuck Boom	The Boom Bros.	3:48
7.	"Gone"	Robinson	Jon-John	5:15
8.	"Only Love Can Conquer All"	Dakota; Preston Glass; Walden	Walden; Louis Biancaniello^{[a]}	4:10
9.	"I Never Loved a Man Before"	Gerry Goffin; Tom Snow	Martinelli	4:55
10.	"I Thought That We Were Still in Love"	Tom Snow; Liz Vidal	Martinelli	4:52
11.	"I Will Survive"	Dino Fekaris; Freddie Perren	Walden; Biancaniello^{[a]}	4:48

International edition
No.	Title	Writer(s)	Producer(s)	Length
1.	"Take Me Higher"	Dakota; Germaine; Walden	Walden; Mani^{[a]}	4:18
2.	"If You're Not Gonna Love Me Right"	Seward	The Boom Bros.; Seward^{[b]}	4:41
3.	"I Never Loved a Man Before"	Goffin; Snow	Martinelli	4:55
4.	"Swing It"	Babyface; Robinson; Liscomb	Jon-John	4:14
5.	"Keep It Right There"	Babyface; Robinson; Liscomb	Jon-John	4:50
6.	"Don't Stop"	Bryant; Boom	The Boom Bros.	3:48
7.	"Gone"	Robinson	Jon-John	5:15
8.	"I Thought That We Were Still in Love"	Snow; Vidal	Martinelli	4:52
9.	"Voice of the Heart"	Bettis; Roberts; Turner-Stanley	Martinelli	4:218
10.	"Only Love Can Conquer All"	Dakota; Glass; Walden	Walden; Biancaniello^{[a]}	4:10
11.	"I Will Survive"	Fekaris; Perren	Walden; Biancaniello^{[a]}	4:48

Japan bonus track
No.	Title	Writer(s)	Producer(s)	Length
12.	"If We Hold On Together"	James Horner; Will Jennings	Peter Asher	4:09

Notes

- ^{^[a]} signifies an associate producer
- ^{^[b]} signifies an co-producer

== Personnel ==
- Diana Ross – vocals, backing vocals (7)
- Mike Mani – keyboards (1), programming (1)
- Monty Seward – keyboards (2), programming (2)
- Mark Portmann – programming (3), arrangements (3, 10), acoustic piano (9, 10), synthesizers (9, 10), drums (9)
- Bunny Hull – keyboard programming and performance (4), backing vocals (4), arrangements (4), BGV arrangements (4)
- Stephan Oberhoff – string synthesizer (4)
- Jon-John Robinson – all instruments (5), acoustic piano (7), all instruments on "Swing It"
- The Boom Brothers – all instruments (6)
- Scott Alspach – keyboards (9), drum programming (9), percussion (9), rhythm arrangements (9)
- Ted Pearlman – guitars (3)
- Ricardo Silvera – acoustic guitar (4), guitars (7)
- A. Ray Fuller – guitars (9)
- Ramon Stagnaro – acoustic guitar (9), acoustic guitar solo (9)
- Colin Sauers – bass (7)
- Freddie Washington – electric bass (9)
- Chuck Domanico – bass (10)
- Michael White – drums (4)
- Ron Bruner – drums (7), percussion (7)
- Harvey Mason – drums (10)
- Luis Conte – percussion (4)
- Rafael Padilla – percussion (9)
- Frank Martin – live string arrangements and conductor (2), keyboards (8), rhythm programming (8), synth string arrangements and conductor (8)
- Brenda Russell – arrangements (4), BGV arrangements (4)
- Louis Biancaniello – string arrangements (8), keyboards (11), programming (11)
- Patti Austin – backing vocals (1, 8)
- Angela Bofill – backing vocals (1, 8)
- Nikita Germaine – backing vocals (1, 8, 11)
- Sandy Griffith – backing vocals (1, 8, 11)
- Tony Lindsay – backing vocals (1, 8)
- Kimaya Seward – backing vocals (2)
- Alexandra Brown – backing vocals (3, 9)
- Jackie Gouche Farris – backing vocals (3, 9)
- Tony Warren – backing vocals (3, 9)
- Valerie Pinkston-Mayo – backing vocals (4)
- Shireen Crutchfield – backing vocals (5)
- Heather Mason – backing vocals (5, 7), backing vocals on "Swing It"
- Anthony Bailey – backing vocals (6)
- Chuck Boom – backing vocals (6)
- Natasha Pierce – backing vocals (6), backing vocals on "Swing It"
- Dee Dee O'Neil – backing vocals (7)
- Alex Rowe – backing vocals (7), backing vocals on "Swing It"
- Claytoven Richardson – backing vocals (11)
- Jeanie Tracy – backing vocals (11)

String section on "Gone"

- Keith Andes – string arrangements
- Bill Meyers – string arrangements, conductor
- Larry Corbett and Suzie Katayama – cello
- John Scanion and Evan Wilson – viola
- Henry Ferber, Armen Garabedian, Bob Peterson and John Wittenberg – violin

Orchestra on "I Thought We Were Still In Love"

- Mark Portmann – arrangements and conductor
- Joe Soldo – contractor
- Jonathan Barrack Griffiths, Seth Wittner and Terry Woodson – copyists
- Ed Dumler – oboe
- Chuck Berghofer and John Clayton – bass
- Christine Ermacoff, Barbara Hunter, Armen Ksajikian, Earl Madison, Frederick Sekoya and John Walz – cello
- Amy Wilkins – harp
- Nirana Granat, Roland Kato, Carole Mukogawa, Jody Rubin, Harry Shirinian and Ray Tischer – viola
- Dixie Blackstone, Darius Campo, Ron Clark, Assa Drori, Ronald Folsom, Endre Granat, Gwenn Heller, Karen Jones, Peter Kent, Natalie Leggett, Dimitrie Leivici, Rene Mandel, Donald Palmer, Chris Reutinger, Bob Sanov, Haim Shtrum, Spiro Stamos and Mari Tsumura – violin

Choir on "Let Somebody Know"

- Bridgette Bryant, Bunny Hull, Arnold McCuller, Lori Perry, Valerie Pinkston-Mayo and Will Wheaton

== Charts ==
Chart (1995)	Peak position
Austrian Albums (Ö3 Austria)	40
Dutch Albums (Album Top 100)	48
Scottish Albums (Official Charts)	37
UK Albums (Official Charts)	10
US Billboard 200	114
US Top R&B/Hip-Hop Albums (Billboard)	38
