= Good Morning Heartache =

1946 single by Billie Holiday

Single by Billie Holiday
- B-side: "No Good Man"
- Released: 1946
- Recorded: 1946
- Genre: Jazz, blues
- Length: 3:05
- Label: Decca
- Songwriters: Irene Higginbotham, Ervin Drake, Dan Fisher

Billie Holiday singles chronology
"God Bless the Child" (1942)	"Good Morning Heartache" (1946)	"I Cover the Waterfront" (1946)

"Good Morning Heartache" is a song written by Irene Higginbotham, Ervin Drake, and Dan Fisher. It was recorded by jazz singer Billie Holiday on January 22, 1946.

== Personnel ==
Bill Stegmeyer and his Orchestra (Decca Session No. 54) New York City, January 22, 1946: with Chris Griffin (trumpet), Joe Guy (trumpet), Bill Stegmeyer (alto saxophone), Hank Ross (tenor saxophone), Bernie Kaufman (tenor saxophone), Armand Camgros (tenor saxophone), Joe Springer (piano), Tiny Grimes (guitar), John Simmons (bass), Sidney Catlett (drums), Billie Holiday (vocal) + 4 strings.

== Diana Ross version ==
"Good Morning Heartache"

Single by Diana Ross

from the album Lady Sings the Blues
- B-side: "God Bless the Child"
- Released: December 18, 1972
- Recorded: 1972
- Studio: Motown
- Genre: Jazz, blues
- Length: 2:20
- Label: Motown
- Songwriters: Irene Higginbotham, Ervin Drake, Dan Fisher

Diana Ross singles chronology
"I'm Still Waiting" (1971)	"Good Morning Heartache" (1972)	"Touch Me in the Morning" (1973)

The song was recorded by singer Diana Ross when she portrayed Holiday in the film, Lady Sings the Blues, in 1972. Ross's recording reached numbers 20 and 34 on the US Billboard R&B and pop charts, respectively, and also entered the top ten on the Easy Listening chart.

=== Charts ===
Chart performance for "Good Morning Heartache" by Diana Ross
Chart (1972–1973)	Peak position
Canada Top Singles (RPM)	44
US Billboard Hot 100	34
US Hot R&B/Hip-Hop Songs (Billboard)	20
US Adult Contemporary (Billboard)	8
US Cashbox Top 100	30
