= Mahogany (film) =

1975 film by Berry Gordy

- Movie poster by Bill Gold illustrated by Bob Peak.
- Directed by: Berry Gordy
- Screenplay by: John Byrum
- Story by: Toni Amber
- Produced by: Jack Ballard; Rob Cohen
- Starring: Diana Ross; Billy Dee Williams; Jean-Pierre Aumont; Nina Foch; Beah Richards; Marisa Mell; Anthony Perkins
- Cinematography: David Watkin
- Edited by: Peter Zinner
- Music by: Michael Masser
- Production company: Motown Productions
- Distributed by: Paramount Pictures
- Release date: October 8, 1975
- Running time: 109 minutes
- Country: United States
- Language: English
- Budget: $3.5 million
- Box office: $5,000,000

Mahogany is a 1975 American romantic drama film directed by Berry Gordy and produced by Motown Productions. The Motown founder Gordy took over the film direction after British filmmaker Tony Richardson was dismissed from the film. Mahogany stars Diana Ross as Tracy Chambers, a struggling fashion design student who rises to become a popular fashion designer in Rome. It was released on October 8, 1975. The soundtrack included the single "Theme from Mahogany (Do You Know Where You're Going To)", which peaked at number one on the Billboard Hot 100 chart in January 1976.

== Plot ==
Tracy Chambers dreams of becoming a fashion designer and has worked her way up to assistant to the head buyer at a luxury department store in Chicago. Her supervisor, Miss Evans, believes that Tracy's night school courses will interfere with her responsibilities at the store. Her aunt, however, encourages her and visits prospective buyers, who tell Tracy her designs are good for Paris but not for Chicago.

One evening, she gets into a shouting match with Brian Walker, a local activist fighting against gentrification in their community.

Sean McAvoy, a fashion photographer, comes to the department store to photograph models, with whom he is dissatisfied. He mistakes Tracy for a new model and creates an impromptu shoot with her, featuring a rainbow-colored gown made by her aunt. As Sean prepares to leave Chicago, he invites Tracy to Rome.

Tracy again encounters Brian during her walk to work and surreptitiously pours milk into his bullhorn's mouthpiece. Brian assumes that one of the construction workers has played a prank on him and a fight begins. Brian is arrested, and Tracy bails him out. Brian becomes her boyfriend, but the relationship does not last long as he does not support Tracy's aspirations.

Sean reinvents Tracy as "Mahogany," and she becomes an in-demand fashion model. An uneasy relationship develops with Sean, who is possessive and jealous of anyone vying for Tracy's attention. Tracy, feeling she owes Sean for her new career, reluctantly agrees to sleep with him. Sean's implied latent homosexuality makes the union a failure. Brian fails to persuade Tracy to return home with him to support him in his political aspirations.

During their next photo shoot, Sean causes an accident in which he's killed and Tracy sustains severe injuries. A new benefactor, Count Christian Rosetti, lends Tracy his villa for her recovery and a studio space in which she may create her own fashion label. Because of the tremendous job pressures, Tracy becomes demanding and cruel to her employees. She is unwilling to express her appreciation to her new benefactor by becoming his mistress. She finds her career emotionally empty and not what she dreamed it would be without Brian's love and support. Following the tremendous success of her first collection, Tracy must decide whether to continue with her empty life in Rome or return to the man she loves in Chicago and use her talents to boost his political prospects. She returns to Chicago and reunites with Brian as he decides to run for Congress.

== Cast ==
- Diana Ross as Tracy Chambers
- Billy Dee Williams as Brian Walker
- Anthony Perkins as Sean McAvoy
- Jean-Pierre Aumont as Count Christian Rosetti
- Beah Richards as Florence
- Nina Foch as Miss Evans
- Marisa Mell as Carlotta Gavina
- Lenard Norris as Wil
- Jerome Arnold as Campaign Worker
- Pemon Rami as Campaign Worker
- Obelo as Campaign Worker
- Ira Rogers as Stalker
- Kristine Cameron as Instructress
- Ted Liss as Sweatshop Foreman
- Bruce Vilanch as Dressmaker
- Don Howard as Dress Manufacturer
- Albert Rosenberg as Dress Manufacturer
- Marvin Corman as Cab Driver
- E. Rodney Jones as Radio Announcer (voice)
- Dan Daniel as Giuseppe (as Daniel Daniele)
- Princess Irene Galitzine as herself
- Jacques Stany as Auctioneer – Fashion Show

== Production ==
The luxury department store was modeled after and filmed at Marshall Fields on State Street in Chicago.

== Soundtrack ==
Mahogany was the second original motion picture soundtrack by Diana Ross, following her 1972 release Lady Sings the Blues. The soundtrack included the single "Theme from Mahogany (Do You Know Where You're Going To)", which peaked at number-one on the Billboard Hot 100 chart in January 1976. The single's B-side, "No One's Gonna Be a Fool Forever", was taken from Ross's Last Time I Saw Him album of 1973. The soundtrack reached #19 in the US and sold over a million copies worldwide.

=== Track listing ===
All tracks composed by Michael Masser, except where indicated:

=== Side one ===
1. "Theme from Mahogany (Do You Know Where You're Going To)" (lyrics: Gerry Goffin) – 3:25
2. "Feeling Again" – 3:22
3. "You Don't Ever Have to Be Alone" – 2:40
4. "Can You Hear It in My Music" – 3:38
5. "Christian's Theme" – 1:46
6. "After You" – 2:17
7. "Theme from Mahogany" (Instrumental) – 3:52

=== Side two ===
1. "My Hero Is a Gun" – 3:18
2. "Cat Fight" (Gil Askey) – 1:31
3. "Erucu" (Don Daniels, Jermaine Jackson) – 3:34
4. "Let's Go Back to Day One" (Gil Askey, Gloria Jones, Patrice Holloway) – 1:42
5. "Tracy" (Gil Askey) – 2:14
6. "She's the Ideal Girl" (Don Daniels, Jermaine Jackson) – 2:46
7. "Sweets (And Other Things)" – 2:01
8. "Mahogany Suite" – 5:31

=== Weekly charts ===
Chart (1975–1976)	Peak position
Australia (Kent Music Report)	43
Canada Top Albums/CDs (RPM)	6
Italian Albums (Musica e dischi)	25
Dutch Albums (Album Top 100)	10
US Billboard 200	19
US Top R&B/Hip-Hop Albums (Billboard)	15

=== Year-end charts ===
Chart (1976)	Position
US Billboard 200	86

== Release and reception ==
On Rotten Tomatoes the film has an approval rating of 29% based on reviews from 21 critics. Jay Cocks, of Time, commented that "movies as frantically bad as Mahogany can be enjoyed on at least one level: the spectacle of a lot of people making fools of themselves". While praising Perkins' performance, he panned the direction, the plot and Ross' acting, and described Ross' wardrobe, designed by herself as "apparently inspired by some Oriental version of Star Trek".

Mahogany was released on VHS home video in the 1990s, and was issued on DVD on May 1, 2007.

== Awards and nominations ==
Award	Category	Nominee(s)	Result	Ref.
Academy Awards	Best Original Song	"Theme from Mahogany (Do You Know Where You're Going To)"; Music by Michael Masser; Lyrics by Gerry Goffin	Nominated	

The film is recognized by the American Film Institute in this list:

- 2004: AFI's 100 Years...100 Songs:
  - "Theme from Mahogany (Do You Know Where You're Going To)" – Nominated

== See also ==
- List of American films of 1975
