= Diana (album) =

1980 album by Diana Ross

Studio album by Diana Ross
- Released: May 22, 1980
- Recorded: December 1979 – March 1980
- Studios: Power Station, New York City
- Genres: R&B; disco; pop; soul; dance-pop
- Length: 34:17
- Label: Motown
- Producers: Nile Rodgers; Bernard Edwards

Diana Ross chronology
20 Golden Greats (1979)	Diana (1980)	To Love Again (1981)

Singles from Diana
- 1. "Upside Down" Released: June 18, 1980; 2. "I'm Coming Out" Released: August 22, 1980; 3. "My Old Piano" Released: September 19, 1980

Diana (stylized on the cover as diana) is the eleventh studio album by American singer Diana Ross, released on May 22, 1980, by Motown Records. The album is the best-selling studio album of Ross's career, spawning three international hit singles, including the number-one hit "Upside Down".

In 2020, Rolling Stone named Diana the 394th greatest album of all time.

== Conception ==
Following the US success of her 1979 album The Boss, Ross wanted a fresher, more modern sound. Having heard Nile Rodgers of Chic's work in the famous Manhattan disco club Studio 54, Ross approached him about creating a new album of material for her that stated where she felt she was in her life and career at the period.

On an episode of TV One's Unsung, Nile Rodgers said that the majority of the songs were crafted after direct conversations with Ross. She had reportedly said to Rodgers and Bernard Edwards that she wanted to turn her career “upside down” and wanted to “have fun again.” As a result, Rodgers and Edwards wrote the songs "Upside Down" and "Have Fun (Again)". After running into several drag queens in a club dressed as Ross, Rodgers wrote "I'm Coming Out". Only "My Old Piano" came from their normal songwriting processes.

Initially, Ross was not pleased with the album's results. Following a preview of the record to be released in the aftermath of the anti-disco backlash, Frankie Crocker, an influential New York City disc jockey, warned Ross that releasing the album in its original state would even lead to the end of her career. Ross remixed the entire album, assisted by Motown engineer Russ Terrana, removing extended instrumental passages and speeding up the tracks' tempos. Ross also re-recorded all her lead vocals so that they were front and center and not overshadowed by the music.

The remixing of the master tapes was performed without the knowledge or approval of Rodgers and Edwards. When they were presented with the "official" version of diana, the producers publicly objected and, at one point, even considered removing their names from the album's list of credits. Motown and Ross persisted, and the version released was Terrana's more commercial mix of the album.

Rodgers and Edwards were contracted by Motown to produce a follow-up album, but, as Ross left the label, it was never created. Rodgers and Edwards sued Motown, unsuccessfully claiming that they were owed monies for creating and recording the original version of the album. In 1989, Rodgers and Ross collaborated on Workin' Overtime (No. 3 US R&B), released upon Ross's return to Motown. Edwards produced the 1984 single, "Telephone" (No. 13 US R&B), from Ross' Swept Away album, released on the RCA label. Rodgers played guitar on the new wave song, "It's Your Move", from the same album.

The cover art was photographed by famed photographer Francesco Scavullo. For the shoot, she borrowed jeans from supermodel Gia Carangi.

== Critical reception ==
Professional ratings
Review scores
Source	Rating
AllMusic	5/5 stars
Robert Christgau	A−
Pitchfork	9.5/10
The Rolling Stone Album Guide	3.5/5 stars
Smash Hits	5/10
Tom Hull – on the Web	A−

Robert Christgau, writing for The Village Voice, gave the album an A− rating. He remarked that "not since Lady Sings the Blues has Ms. R. been forced into such a becoming straitjacket. Her perky angularity and fit-to-burst verve could have been designed for Rodgers & Edwards's synergy – you'd swear she was as great a singer as Alfa Anderson herself. And Nile is showing off more axemanship than any rhythm guitarist in history."

In a retrospective review, Charity Stafford from AllMusic called the album "Ross' best solo record." She found that "Ross sounds more forceful than she had in years. The helium-toned style of her early hits with the Supremes is worlds away from the assertive way she rips into the funky hit "Upside Down." [...] The glossy Chic production might sound a bit dated to some ears, but it's matured much better than many similar albums of the era."

In her 2003 review of Diana's deluxe edition, Daryl Easlea from BBC Music wrote: "Diana is an artistic portrayal of complete freedom; Rodgers and Edwards' writing symbolises Ross' breaking free of the shackles of Motown on one level, but moreover, the work has a universality; celebrating gayness, blackness, equality; an album of challenging ideas, friendship and freedom."

Rolling Stone ranked the album No. 394 on its 2020 edition of the 500 Greatest Albums of All Time list.

== Chart performance ==
Partly due to the controversy between Ross, Motown, and Nile Rodgers/Bernard Edwards, Motown released the album without a lead single. This was unheard of, especially for a label like Motown. However, by its 4th week leading into summer, the album was already nearing the top 10. "Upside Down" eventually was chosen by the label and radio programmers. "Upside Down" made a rare vaulted move in its fifth week from number 49 to number 10. By the middle of summer 1980, Ross chalked up her fifth number one single.

The album spent 17 weeks at the top of Billboard's R&B/Dance chart. Reaching number two on the Billboard 200 chart and number one on the Billboard Soul Albums Chart for 8 consecutive weeks, as well as yielding two top 10 singles on the Billboard Hot 100, including the number-one single "Upside Down", the album would sell over one million copies in the United States and be certified Platinum by the Recording Industry Association of America (RIAA). In the UK it went Gold and spun off three successful singles; "Upside Down" (No. 2), "My Old Piano" (No. 5) and "I'm Coming Out" (No. 13). A fourth single, "Tenderness", was also released in certain territories, reaching the top 40 in the Netherlands, and was later included on several greatest hits compilations.

"I'm Coming Out" has since become an anthem for the LGBT movement.

Some thirty years after its release, Diana remains Ross's best-selling studio album to date having sold a total of over 10 million copies worldwide, according to music critic Graham Reid.

Diana was one of four albums written and produced by Edwards and Rodgers in 1980, the other three being Sister Sledge's Love Somebody Today, Sheila and B. Devotion's King of the World including European hit single "Spacer", and Chic's fourth studio album Real People.

Following the release of two more singles, the duet "Endless Love" with Lionel Richie and "It's My Turn", both worldwide hits, Ross left Motown and signed a then record-breaking $20 million recording deal with RCA Records. The first album for the label was 1981's self-produced Why Do Fools Fall in Love, which went platinum and spawned two Top 10 hits in the US. Diana was remastered and released as a double CD in 2003 containing the original Chic mixes and the Motown final mixes, unremixed versions, together with a selection of other Motown dance tracks from the same period.

== Track listing ==
All songs written by Bernard Edwards and Nile Rodgers.

=== Original release ===
Side A
No.	Title	Length
1.	"Upside Down"	4:05
2.	"Tenderness"	3:52
3.	"Friend to Friend"	3:19
4.	"I'm Coming Out"	5:24

Side B
No.	Title	Length
1.	"Have Fun (Again)"	5:57
2.	"My Old Piano"	3:55
3.	"Now That You're Gone"	3:59
4.	"Give Up"	3:45

=== 2001 (UK) / 2003 (US) deluxe edition ===
CD 1
No.	Title	Length
1.	"Upside Down"	4:05
2.	"Tenderness"	3:52
3.	"Friend to Friend"	3:19
4.	"I'm Coming Out"	5:24
5.	"Have Fun (Again)"	5:57
6.	"My Old Piano"	3:55
7.	"Now That You're Gone"	3:59
8.	"Give Up"	3:45
9.	"Upside Down" (Original Chic Mix)	4:17
10.	"Tenderness" (Original Chic Mix)	5:10
11.	"Friend to Friend" (Original Chic Mix)	3:20
12.	"I'm Coming Out" (Original Chic Mix)	6:01
13.	"Have Fun (Again)" (Original Chic Mix)	7:09
14.	"My Old Piano" (Original Chic Mix)	4:52
15.	"Now That You're Gone" (Original Chic Mix)	3:40
16.	"Give Up" (Original Chic Mix)	3:59

CD 2
No.	Title	Length
1.	"Love Hangover" (Extended Alternate Mix)	10:25
2.	"Your Love Is So Good for Me" (12-Inch Version)	6:36
3.	"Top of the World"	3:09
4.	"Lovin', Livin' and Givin'" (Ross Album Remix)	5:12
5.	"What You Gave Me" (12-Inch Version)	6:08
6.	"You Were the One"	4:04
7.	"The Diana Ross & the Supremes Medley of Hits" (12-inch Mix)	9:59
8.	"No One Gets the Prize"/"The Boss" (12-Inch Re-Edit)	9:41
9.	"I Ain't Been Licked" (12-inch Mix)	5:18
10.	"Fire Don't Burn"	3:26
11.	"We Can Never Light That Old Flame Again" (Alternate Mix)	4:38
12.	"You Build Me Up to Tear Me Down"	5:42
13.	"Sweet Summertime Livin'"	4:25

== Personnel ==
Credits are adapted from the Diana liner notes.

Musicians

- Diana Ross – lead vocals
- Alfa Anderson – background vocals
- Fonzi Thornton – background vocals
- Luci Martin – background vocals
- Michelle Cobbs – background vocals
- Bernard Edwards – bass guitar
- Nile Rodgers – guitar
- Tony Thompson – drums
- Andy Schwartz - keyboards
- Raymond Jones – Fender Rhodes piano
- Eddie Daniels – saxophone
- Meco Monardo – trombone
- Bob Milliken – trumpet
- Valerie Haywood (The Chic Strings) – strings
- Cheryl Hong (The Chic Strings) – strings
- Karen Milne (The Chic Strings) – strings
- Gene Orloff – concertmaster

Production

- Bernard Edwards – producer for Chic Organization Ltd.
- Nile Rodgers – producer for Chic Organization Ltd.
- Bob Clearmountain – engineer proposed side A; tracks 1–4
- Bill Scheniman – engineer proposed side B; tracks 1–4
- James Farber – engineer
- Neil Dorfsman – engineer
- Ralph Osborn – engineer
- Abdoulaye Soumare – assistant engineer
- Jeff Hendrickson – assistant engineer
- Lucy Laurie – assistant engineer
- Peter Robbins – assistant engineer
- Dennis King – mastering

- All songs originally recorded at Power Station in New York. Lead vocal re-recordings: Electric Lady, New York; Motown/Hitsville U.S.A. Studios, Hollywood, California.
- All songs originally mixed at Power Station, New York. Remixed by Russ Terrana and Diana Ross at Artisan Sound Recorders, Hollywood, California.
- Mastered at Atlantic Studios, N.Y.

== Charts ==
=== Weekly charts ===
Weekly chart performance for Diana
Chart (1980)	Peak position
Australia Albums (Kent Music Report)	17
Austrian Albums (Ö3 Austria)	8
Canada Top Albums/CDs (RPM)	8
Dutch Albums (Album Top 100)	4
Finnish Albums (Suomen virallinen lista)	5
French Albums (SNEP)	1
German Albums (Offizielle Top 100)	5
Italian Albums (Musica e dischi)	3
Norwegian Albums (VG-lista)	3
Portuguese Albums (Musica & Som)	5
Swedish Albums (Sverigetopplistan)	1
UK Albums (Official Charts)	12
US Billboard 200	2
US Top R&B/Hip-Hop Albums (Billboard)	1

=== Year-end charts ===
Annual chart rankings for Diana
Chart (1980)	Position
Dutch Albums (Album Top 100)	32
German Albums (Offizielle Top 100)	49
Italian Albums (Musica e dischi)	23
US Billboard 200	95
US Top R&B/Hip-Hop Albums (Billboard)	7

Chart (1981)	Position
Italian Albums (Musica e dischi)	40

== Certifications ==
Certifications and sales for Diana
Region	Certification	Certified units/sales
Canada (Music Canada)	Platinum	100,000^{^}
Netherlands (NVPI)	Gold	50,000^{^}
United Kingdom (BPI)	Gold	100,000^{^}
United States (RIAA)	Platinum	1,000,000^{^}
^{^} Shipments figures based on certification alone.

== See also ==
- List of Billboard number-one R&B albums of 1980
