= Reach Out and Touch (Somebody's Hand) =

Single by Diana Ross

from the album Diana Ross
- B-side: "Dark Side of the World"
- Released: April 1970
- Recorded: 1969
- Genre: Soul
- Length: 2:59
- Label: Motown; M 1165
- Songwriter: Nickolas Ashford, Valerie Simpson
- Producer: Nickolas Ashford, Valerie Simpson

Diana Ross singles chronology
"Reach Out and Touch (Somebody's Hand)" (1970)	"Ain't No Mountain High Enough" (1970)

"Reach Out and Touch (Somebody's Hand)" is the debut solo single of singer Diana Ross, released in April 1970 as the first single from her solo self-titled debut 1970 album by Motown Records.

== Background ==
Diana Ross, having just left The Supremes after a decade of serving as that group's lead singer, went through a difficult situation trying to piece a solo album together. With Nickolas Ashford and Valerie Simpson writing and producing for her, and Paul Riser arranging, Ross recorded "Reach Out and Touch", which carried a heavy gospel influence, and was one of the few songs the singer recorded to express her social conscience, previously experimented with Supremes singles such as "Love Child" and "I'm Livin' in Shame". While the song's initial success fell short of expectations, "Reach Out and Touch" became one of Ross' most popular and notable songs. During her concert performances of the song, Ross often had the whole crowd turn to their neighbors, and "reach out and touch" their hands. Ross also performed this song as the finale for the Nobel Peace Prize Concert held in Oslo, Norway, in 2008.

== Reception ==
Cash Box said that "Diana Ross takes hold of a slow blues-waltz message ballad and turns it into something all her own," and praised the vocal performance and the production. Record World reviewed the single, saying that "Diana Ross is great on her own."

== Personnel ==
- Lead vocals by Diana Ross.
- Background vocals by Ashford & Simpson.
- Instrumentation by the Funk Brothers.
- Written and produced by Ashford & Simpson.

== Chart history ==
"Reach Out and Touch" peaked at number 20 on the Billboard Hot 100, number 10 on the Cash Box Top 100, and number 7 on the R&B charts with 500,000 copies sold. It was also a hit in the United Kingdom, making number 33 on the UK Singles Chart in August 1970.

Chart (1970)	Peak position
Canada RPM Top Singles	23
Netherlands (Dutch Top 40)	13
UK Singles (OCC)	33
US Billboard Hot 100	20
US Best Selling Soul Singles (Billboard)	7
US Adult Contemporary (Billboard)	18
US Cash Box Top 100	10

== The Supremes & The Four Tops version ==
In 1970, the same year that Ross released "Reach Out and Touch" as her first solo single, the song was also covered by the group that she had just left at the start of that year, The Supremes (now fronted by Jean Terrell, along with other members Mary Wilson and Cindy Birdsong). The Supremes' version was a duet with fellow Motown Records artists The Four Tops on the two group's joint album The Magnificent Seven released by Motown toward the end of 1970. In one of her autobiographies, Mary Wilson mentioned that some fans at the post-Ross Supremes concerts used to call out requesting that The Supremes would sing this record live, as some fans erroneously recalled that it had been The Supremes' version, and not Ross's, that had charted as a hit Billboard single in early 1970.

Chart (1970)	Peak position
Australia (Kent Music Report)	56

== In popular culture ==
- On Saturday, July 28, 1984, Vicki McClure sang "Reach Out and Touch" before an estimated TV audience of 2.5 billion people during the Opening Ceremonies of the 1984 Summer Olympic Games held in Los Angeles, CA.
- Ashford & Simpson performed the song with Teddy Pendergrass in the Philadelphia portion of Live Aid in 1985. In 2005, Ross performed the song in the closing of Tsunami Aid: A Concert of Hope.
- Gospel artist CeCe Winans sang "Reach Out and Touch" on Memorial Day in Washington, DC in 2007.
- This song is one of the six most common used in the grand finale medley of the Woolworths Carols in the Domain concerts in Australia since 1982/83.
- The 4th episode of series 18 of Spitting Image features Diana, Princess of Wales singing a variation of the song entitled "Reach Out and Touch (Anybody's Hand)", satirizing her attempts to stay in the public's good favor following her divorce from Charles III. (Still known as Prince of Wales at the time)
