= Diana Ross (1970 album) =

Studio album by Diana Ross
- Released: June 19, 1970
- Recorded: September 1969 – March 1970
- Genre: R&B
- Length: 36:58
- Label: Motown
- Producers: Nickolas Ashford & Valerie Simpson; Johnny Bristol

Diana Ross chronology
Diana Ross (1970)	Everything Is Everything (1970)

Singles from Diana Ross
- 1. "Reach Out and Touch (Somebody's Hand)" Released: April 1970; 2. "Ain't No Mountain High Enough" Released: July 16, 1970

Diana Ross is the debut solo studio album by American singer Diana Ross, released on June 19, 1970 by Motown Records. The ultimate test to see if the former Supremes frontwoman could make it as a solo act, the album was overseen by the songwriting-producing team of Nickolas Ashford & Valerie Simpson, who had Ross re-record several of the songs the duo had recorded on other Motown acts. Johnny Bristol, producer of her final single with The Supremes, contributed on The Velvelettes cover "These Things Will Keep Me Loving You."

The album reached number 19 on the US Billboard 200 and peaked at number one on the US Top R&B/Hip-Hop Albums. Diana Ross would later go on to sell 500,000 copies in the United States. Ross' first solo single, "Reach Out and Touch (Somebody's Hand)", sold over 500,000 copies in the US, but was somewhat of a disappointment in terms of chart success, when it charted at number 20 on the Billboard Hot 100. Its follow-up, a cover of Marvin Gaye & Tammi Terrell's "Ain't No Mountain High Enough", peaked at number one on the Hot 100, selling approximately 1,245,000 copies in the US, while garnering a Grammy Award nomination for Best Female Pop Vocal Performance.

The 2002 Expanded Edition re-release of the album featured a number of bonus tracks, including four from her unreleased sessions with 5th Dimension producer Bones Howe. These included two Laura Nyro covers which would subsequently be recorded by Barbra Streisand for her 1971 album Stoney End as well as "Love's Lines, Angles and Rhymes" which become a 5th Dimension hit in 1971.

== Background ==
In early 1967, the name of the Supremes was changed briefly to "The Supremes with Diana Ross" before changing officially to "Diana Ross & the Supremes" by mid-summer.

The Supremes' name change fueled already present rumors of a solo career for Ross and contributed to the professional and personal dismantling of the group. In fact, Gordy intended to replace Ross with Barbara Randolph as early as the fall of 1966, but changed his mind and instead kept Ross in the group for several more years.

On June 29, 1967, the group returned to the Flamingo Hotel in Las Vegas as "Diana Ross & the Supremes".

Reflections, released in 1968, it was the first regular studio LP to display the new billing of the group as "Diana Ross & the Supremes."

By 1969, the label began plans for a Diana Ross solo career.

That same year, Johnny Bristol was preparing a new version of "Someday We'll Be Together", to be recorded by Motown act Jr. Walker & the All-Stars. Before finishing the track, Berry Gordy heard the music arrangements and thought the song would be a perfect first solo single for Ross, who was making her long-expected exit from the Supremes at the time. But when Gordy heard the completed song, he decided to release it as the final Diana Ross & the Supremes song although neither Mary Wilson nor Cindy Birdsong (the Supremes at that time) sang on the record.

"Someday We'll Be Together" was included on the final Diana Ross & the Supremes album, Cream of the Crop (1969). The song was a United States number-one hit on the Billboard Hot 100. Motown released two more albums by The Supremes featuring Ross, G.I.T. on Broadway and Greatest Hits Vol. 3, before the release of Farewell.

Ross gave her final performance with the group on January 14, 1970, at the Frontier Hotel in Las Vegas. A live recording of the performance was released later that year in a double-LP box set titled Farewell. At the final performance, the replacement for Diana Ross, Jean Terrell, was introduced.

Ross's first solo single, "Reach Out and Touch (Somebody's Hand)", released in early 1970.

Its follow-up, a cover of Marvin Gaye & Tammi Terrell's "Ain't No Mountain High Enough", peaked at number one on the Hot 100 becoming a million seller. Ross earned a Grammy Award nomination for the recording. Ross had previously recorded a cover of the song for the joint LP, Diana Ross & the Supremes Join the Temptations, released by The Supremes and The Temptations in 1968, with Ross sharing lead vocals with Dennis Edwards.

== Album cover ==
The album cover comes from a 1970 photo shoot with photographer Harry Langdon. Hundreds of photos were taken before eventually settling on a look which shunned the glamour Diana was previously known for, a decisive statement marking the turn in her career. Langdon described the look as an attempt to be novel and edgy after seeing so much of the same glamorous aesthetic.

== Critical reception ==
Professional ratings
Review scores
Source	Rating
AllMusic	4.5/5 stars
Christgau's Record Guide	C+
The Rolling Stone Album Guide	3/5 stars

Diana Ross received generally positive reviews from music critics. Ron Wynn of AllMusic, retrospectively gave the album four and half stars out of five, and stated that the album was the best album she had released while under contract with Motown, and perhaps her best work ever, and that it proved that she would be able to be successful without The Supremes.

Village Voice critic Robert Christgau said that while there were two or three good songs, the rest came off bland and boring, also saying that the album hadn't aged well since its release. In a positive review, Daryl Easlea of BBC stated that despite the album cover making it look more bland and uninteresting, the album and its songs made up for this.

== Commercial performance ==
Diana Ross made its debut on the US Billboard 200 on the chart dated July 11, 1970, debuting at number 71. On the chart issue dated October 3, 1970, it reached its peak at number 19.

== Track listing ==
=== Original release ===
All tracks written by Nickolas Ashford and Valerie Simpson, except where noted.

Side A
No.	Title	Writer(s)	Length
1.	"Reach Out and Touch (Somebody's Hand)"		3:02
2.	"Now That There's You"		3:27
3.	"You're All I Need to Get By"		3:24
4.	"These Things Will Keep Me Loving You"	Harvey Fuqua; Johnny Bristol; Sylvia Moy	3:06
5.	"Ain't No Mountain High Enough"		6:18

Side B
No.	Title	Length
1.	"Something on My Mind"	2:24
2.	"I Wouldn't Change the Man He Is"	3:15
3.	"Keep an Eye"	3:12
4.	"Where There Was Darkness"	3:12
5.	"Can't It Wait Until Tomorrow"	3:12
6.	"Dark Side of the World"	3:08

=== 2002 expanded edition ===
No.	Title	Writer(s)	Length
1.	"Reach Out and Touch (Somebody's Hand)"		3:02
2.	"Now That There's You"		3:27
3.	"You're All I Need to Get By"		3:24
4.	"These Things Will Keep Me Loving You"	Fuqua; Bristol; Moy	3:06
5.	"Ain't No Mountain High Enough"		6:18
6.	"Something on My Mind" (recorded live at The Grove, Los Angeles; August 7, 1970)		2:24
7.	"I Wouldn't Change the Man He Is"		3:15
8.	"Keep an Eye"		3:12
9.	"Where There Was Darkness"		3:12
10.	"Can't It Wait Until Tomorrow"		3:12
11.	"Dark Side of the World"		3:08
12.	"Something on My Mind" (Live)		2:37
13.	"Ain't No Mountain High Enough" (Alternate Mix)		6:06
14.	"Now That There's You" (Alternate Vocal Version)		3:08
15.	"These Things Will Keep Me Loving You" (Alternate Mix - produced by Johnny Bristol)	Fuqua; Bristol; Moy	3:13
16.	"Time and Love" (produced by Bones Howe)	Laura Nyro	4:08
17.	"Stoney End" (produced by Bones Howe)	Nyro	3:39
18.	"The Interim" (produced by Bones Howe)	Jimmy Webb	4:49
19.	"Love's Lines, Angles and Rhymes" (produced by Bones Howe)	Dorothea Joyce	4:02

== Personnel ==
- Diana Ross – lead vocals (all tracks)
- Nickolas Ashford & Valerie Simpson – producers, backing vocals (tracks A1–A3, A5–B6)
- Johnny Bristol – producer, additional vocals (on "These Things Will Keep Me Loving You")
- Paul Riser – arranger
- The Andantes – backing vocals
- Jackey Beavers – backing vocals
- Maxine & Julia Waters – backing vocals (on "These Things Will Keep Me Loving You")
- The Funk Brothers – instrumentation (all tracks)

Technical

- Harry Langdon – photography

== Charts ==
=== Weekly charts ===
Weekly chart performance for Diana Ross
Chart (1970)	Peak position
Canada Top Albums/CDs (RPM)	13
UK Albums (Official Charts)	14
US Billboard 200	19
US Top R&B/Hip-Hop Albums (Billboard)	1
US Cashbox Top Albums	9

=== Year-end charts ===
Year-end chart performance for Diana Ross
Chart (1970)	Position
US Billboard 200	96
US Top R&B/Hip-Hop Albums (Billboard)	47

== See also ==
- List of number-one R&B albums of 1970 (U.S.)
