= Touch Me in the Morning (album) =

Studio album by Diana Ross
- Released: June 22, 1973
- Recorded: 1971–1973
- Studios: Motown Recording Studios, Hollywood, California
- Genres: Pop; soul
- Length: 34:08
- Label: Motown
- Producers: Gil Askey; Michael Masser; Deke Richards; Michael Randall; Diana Ross; Berry Gordy, Jr. (exec.)

Diana Ross chronology
| Greatest Hits (1972) | Touch Me in the Morning (1973) | Diana & Marvin (1973) |

Singles from Touch Me in the Morning
- 1. "Touch Me in the Morning" Released: May 3, 1973; 2. "All of My Life" Released: 1973

Touch Me in the Morning is the fourth studio album by American singer Diana Ross, released on June 22, 1973, by Motown Records. The arrangements were by Gene Page, Tom Baird, Michael Randall, James Anthony Carmichael, Deke Richards, Gil Askey and Ross. The album was a major success for Ross, reaching number 5 on the Billboard 200.

== Reception ==
Professional ratings
Review scores
| Source | Rating |
|---|---|
| Allmusic | 3.5/5 stars |
| Christgau's Record Guide | C |

The album contained the hit title track, which became Diana Ross' second number 1 single on the US Billboard Hot 100 singles chart, and helped the album peak at number 5 on the US Billboard 200 albums chart.

In the UK the title track and "All of My Life" were both Top Ten singles. The album reached number 7 and was certified Gold by the BPI.

It includes the first tracks Diana would personally produce on one of her albums, "Imagine" and "Medley: Brown Baby/Save the Children". Several cuts here, including the closing Medley and "My Baby (My Baby, My Own)", were originally intended for the abandoned To The Baby album that Ross also worked on in this period. She would also begin working with her brother/songwriter, Arthur "T-Boy" Ross, during these sessions.

Several of the songs on the album are covers of classics, including John Lennon's "Imagine", Marvin Gaye's "Save the Children" and the Richard Rodgers' standard "Little Girl Blue". The album also includes her recording of "I Won't Last a Day Without You", released a year prior to The Carpenters' hit version, as well as covers of lesser known songs originally recorded by The Fifth Dimension ("Leave A Little Room") and Oscar Brown Jr ("Brown Baby").

== Track listing ==
1. "Touch Me in the Morning" (Michael Masser, Ron Miller) – 3:26
2. "All of My Life" (Michael Randall) – 3:31
3. "We Need You" (Deke Richards) – 3:44
4. "Leave a Little Room" (Michael Randall) – 3:37
5. "I Won't Last a Day Without You" (Roger Nichols, Paul Williams) – 3:49
6. "Little Girl Blue" (Lorenz Hart, Richard Rodgers) – 3:58
7. "My Baby (My Baby My Own)" (Tom Baird) – 2:45
8. "Imagine" (John Lennon) – 3:01
9. "Medley: Brown Baby/Save the Children" (Tom Baird/Renaldo Benson, Oscar Brown, Jr., Al Cleveland, Marvin Gaye) – 8:17

=== 2010 Expanded Edition ===
Touch Me in the Morning: Expanded Edition, released in January 2010, includes a newly remastered version of the original album plus previously unreleased mixes and alternate versions as well as two songs recorded during the same timeline: "Kewpie Doll", written and co-produced by Smokey Robinson, and "When We Grow Up", from Marlo Thomas' 1972 album Free to Be...You and Me.

Disc two of the expanded edition contains the entire previously unreleased To The Baby album, which includes covers of Michael Jackson's "Got To Be There" and Roberta Flack's "The First Time Ever I Saw Your Face", as well as the original title tune, written by Diana's brother Arthur "T-Boy" Ross. It also includes the medley, "Imagine/Save The Children", two songs that were split for the Touch Me In The Morning album, plus alternate original mixes of songs including "Young Mothers", which previously had been issued in 1983.

=== Track listing ===
Disc 1 (Touch Me In The Morning) [bonus tracks]

11. "Touch Me in the Morning" (alternate version #1)
12. "All of My Life" (alternate mix)
13. "We Need You" (alternate mix)
14. "Leave a Little Room" (alternate mix)
15. "Touch Me in the Morning" (alternate version #2)

Disc 2 (To The Baby)

1. "Part Of You"
2. "A Wonderful Guest"
3. "Young Mothers" (alternate version)
4. "The First Time Ever I Saw Your Face"
5. "Got To Be There"
6. "To The Baby"
7. "Brown Baby" (alternate version)
8. "My Baby (My Baby, My Own)" (alternate version)
9. "Turn Around" (alternate version)
10. "Imagine/Save the Children" (original edit/alternate version)
11. "Kewpie Doll"
12. "When We Grow Up" (from Free to Be... You and Me)

== Charts ==
| Chart (1973) | Peak position |
|---|---|
| Australia (Kent Music Report) | 20 |
| Canada Top Albums/CDs (RPM) | 5 |
| UK Albums (Official Charts) | 7 |
| US Billboard 200 | 5 |
| US Top R&B/Hip-Hop Albums (Billboard) | 1 |
| US Cashbox Top Albums | 3 |

== Certifications ==
| Region | Certification | Certified units/sales |
|---|---|---|
| United Kingdom (BPI) | Gold | 100,000^{^} |
^{^} Shipments figures based on certification alone.

== See also ==
- List of number-one R&B albums of 1973 (U.S.)
