= Everything Is Everything (Diana Ross album) =

Studio album by Diana Ross
- Released: November 3, 1970
- Genre: R&B
- Length: 40:13
- Label: Motown
- Producers: Deke Richards; Hal Davis

Diana Ross chronology
Diana Ross (1970)	Everything Is Everything (1970)	Diana! (1971)

Singles from Everything Is Everything
- 1. "I'm Still Waiting" Released: July 1971; 2. "Doobedood'ndoobe, Doobedood'ndoobe, Doobedood'ndoo" Released: April 1972

Everything Is Everything is the second studio album by American singer Diana Ross, released on November 3, 1970 by Motown Records. After her self-titled debut and its accompanying two singles, including "Ain't No Mountain High Enough", Motown rushed the release of its follow-up. Musicians Deke Richards and Hal Davis were commissioned to produce Everything is Everything as slightly more pop than her soulful debut with Ashford & Simpson and the album included cover versions of contemporary hits by The Beatles and The Carpenters.

The album reached number 42 on the US Billboard 200 and peaked at number five on the US Top R&B/Hip-Hop Albums, selling over 200,000 copies. Lead single "I'm Still Waiting" became a number-one hit in the UK in 1971, while follow-up "Doobedood'ndoobe, Doobedood'ndoobe, Doobedood'ndoo" reached number 12. Ross' rendering of Aretha Franklin's "Call Me (I Love You)" was nominated for a Grammy in 1971 in the Best Female R&B Vocal Performance category. An expanded edition of the album featuring remixes and unreleased outtakes had its first CD release in the US on April 18, 2008. It includes another Beatles cover ("Something") as well as "What Are You Doing the Rest of Your Life?" also recorded by Barbra Streisand.

== Critical reception ==
Professional ratings
Review scores
Source	Rating
Allmusic	4/5 stars
Christgau's Record Guide	C+

Allmusic editor Lindsay Planer wrote in his retrospective review that "although Everything Is Everything failed to exceed – or even meet – the chart achievements of its long-playing predecessor, many enthusiasts consider it to be a worthy companion."

== Track listing ==
=== Original release ===
Side A
No.	Title	Writer(s)	Length
1.	"My Place"	Hal Davis; Mel Larson; Jerry Marcellino	2:46
2.	"Ain't No Sad Song"	Davis; Berry Gordy; Chico Ross	2:42
3.	"Everything Is Everything"	Margaret Gordy	2:27
4.	"Baby It's Love"	Marvin Gaye; Anna Gordy Gaye; Charles Laskey	3:09
5.	"I'm Still Waiting"	Deke Richards	3:44
6.	"Doobedood'ndoobe, Doobedood'ndoobe, Doobedood'ndoo"	Richards	4:52

Side B
No.	Title	Writer(s)	Length
1.	"Come Together"	John Lennon; Paul McCartney	5:39
2.	"The Long and Winding Road"	Lennon; McCartney	3:26
3.	"I Love You (Call Me)"	Aretha Franklin	3:23
4.	"How About You"	Richards; Sandra Sanders; David Van De Pitte	2:47
5.	"(They Long to Be) Close to You"	Burt Bacharach; Hal David	4:07

=== 2008 expanded edition ===
No.	Title	Writer(s)	Length
1.	"My Place"	Davis; Larson; Marcellino	2:46
2.	"Ain't No Sad Song"	Davis; B. Gordy; Ross	2:42
3.	"Everything Is Everything"	M. Gordy	2:27
4.	"Baby It's Love"	Gaye; Gordy Gaye; Laskey	3:09
5.	"I'm Still Waiting"	Richards	3:44
6.	"Doobedood'ndoobe, Doobedood'ndoobe, Doobedood'ndoo"	Richards	4:52
7.	"Come Together"	Lennon; McCartney	6:40
8.	"The Long and Winding Road"	Lennon; McCartney	3:26
9.	"I Love You (Call Me)"	Franklin	3:23
10.	"How About You"	Richards; Sanders; Van De Pitte	2:47
11.	"(They Long to Be) Close to You"	Bacharach; David	4:07
12.	"Wish I Knew"	Debbie Dean; Richards	3:30
13.	"What Are You Doing the Rest of Your Life?"	Marilyn Bergman; Alan Bergman; Michel Legrand	3:25
14.	"Something"	George Harrison	3:11
15.	"Ain't No Sad Song"	Davis; Gordy; Ross	3:16
16.	"Baby It's Love" (Alternate Version)	Gaye; Gordy Gaye; Laskey	3:42
17.	"Come Together" (1982 Revelations Remix)	Lennon; McCartney	4:04
18.	"I'm Still Waiting" (1990 Phil Chill Remix)	Richards	4:08

== Charts ==
Chart performance for Everything Is Everything
Chart (1970)	Peak position
Canada Top Albums/CDs (RPM)	67
UK Albums (Official Charts)	31
US Billboard 200	42
US Top R&B/Hip-Hop Albums (Billboard)	5
US Cashbox Top Albums	31
