= Upside Down (Diana Ross song) =

1980 single by Diana Ross

- Side A of US single

Single by Diana Ross

from the album Diana
- B-side: "Friend to Friend"
- Released: June 18, 1980
- Studio: Power Station (New York City)
- Genre: Disco; R&B; funk
- Length: 4:05 (album); 3:37 (single)
- Label: Motown
- Songwriters: Nile Rodgers; Bernard Edwards
- Producers: Nile Rodgers; Bernard Edwards

Diana Ross singles chronology
"It's My House" (1979)	"Upside Down" (1980)	"I'm Coming Out" (1980)

Audio video
- "Upside Down" on YouTube

"Upside Down" is a song written and produced by Chic members Nile Rodgers and Bernard Edwards. It was recorded by American singer Diana Ross and issued on June 18, 1980, from Motown as the lead single from her eleventh studio album, Diana (1980). The song reached number one on the US Billboard Hot 100 chart on September 6, 1980, and stayed there for four weeks. It also peaked at number one on Billboard's Disco and Soul charts.

"Upside Down" also topped the singles charts in Australia, Denmark, Italy, New Zealand, Norway, South Africa, Sweden, and Switzerland. It reached number two on the UK Singles Chart, marking Ross's highest peak performance as a solo artist since "I'm Still Waiting" in 1971. The single received a nomination for Best Female R&B Vocal Performance at the 1981 Grammy Awards.

"Upside Down" is listed at No. 80 on Billboard's "Hot 100 60th Anniversary" (1958–2018).

== Background and recording ==
The song was written by Bernard Edwards and Nile Rodgers (of the band Chic). In the lyrics, the singer admits her boyfriend is not faithful. But her relationship with him sends her "upside down... inside out and round and round."

In a 2011 interview, Nile Rodgers said "Diana Ross was the first big star we ever worked with and we took it very seriously." Rodgers and Edwards interviewed her for several days. "This was the first time in her life somebody cared about who she was; what she was — everyone previously had treated her the way we had treated Sister Sledge — they got her in and said 'Sing this'. We (took a more personal approach)."

== Influence and legacy ==
Female rap duo Salt-N-Pepa covered the song for the Space Jam soundtrack, which was released on November 12, 1996. Hip-hop rapper MC Lyte sampled "Upside Down" on her November 12, 1996, hit "Cold Rock a Party (Remix)", featuring Missy Elliott and Puff Daddy. In 1999, the music group Risquée covered the song. Their version peaked at No. 25 in France and at No. 76 in Germany. Contemporary jazz/fusion group Pieces of a Dream covered the song on their 2001 album Acquainted with the Night. In 2003, Swedish band Alcazar interpolated the melody for their song "This Is the World We Live In", released in 2004. Thundercat released a cover of the song in November 2025.

== Charts ==
=== Weekly charts ===
Chart (1980)	Peak position
Australia (Kent Music Report)	1
Austria (Ö3 Austria Top 40)	2
Belgium (Ultratop 50 Flanders)	3
Canada Top Singles (RPM)	5
Canada Adult Contemporary (RPM)	1
Denmark (IFPI)	1
Europe (Eurochart Hot 100)	1
Finland (Suomen virallinen lista)	3
France (IFOP)	2
Ireland (IRMA)	3
Italy (Germano Ruscitto)	1
Italy (Musica e dischi)	1
Netherlands (Dutch Top 40)	2
Netherlands (Single Top 100)	3
New Zealand (Recorded Music NZ)	1
Norway (VG-lista)	1
South Africa (Springbok Radio)	1
Spain (AFYVE)	15
Sweden (Sverigetopplistan)	1
Switzerland (Schweizer Hitparade)	1
UK Singles (Official Charts)	2
US Billboard Hot 100	1
US Adult Contemporary (Billboard)	18
US Hot Disco Singles (Billboard)	1
US Hot Soul Singles (Billboard)	1
US Cash Box Top 100	1
US Record World Singles	1
West Germany (GfK)	3

Chart (1994)	Peak position
UK Club Chart (Music Week)	55

Chart (2026)	Peak position
France (SNEP)	160
Global 200 (Billboard)	160
Greece International (IFPI)	32
Ireland (IRMA)	21
Lithuania (AGATA)	62
UK Singles Chart (OCC)	26
US Hot Dance/Pop Songs (Billboard)	8

=== Year-end charts ===
Chart (1980)	Position
Australia (Kent Music Report)	15
Belgium (Ultratop 50 Flanders)	12
Canada Top Singles (RPM)	52
Netherlands (Dutch Top 40)	7
Netherlands (Single Top 100)	17
New Zealand (Recorded Music NZ)	18
South Africa (Springbok Radio)	11
Switzerland (Schweizer Hitparade)	4
US Billboard Hot 100	18
US Billboard Hot Soul Singles	19
US Cash Box Top 100	4
West Germany (Official German Charts)	44

=== Decade-end charts ===
Decade-end chart performance for "Upside Down"
Chart (1980–1989)	Rank
US Billboard Hot 100	16

=== All-time charts ===
Chart (1958–2018)	Position
US Billboard Hot 100	80

== Certifications and sales ==
Region	Certification	Certified units/sales
Canada (Music Canada)	Platinum	150,000^{^}
Denmark (IFPI Danmark)	Gold	45,000^{‡}
France	—	300,000
Italy (FIMI) sales since 2009	Gold	50,000^{‡}
Netherlands (NVPI)	Gold	100,000^{^}
New Zealand (RMNZ)	Platinum	30,000^{‡}
United Kingdom (BPI) Physical sales	Silver	250,000^{^}
United Kingdom (BPI) Digital sales + streams	Platinum	600,000^{‡}
United States (RIAA)	Gold	1,000,000^{^}
Streaming
Greece (IFPI Greece)	Gold	1,000,000^{†}
^{^} Shipments figures based on certification alone.^{‡} Sales+streaming figures based on certification alone.^{†} Streaming-only figures based on certification alone.

== In film, television and commercials ==
A cover of the song was used in a scene from the 1994 Disney home video Mickey's Fun Songs: Let's Go to the Circus!, in which the song accompanies a series of acrobatics performed by Michael Ashton and his family at the Ringling Bros. and Barnum & Bailey Circus.

In 2013, the song was used in a Mercedes-Benz commercial featuring chickens being moved around while their heads remain stationary as an example of the car brand's "magic body control." It was also used by Jaguar Cars in a parody of the Mercedes-Benz commercial.

In 2025, the song was used in the fifth season of the Netflix series Stranger Things.

King Charles III of the United Kingdom called "Upside Down" by Diana Ross one of his favorites, in a March 2025 program for Apple Music; "When I was much younger, it was absolutely impossible not to get up and dance when it was played!"

== See also ==
- List of number-one singles in Australia during the 1980s
- List of Billboard Hot 100 number ones of 1980
- List of Billboard number-one dance singles of 1980
- List of Cash Box Top 100 number-one singles of 1980
- List of European number-one hits of 1980
- List of number-one hits of 1980 (Italy)
- List of number-one singles from the 1980s (New Zealand)
- List of number-one singles and albums in Sweden
- List of number-one singles of the 1980s
- List of Hot Soul Singles number ones of 1980
- VG-lista 1964 to 1994
