= I'm Still Waiting (Diana Ross song) =

Single by Diana Ross

from the album Everything Is Everything
- B-side: "A Simple Thing Like Cry"
- Released: July 1971
- Recorded: 1970
- Studio: Hitsville U.S.A. (Studio A)
- Genre: Soul
- Label: Motown
- Songwriter: Deke Richards
- Producer: Deke Richards

Diana Ross singles chronology
"Surrender" (1971)	"I'm Still Waiting" (1971)	"Good Morning Heartache" (1972)

"I'm Still Waiting" is a popular song, written and produced by Deke Richards and recorded by American singer Diana Ross; it first appeared on Ross's 1970 album Everything Is Everything. The song reached No. 1 on the UK Singles Chart in August 1971. It also reached number one in Ireland.

"I'm Still Waiting" continued the vein of sophisticated soul as heard on Ross's breakthrough solo hit "Ain't No Mountain High Enough". However, it was only a modest success in the US, reaching No. 63 on the Billboard Hot 100 singles chart, and No. 40 on the R&B chart.

Although it was initially intended only as an album track, BBC Radio 1 disc jockey Tony Blackburn featured it heavily on his morning programme, and persuaded EMI—which at the time issued all Tamla Motown material in the UK—to release it as a single. It reached No. 1 on the UK Singles Chart for four weeks in August 1971; this prompted a retitling in the UK of the album Surrender as I'm Still Waiting.

== Charts ==
=== Weekly charts ===
Chart (1971–72)	Peak position
Australia (Kent Music Report)	69
Canada Top Singles (RPM)	81
Ireland (IRMA)	1
New Zealand (Listener)	11
UK (OCC)	1
US Billboard Hot 100	63
US Hot Soul Singles (Billboard)	40
US Cash Box Top 100	71

=== Year-end charts ===
Chart (1971)	Rank
Australia	167

== 1990 remix ==
The track was remixed by DJ Phil Chill in 1990 and was released as a single, reaching No. 21 in the UK Singles Chart. It is one of the few Ross remix songs to be released as a single.

=== Charts ===
==== Weekly charts ====
Chart (1990)	Peak position
Europe (Eurochart Hot 100)	59
Luxembourg (Radio Luxembourg)	12
UK Singles (OCC)	21

==== Year-end charts ====
Chart (1990)	Rank
UK Club Chart (Record Mirror)	46

== Cover versions ==
Former Supreme Scherrie Payne later covered this song for Ian Levine's UK Motorcity label.

Courtney Pine and Carroll Thompson had a minor UK hit single with the song in July 1990.
