= Theme from Mahogany (Do You Know Where You're Going To) =

Single by Diana Ross

from the album Mahogany and Diana Ross
- B-side: "No One's Gonna Be a Fool Forever"
- Released: September 24, 1975
- Recorded: 1975
- Genre: Soul
- Length: 3:25
- Label: Motown
- Songwriters: Michael Masser; Gerald Goffin
- Producer: Michael Masser

Diana Ross singles chronology
"Sorry Doesn't Always Make It Right" (1975)	"Theme from Mahogany (Do You Know Where You're Going To)" (1975)	"I Thought It Took a Little Time (But Today I Fell in Love)" (1976)

"Theme from Mahogany (Do You Know Where You're Going To)" is a song written by Michael Masser and Gerry Goffin and produced by Masser. It was initially recorded by American singer Thelma Houston in 1973, and then by Diana Ross as the theme to the 1975 Motown/Paramount film Mahogany that also starred Ross. The song was released on September 24, 1975 by Motown Records as the lead single for both the film's soundtrack and Ross' seventh studio album, Diana Ross. Masser and Goffin received a nomination for the Academy Award for Best Original Song at the 48th Academy Awards. Also, the song was nominated for AFI's 100 Years...100 Songs list constructed by the American Film Institute in 2004.

== Release and reception ==
The song was nominated for the Academy Award for Best Original Song. Diana Ross performed the song live at the 48th Academy Awards ceremony via satellite from Amsterdam.

Record World said that "Diana handles [the song] with consummate ease" and that "her frail but stunningly effective voice is captured amidst a soulful tapestry of sound."

== Track listing ==
7" vinyl single - US
No.	Title	Writer(s)	Length
1.	"Theme from Mahogany (Do You Know Where You're Going To)"	Gerry Goffin, Michael Masser	3:19
2.	"No One's Gonna Be a Fool Forever"	Michael Masser, Pam Sawyer	3:18

== Personnel ==
- Diana Ross – vocals
- Leland Sklar – electric bass
- Hal Blaine – drums
- Lee Holdridge – arranger

== Chart performance ==
=== Weekly charts ===
Chart (1975–1976)	Peak position
Australia (Kent Music Report)	38
Belgium (Ultratop 50 Flanders)	14
Belgium (Ultratop 50 Wallonia)	33
Canada Top Singles (RPM)	4
Canada Adult Contemporary (RPM)	3
Ireland (IRMA)	2
Italy (Musica e dischi)	6
Netherlands (Dutch Top 40)	4
Netherlands (Single Top 100)	4
New Zealand (Recorded Music NZ)	19
UK Singles (Official Charts)	5
US Billboard Hot 100	1
US Hot R&B/Hip-Hop Songs (Billboard)	14
US Adult Contemporary (Billboard)	1
US Cashbox Top 100	1

=== Year-end charts ===
Chart (1976)	Position
Canada Top Singles (RPM)	56
UK Singles (OCC)	73
US Billboard Hot 100	43
US Adult Contemporary (Billboard)	29
US Cashbox Top 100	51

== Other versions ==
- Singer Thelma Houston was the first artist to record the song in 1973.
- Polly Brown recorded the song in 1975.
- French singer Nicole Rieu released a French-language version the song (titled "En courant") as a single in 1976.
- Dinah Shore recorded the song for her album Dinah! in 1976.
- Johnny Mathis included the song on his album I Only Have Eyes for You in 1976.
- Amii Stewart recorded the song and released it as the first single from her 1994 cover album Lady to Ladies in 1994.
- American punk rock band Pinhead Gunpowder recorded the song for their 1994 EP Carry the Banner under the title "Mahogany".
- Shirley Bassey included the song on her album Sings the Movies in 1995.
- Mariah Carey included the song as a promotional single on the international versions of her compilation album #1's in 1998.
- Jennifer Lopez included the song on the international versions of her album On the 6 in 1999.
- Pete Yorn and Liz Phair recorded the song for his 2021 album Pete Yorn Sings the Classics.

== See also ==
- List of number-one adult contemporary singles of 1975 (U.S.)
- List of Billboard Hot 100 number-one singles of 1976
