= Touch Me in the Morning (song) =

1973 single by Diana Ross

- Solid center variant of the UK single

Single by Diana Ross

from the album Touch Me in the Morning
- B-side: "I Won't Last a Day Without You"
- Released: May 3, 1973
- Recorded: 1973
- Genre: Pop; R&B
- Length: 3:26 (single version)
- Label: Motown
- Songwriters: Ron Miller, Michael Masser
- Producers: Michael Masser, Tom Baird

Diana Ross singles chronology
"Good Morning Heartache" (1972)	"Touch Me in the Morning" (1973)	"You're a Special Part of Me" (1973)

Audio
- "Touch Me In The Morning" on YouTube

"Touch Me in the Morning" is a song recorded by Diana Ross on the Motown label. It was written by Ron Miller and Michael Masser, and produced by the latter and Tom Baird. It was released on May 3, 1973 as the first single from her album of the same name. In 1973, it became Ross's second solo No. 1 single on the Billboard Hot 100.

== Background and recording ==
It was conceived by then-unproven songwriter and producer Michael Masser. He had been recruited by Motown CEO Berry Gordy and A&R chief Suzanne de Passe. Masser teamed up with the proven ballad lyricist Ron Miller to write it.

According to Masser, in a video documentary about Ross, she "always tried to push hard to get the vocals right for this particular song", calling it a "draining experience" that resulted in several near-emotional breakdowns when she wasn't up to her abilities. It was recorded in the early morning hours, as was her custom after she began raising her children. In a Barbara Walters Mother's Day interview special, her second-oldest daughter, Tracee Ellis Ross, said Diana would put them to bed and record all night, in order to wake her children and send them to school the next morning.

== Release ==
Motown released the song as a single and it hit No. 1 on the Billboard Hot 100 singles chart, becoming her longest-charting record until 1980, remaining on the chart for 21 weeks. It also spent a week at No. 1 on the adult contemporary chart, her first No. 1 on that chart. Sherlie Matthews, Clydie King and Venetta Fields sang background vocals. Bob Babbitt played bass.

It marked a turning point in the career of Diana Ross, reinvigorating her singing career, coming immediately after her Academy Award nomination for Best Actress in her acting debut, Lady Sings the Blues.

== Charts ==
=== Weekly charts ===
Chart (1973)	Peak position
Australia (Kent Music Report)	5
Canada Top Singles (RPM)	6
Canada Adult Contemporary (RPM)	2
Spain	11
UK Singles (Official Charts)	9
US Billboard Hot 100	1
US Hot R&B/Hip-Hop Songs (Billboard)	5
US Adult Contemporary (Billboard)	1
US Cash Box Top 100	1

=== Year-end charts ===
Chart (1973)	Position
Australia	38
Canadian Top Singles (RPM)	66
US Billboard Hot 100	10
US Cash Box Top 100	5

== Personnel ==
- Lead vocals by Diana Ross
- Backing vocals by Sherlie Matthews, Venetta Fields, Clydie King
- Instrumentation by the Wrecking Crew
- Brass and strings by LA session musicians
- Arranged by Gene Page
- Producer: Michael Masser, Tom Baird
- Songwriter: Ron Miller, Michael Masser

== Bibliography ==
- Whitburn, Joel (1996). The Billboard Book of Top 40 Hits, 6th Edition (Billboard Publications)
