= Billie Holiday discography =

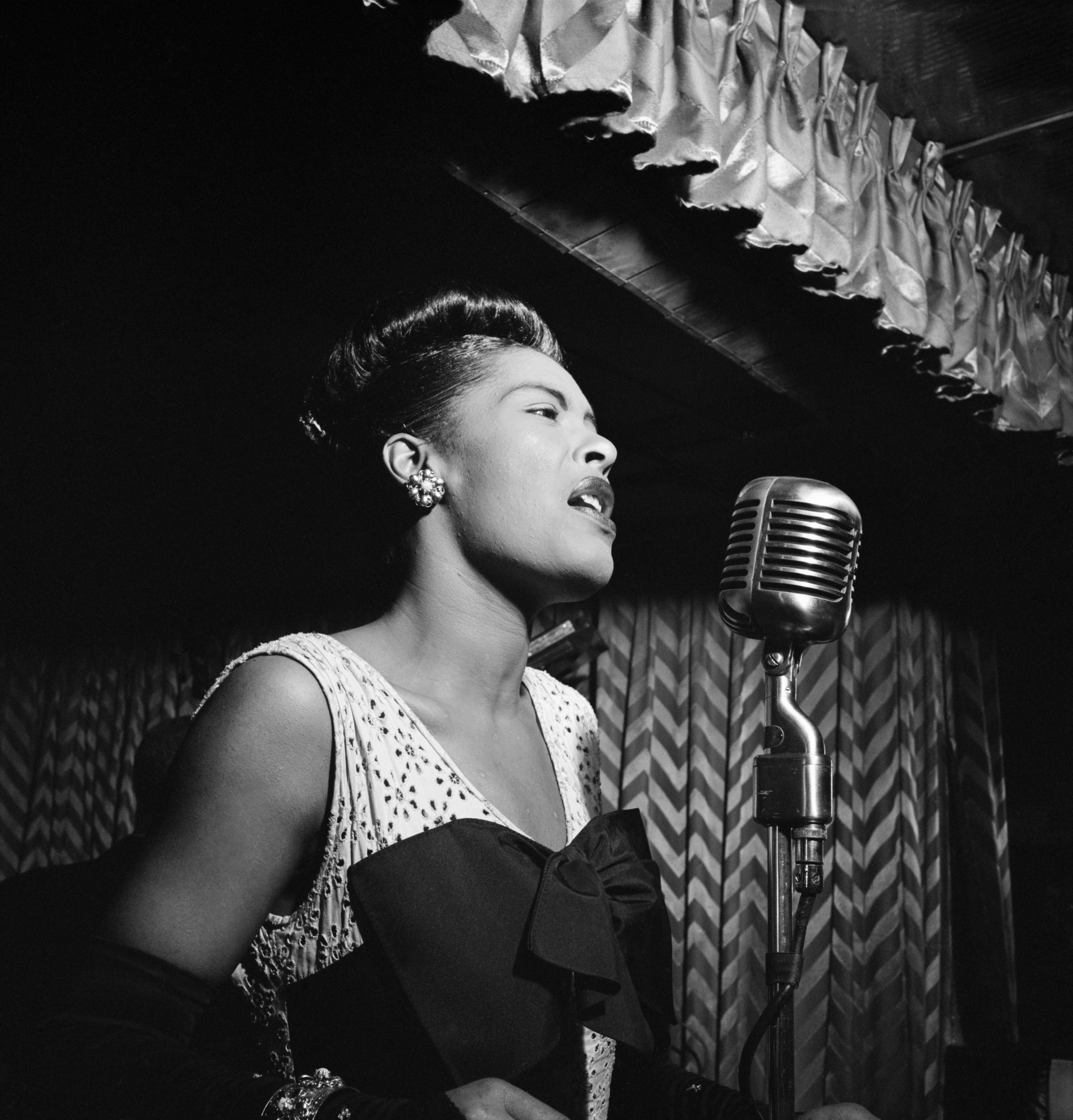
- Photo from Down Beat magazine, c. February 1947
- Studio albums: 12
- Live albums: 3
- Compilation albums: 24
- Singles: 38
- Box sets: 6

The discography of Billie Holiday, an American jazz singer, consists of 12 studio albums, three live albums, 24 compilations, six box sets, and 38 singles.

Holiday recorded extensively for six labels: Columbia Records (on its subsidiary labels Brunswick Records, Vocalion Records, and Okeh Records), from 1933 through 1942; Commodore Records in 1939 and 1944; Decca Records from 1944 through 1950; briefly for Aladdin Records in 1951; Verve Records and its earlier imprint Clef Records, from 1952 through 1957; again for Columbia Records from 1957 to 1958 and MGM Records in 1959. Many of Holiday's recordings were released on 78-rpm records, before the advent of long-playing vinyl records, and only Clef, Verve, and Columbia issued Holiday albums during her lifetime that were not compilations of previously released material. Many compilations have been issued since her death, including comprehensive box sets and live recordings.

In 1986, Joel Whitburn's company Record Research compiled information on the popularity of recordings released from the era predating rock and roll and created pop charts dating back to the beginning of the commercial recording industry. The company's findings were published in the book Pop Memories 1890–1954. Several of Holiday's records are listed on the pop charts Whitburn created.

Holiday began her recording career on a high note with her first major release, "Riffin' the Scotch", of which 5,000 copies were sold. It was released under the name "Benny Goodman & His Orchestra" in 1933.

Most of Holiday's early successes were released under the name "Teddy Wilson & His Orchestra". During her stay in Wilson's band, Holiday would sing a few bars and then other musicians would have a solo. Wilson, one of the most influential jazz pianists of the swing era, accompanied Holiday more than any other musician. He and Holiday issued 95 recordings together.

In July 1936, Holiday began releasing sides under her own name. These songs were released under the band name "Billie Holiday & Her Orchestra". Most noteworthy, the popular jazz standard "Summertime" sold well and was listed on the pop charts of the time at number 12, the first time the jazz standard charted. Only Billy Stewart's R&B version of "Summertime" reached a higher chart placement than Holiday's, charting at number 10 thirty years later in 1966.

Holiday had 16 best-selling songs in 1937, making the year her most commercially successful. It was in this year that Holiday scored her sole number one hit as a featured vocalist on the available pop charts of the 1930s, "Carelessly". The hit "I've Got My Love to Keep Me Warm", was also recorded by Ray Noble, Glen Gray, and Fred Astaire, whose rendering was a bestseller for weeks. Holiday's version ranked 6 on the year-end single chart available for 1937.

In 1939, Holiday recorded her biggest selling record, "Strange Fruit" for Commodore, charting at number 16 on the available pop chart for the 1930s.

In 1940, Billboard began publishing its modern pop charts, which included the Best Selling Retail Records chart, the precursor to the Hot 100. None of Holiday's songs placed on the modern pop charts, partly because Billboard only published the first ten slots of the charts in some issues. Minor hits and independent releases had no way of being spotlighted.

"God Bless the Child", which went on to sell over a million copies, ranked number 3 on Billboard's year-end top songs of 1941.

On October 24, 1942, Billboard began issuing its R&B charts. Two of Holiday's songs placed on the chart, "Trav'lin' Light" with Paul Whiteman, which topped the chart, and "Lover Man", which reached number 5. "Trav'lin' Light" also reached 18 on Billboard's year-end chart.

== Studio albums ==
=== Clef Records and Verve Records, 1952–1958 ===
Year	Album details
1952	Billie Holiday Sings: Released: 1952; Recorded: March 26, 1952; Label: Clef Records; Clef MGC 118 (10" LP); Mercury 89002 (four 78-rpm records)
1953	An Evening with Billie Holiday: Released: 1953; Recorded: April 1, 1952; July 27, 1952; Label: Clef Records; Clef MGC 144 (10-inch LP); Mercury 89028 (four 78 rpm records)
1954	Billie Holiday: Released: 1954; Recorded: April 1, 1952; April 14, 1954; Label: Clef Records; Clef MGC 161 (10-inch LP); Mercury 89045 (four 78 rpm records)
1955	Music for Torching with Billie Holiday: Released: October 1955; Recorded: August 23 and 25, 1955; Label: Clef Records; Clef MGC 669 / Verve MV 2595; Format: LP
1956	Velvet Mood: Released: 1956; Recorded: August 23 and 25, 1955; Label: Clef Records; Clef MGC 713; Format: LP
1956	Lady Sings the Blues: Released: 1956; Recorded: June 6 and 7, 1956; September 3, 1954; Label: Clef Records; Clef MGC 721, Verve MV 2047; Format: LP
1957	Body and Soul: Released: 1957; Recorded: January 3, 4, 7, and 9, 1957; Label: Verve Records; Verve MGV 8197; Format: LP
1957	Songs for Distingué Lovers: Released: 1957; Recorded: January 3, 4, 7, and 8, 1957; Label: Verve Records; Verve MGV 8257, Verve 2352 085; Format: LP
1958	Stay with Me: Released: 1958; Recorded: February 14, 1955; Label: Verve Records; Verve MGV 8302; Format: LP
1958	All or Nothing at All: Released: 1958; Recorded: August 14 and 18, 1956; January 3, 7, and 8, 1957; Label: Verve Records; Verve MGV 8329; Format: LP

=== Columbia Records and MGM Records, 1958–1959 ===
List of albums, with selected chart positions
Title	Album details	Peak chart positions
Title	Album details	UK Jazz & Blues
Lady in Satin	Released: June 1958; Recorded: February 19–21, 1958; Label: Columbia (CL 1157); Format: LP	11
Last Recording	Released: July 1959; Recorded: March 3, 4, and 11, 1959; Label: MGM (3764); Format: LP	—

== 7" EPs ==
Year	Album details	Peak chart positions	Notes
Year	Album details	US	Notes
1953	Billie Holiday Vol. 1: Label: Decca (ED 2031); Format: 7" EP (45 rpm)	—	
1954?	A Collection of Classic Jazz Interpretations by Billie Holiday: Label: Columbia (B-1949); Format: 7" EP (45 rpm)	—	
1954	Billie Holiday: Label: Columbia (B-2534); Format: 7" EP (45 rpm)	—	
1955	Billie Holiday and Teddy Wilson: Label: Columbia (ESDF 1038, France); Format: 7" EP (45 rpm)	—	with Teddy Wilson; also released as Body and Soul

== Live albums ==
Title	Album details	Notes
Billie Holiday at Jazz at the Philharmonic	Released: 1954; Recorded: February 12, 1945; June 3 and October 7, 1946; Label: Clef Records; Clef MG C-169 (10-inch LP); Mercury 89053 (four 78 rpm records)	
Ella Fitzgerald and Billie Holiday at Newport	Released: 1958; Recorded: July 4–6, 1957; Label: Verve Records (MG V-8234); Format: LP	
The Essential Billie Holiday: Carnegie Hall Concert Recorded Live	Released: 1961; Recorded: November 10, 1956; Label: Verve Records (MG V6-8410); Format: LP	
Ladylove	Released: 1962; Recorded: January–February 1954; Label: United Artists Records; Format: LP	Live in Germany
A Rare Live Recording of Billie Holiday	Released: 1964; Recorded: October 28 and November 1, 1951; Label: Recording Industries M2001; Format: LP	Live at Storyville Club, Boston
Count Basie, At the Savoy Ballroom 1937	Released: 1971; Recorded: 1937; Label: SagaPan PAN 6903; Format: LP	Holiday sings two songs, with Basie's band
At Monterey / 1958	Released: 1986; Recorded: 1958; Label: BlackHawk (50701); Format: CD	
A Midsummer Night's Jazz at Stratford '57	Released: 1999; Recorded: 1957; Label: Baldwin Street (308); Format: CD	

== Compilation albums ==
Most of Holiday's albums prior to 1952 were made up of material previously released as singles.

=== 78 RPM albums ===
List of compilation albums released in the 1940s
Title	Album details
Billie Holiday	Released: 1946; Label: Commodore (CR-2), Universal Music Classic (UCCU-5760); Format: 78 rpm records, CD
Fancy Free	Released: 1946; Label: Decca (DA-406); Format: 78 rpm records
Teddy Wilson–Billie Holiday, Hot Jazz Classics	Released: 1947; Label: Columbia (C-61); Format: 78 rpm records
A Hot Jazz Classic Set, Vol. 1	Released: 1947; Label: Columbia (C-135); Format: 78 rpm records
Distinctive Song Stylings	Released: 1947; Label: Decca (A-652); Format: 78 rpm records

=== 10" LPs ===
Title	Album details	Notes
Teddy Wilson and His Orchestra Featuring Billie Holiday	Released: 1949; Label: Columbia (CL 6040); Format: 10-inch LP	
Billie Holiday Sings	Released: 1950; Label: Columbia (CL 6129); Format: 10-inch LP	
Volume One	Released: 1950; Label: Commodore (20005); Format: 10-inch LP	
Volume Two	Released: 1950; Label: Commodore (20006); Format: 10-inch LP	
Favorites	Released: 1951; Label: Columbia (CL 6163); Format: 10-inch LP	
Lover Man	Released: 1951; Label: Decca (DL 5345); Format: 10-inch LP	
Billie Holiday and Teddy Wilson Orchestras	Released: 1954; Label: Columbia (33 S 1034); Format: 10-inch LP	
Billie Holiday Volume One	Released: 1954; Label: Jolly Roger (5020); Format: 10-inch LP	
Billie Holiday Volume Two	Released: 1954; Label: Jolly Roger (5021); Format: 10-inch LP	
Billie Holiday Volume Three	Released: 1954; Label: Jolly Roger (5022); Format: 10-inch LP	
Ella, Lena and Billie	Released: 1955; Label: Columbia (CL 2531); Format: 10-inch LP	VA compilation; appears on 2 tracks

=== 12" LPs ===
Title	Album details	Peak chart positions	Notes
Title	Album details	US Jazz	Notes
Lady Day	Released: 1954; Label: Columbia (CL 637); Format: LP	—	
I Like Jazz!	Released: 1955; Label: Columbia (JZ 1); Format: LP	—	VA compilation; appears on one track
Recital by Billie Holiday	Released: 1956; Label: Clef (MG C-686); Format: LP	—	compiles the Clef 10"s An Evening with Billie Holiday (MG C-144, 1953) and Billie Holiday (1454, MG C-161)
Solitude	Released: 1956; Label: Clef (MG C-690), Verve (1957 reissue; MGV 8074); Format: LP	—	compiles the Clef 10"s Billie Holiday Sings (MG C-118, 1952) An Evening with Billie Holiday (MG C-144, 1953) and Billie Holiday (1454, MG C-161)
Jazz Recital	Released: 1956; Label: Clef (MG C-718); Format: LP	—	split with Ralph Burns; appears on Side 1; partial reissue of Billie Holiday at JATP
The Lady Sings	Released: 1956; Label: Decca (DL 8215); Format: LP	—	
The Unforgettable Lady Day	Released: 1957; Label: Verve (V 8338-2); Format: 2×LP	—	
The Blues Are Brewin'	Released: 1958; Label: Decca (DL 8701); Format: LP	—	
Lover Man	Released: 1958; Label: Decca (DL 8702); Format: LP	—	
Billie Holiday	Released: 1958; Label: Commodore (30008); Format: LP	—	
The Sound of Jazz	Released: 1958; Label: Columbia (CL 1098); Format: LP	—	VA compilation; appears on one track
Seven Ages of Jazz	Released: 1959; Label: MetroJazz (1009); Format: LP	—	VA compilation; appears on two tracks
An Evening with Eddie Heywood and Billie Holiday	Released: 1959; Label: Commodore (FL 30001); Format: LP	—	
The Billie Holiday Story	Released: 1959 (Canada), 1972 (US); Label: Decca (DXB-161); Format: LP	85	
Billie Holiday's Greatest Hits	Released: 1967; Label: Columbia (CL 2666); Format: LP		
Strange Fruit	Released: 1972; Label: Atlantic (SD 1614); Format: LP	108	
The Original Recordings	Released: 1973; Label: Columbia (C 32060); Format: LP	135	

=== CDs ===
Title	Album details	Peak chart positions			Notes
Title	Album details	US Jazz	UK	UK Jazz & Blues	Notes
The Legend of Billie Holiday	Released: 1985; Label: MCA (BHTV1); Format: LP, CD, cassette	60		7	BPI: Gold
Billie's Best	Released: 1992; Label: Verve (P2-13943); Format: CD	29	—	—	best of the
16 Most Requested Songs	Released: 1993; Label: Columbia, Legacy (CK 53776); Format: CD	—	—	—	
The Essential Recordings	Released: 1993; Label: Music Club (MCCD 095); Format: CD, cassette	—	—	22	BPI: Silver
Billie's Blues	Released: 1995; Label: Rolled Gold (RGCD1054); Format: CD	—	—	6	
Love Me or Leave Me	Released: 1995; Label: Hallmark (302412); Format: CD	—	—	9	
The Gold Collection: 40 Classic Performances	Released: 1995; Label: Dejavu Retro (R2CD 40-06); Format: CD	—	—	19	
40 Great Songs	Released: 1996; Label: Musketeer (MUCD9507); Format: CD	—	—	7	
Love Songs	Released: 1996; Label: Columbia, Legacy (CK 64853); Format: CD, cassette	23	—	23	
Lady Day – The Very Best Of	Released: 1997; Label: Columbia (MOODCD52); Format: CD, cassette, minidisc	—	63	1	
A Portrait of Billie Holiday	Released: 1997; Label: Gallerie (GALE 409); Format: CD	—	—	7	
Greatest Hits	Released: 1998; Label: Columbia (CK 65757); Format: CD	—	—	28	
Fine and Mellow – The Best of Billie Holiday	Released: 1999; Label: Columbia (494640 2); Format: CD	—	—	9	
The Very Best of Billie Holiday	Released: 1999; Label: Verve (547 494-2); Format: CD	—	—	1	
Ken Burns Jazz: The Definitive Billie Holiday	Released: 2001; Label: Verve (P2 49081); Format: CD	174	5	—	
Billie Holiday	Released: 2001; Label: Direct Source Special Products Inc. (PST 14572); Format: CD	—	47	—	
Stormy Weather	Released: 2001; Label: Black Box (BB242); Format: CD	—	—	9	
Holiday Blues	Released: 2001; Label: Planet Media (PML 1078); Format: CD	—	—	13	
Lady Day Swings	Released: 2002; Label: Columbia/Legacy (COL 508608 2); Format: CD	—	—	—	
Lady Day: The Best of Billie Holiday	Released: 2002; Label: Columbia/Legacy (C2K 85979); Format: CD	—	25	—	
The Best of Billie Holiday	Released: 2002; Label: Hip-O, Verve (B0007788-02); Format: CD	—	19	—	
Holiday for Lovers	Released: 2002; Label: Verve (314 589 932-2); Format: CD	—	37	—	
The Jazz Biography	Released: 2004; Label: United Audio Entertainment (TJB 55092); Format: CD	—	41	—	
Summertime – The Very Best of Billie Holiday	Released: 2005; Label: UCJ (983111-3); Format: CD	—	—	3	
Sings Her Favorite Blues Songs	Released: 2006; Label: Disky (SI 903623); Format: CD	—	—	12	
The Essential Hits	Released: 2006; Label: Spectrum (9813493); Format: CD	—	—	14	
The Silver Collection	Released: 2007; Label: Spectrum (9846639)	—	—	21	
The Great American Songbook	Released: 2007; Label: Not Now Music (NOT2CD220)	—	—	11	
Super Hits	Released: 2008; Label: Sony (A 727899); Format: CD	—	43	—	
The Worth It Collection	Released: 2008; Label: Spectrum (WITUNI22)	—	—	9	
The Complete Billie Holiday	Released: 2009; Label: X5; Format: Digital download	122	1	—	
Icon: Love Songs	Released: 2011; Label: Verve, Decca (B0015105-02); Format: CD	25		—	
The Real... Billie Holiday (The Ultimate Collection)	Released: 2011; Label: Columbia, Sony (88691900762); Format: CD	—		16	
101: Billie Holiday The Best Of	Released: 2013; Label: Ap; Format: Digital download, Online streaming	45		—	
The Centennial Collection	Released: 2015; Label: Columbia, Legacy (88875048762); Format: CD	8		30	
88 Hits	Released: 2015; Label: 99 Music (3661318036883)	—		5	
60 Essential Recordings	Released: 2018; Label: Big3 (BT3192); Format: CD	—		2	

== Box sets ==
List of box sets, with selected chart positions
Title	Album details	Peak chart positions	
Title	Album details	US Jazz	UK Jazz & Blues
Billie Holiday on Verve 1946–1959	Released: 1985; Label: Polydor Japan (00MJ 3480/9); Format: 10 LPs with 134 monaural tracks, including four previously unreleased takes	—	—
Rare/Unissued Recordings From Her Transitional Years	Released: 1991; Label: Bellaphon (62550002/3/6/7); Format: 4×CD	—	—
The Complete Billie Holiday on Verve 1945–1959	Released: 1992; Label: Verve (314 513 859-2); Format: 10 CDs, 256 tracks	—	—
Lady Day: The Complete Billie Holiday on Columbia 1933–1944	Released: 2001; Label: Columbia, Legacy (CXK 85470); Format: 10 CDs, 230 tracks	—	—
The Ultimate Collection	Released: 2005; Label: Verve, Decca, Hip-O (B0003918-00); Format: 2×CD, 1 DVD	33	—
The Complete Verve Studio Master Takes	Released: 2005; Label: Columbia, Legacy (CXK 85470); Format: 6 CDs, 100 tracks, recorded 1952–1959, 24-bit digital remastering, limited edition	—	—
The Essential Collection	Released: 2005; Label: Rolled Gold (RGTCD5016); Format: 2×CD	—	10
That Old Devil Called Love	Released: 2006; Label: Ground Floor (GRFL010); Format: 2×CD	—	12
Lady Day: The Master Takes and Singles	Released: 2007; Label: Columbia (88697); Format: 4 CDs, 80 tracks	22	—
The Complete Commodore & Decca Masters	Released: 2009; Label: Hip-O Select (BC013146-02); Format: 3 CDs, 49 remastered tracks	—	—
Her Finest Studio Recordings	Released: 2009; Label: Big3 (BT 3007); Format: 3×CD	—	26
100 Hits Legends: Billie Holiday	Released: July 5, 2010; Label: Demon (LEGENDS 017); Format: 5×CD	—	2
The Complete Decca Recordings	Released: 2022; Label: Verve, Decca ( B0036066-01); Format: 4×LP	17	—

== Remix albums ==
List of remix albums, with selected chart positions
Title	Album details	Peak chart positions	
Title	Album details	US Dance/ Electr.	US Jazz
Remixed & Reimagined	Released: Aug 7, 2007; Label: Columbia, Legacy (82876 85088 2); Format: LP, CD	3	5

== Singles ==
List of singles, with selected chart positions, showing year released
Title	Year	Peak chart positions	
Title	Year	US Pop	US R&B
"Riffin' the Scotch"	1934	6	—
"What a Little Moonlight Can Do"	1935	12	—
"Twenty-Four Hours a Day"	1935	6	—
"If You Were Mine"	1935	12	—
"You Let Me Down"	1936	18	—
"These Foolish Things (Remind Me of You)"	1936	5	—
"It's Like Reaching for the Moon"	1936	17	—
"No Regrets"	1936	9	—
"Summertime"	1936	12	—
"A Fine Romance"	1936	9	—
"Let's Call a Heart a Heart"	1936	18	—
"The Way You Look Tonight"	1936	3	—
"Who Loves You?"	1936	4	—
"That's Life, I Guess"	1936	20	—
"I Can't Give You Anything but Love (Dear)"	1936	5	—
"Pennies from Heaven"	1937	3	—
"I've Got My Love to Keep Me Warm"	1937	4	—
"Please Keep Me in Your Dreams"	1937	13	—
"This Year's Kisses"	1937	8	—
"Carelessly"	1937	1	—
"How Could You"	1937	12	—
"Moanin' Low"	1937	11	—
"They Can't Take That Away from Me"	1937	12	—
"Mean to Me"	1937	7	—
"Easy Living"	1937	15	—
"Yours & Mine"	1937	16	—
"Me, Myself, and I"	1937	11	—
"A Sailboat in the Moonlight"	1937	10	—
"Getting Some Fun Out of Life"	1937	10	—
"Trav'lin' All Alone"	1937	18	—
"Nice Work If You Can Get It"	1937	14	—
"My Man"	1938	12	—
"You Go to My Head"	1938	20	—
"I'm Gonna Lock My Heart"	1938	2	—
"Strange Fruit"	1939	16	—
"God Bless the Child"	1941	25	—
"Trav'lin' Light"	1942	23	1
"Lover Man (Oh, Where Can You Be?)"	1945	16	5
"Don't Explain"	1946	—	—

== Compositions ==
- 1936: "Billie's Blues" (also known as "I Love My Man")
- 1939: "Our Love Is Different"
- 1939: "Long Gone Blues"
- 1939: "Fine and Mellow"
- 1939: "Everything Happens for the Best"
- 1940: "Tell Me More and More and Then Some"
- 1941: "God Bless the Child"
- 1944: "Don't Explain"
- 1949: "Somebody's on My Mind"
- 1949: "Now or Never"
- 1954: "Stormy Blues"
- 1956: "Lady Sings the Blues"

Never recorded

- 1939: "Lost at the Crossroads of Love"
- 1940: "Say I'm Yours Again"
- 1949: "Close Dem Eyes My Darlin'"
- 1952: "Please Don't Do It in Here"
- 1952: "You'd Do It Anyway"
- 1955: "Preacher Boy"
- 1957: "Left Alone"
- 1957: "Who Needs You (Baby)"
