= Stolen Moments: The Lady Sings... Jazz and Blues =

Live album by Diana Ross
- Released: April 1993: March 19, 2002 (Remastered edition)
- Recorded: December 4, 1992
- Genre: R&B/Soul/Jazz
- Length: 73:13
- Label: Motown

Diana Ross chronology
The Force Behind the Power (1991)	Stolen Moments: The Lady Sings... Jazz and Blues (1993)	Forever Diana: Musical Memoirs (1993)

Professional ratings
Review scores
Source	Rating
AllMusic	3/5 stars
Music Week	3/5 stars

Stolen Moments: The Lady Sings... Jazz and Blues is a 1993 live album by Diana Ross released on the Motown label.

The album was recorded at the 975-seat Walter Kerr Theatre in New York City on December 4, 1992. The nineteen Jazz standards, which are strongly associated with the late Billie Holiday, had been sung by the Motown singer twenty years before for the Lady Sings the Blues soundtrack.

The band backing Ross includes jazz giants Roy Hargrove, Ron Carter, Jon Faddis, and Urbie Greene, among others. Upon release, the album reached the Top 10 on Billboard's jazz chart, peaking at number two.

A 90-minute video recording of the show was released, initially as a Pay-Per-View event in the United States, and then in the various video formats available at the time. The video recording featured a performance by Rhonda Ross and behind-the-scenes footage with Diana.

A studio recording of the new song "Where Did We Go Wrong", co-written by Ross, was included on international editions of the album, but these international releases omitted the live track "The Man I Love".

The original airing in 1992 celebrated the 20th Anniversary of the release of Ross's film debut in Lady Sings the Blues.

The album CD and DVD were both remastered and re-released in 2002.

This is the second of three jazz albums that Ross has recorded including "Lady Sings the Blues" and "Blue". All albums lead back to "Lady Sings the Blues". The soundtrack hit the summit (#1) on the Jazz album chart, while both "Stolen Moments" and "Blue" peaked at #2. Along with their commercial success, they were all critically acclaimed.

== Track listing ==
1. "Fine and Mellow" (Billie Holiday) - 2:58
2. "Them There Eyes" (Pinkard, Tauber, Tracey) - 3:42
3. "Don't Explain" (Arthur Herzog Jr., Holiday) - 4:48
4. "What a Little Moonlight Can Do" (Woods) - 3:46
5. "Mean to Me" (Fred E. Ahlert, Roy Turk) - 2:41
6. "Lover Man" (Davis, Ramirez, Sherman) - 5:01
7. "Gimme a Pigfoot (And a Bottle of Beer)" (Coot Grant / Wesley Wilson) - 3:31
8. "Little Girl Blue" (Lorenz Hart, Richard Rodgers) - 3:21
9. "There's a Small Hotel" (Lorenz Hart, Richard Rodgers) - 2:47
10. "I Cried for You" (Gus Arnheim, Abe Lyman, Arthur Freed) - 6:38
11. "The Man I Love" (George Gershwin, Ira Gershwin) - 5:13
12. "God Bless the Child" (Herzog, Holiday) - 6:13
13. "Love Is Here to Stay" (George Gershwin, Ira Gershwin) - 2:18
14. "You've Changed" (Carl Fischer, Bill Carey) - 2:59
15. "Strange Fruit" (Lewis Allan) - 3:31
16. "Good Morning Heartache" (Ervin Drake, Dan Fisher, Irene Higginbotham) - 5:02
17. "Ain't Nobody's Business If I Do" (Porter Grainger, Everett Robbins) - 2:44
18. "My Man" (Maurice Yvain, André Willemetz, Jacques Charles, Channing Pollock (writer)) - 3:54
19. "Fine and Mellow (Reprise)" (Holiday) - 2:06

== Charts ==
Chart (1993)	Peak position
Australian Albums (ARIA)	141
UK Albums (OCC)	45
US Top Jazz Albums (Billboard)	30
US Top R&B/Hip-Hop Albums (Billboard)	73
US Top Traditional Jazz Albums (Billboard)	10
