= Lady in Autumn: The Best of the Verve Years =

Greatest hits album by Billie Holiday
- Released: 1991
- Recorded: April 1946–March 1959
- Length: 127:42
- Label: Verve Records

Professional ratings
Review scores
Source	Rating
AllMusic	4.5/5 stars
The Encyclopedia of Popular Music	5/5 stars
The Penguin Guide to Jazz Recordings	3.5/4 stars
The Rolling Stone Album Guide	4.5/5 stars

Lady in Autumn: The Best of The Verve Years is a compilation album by the singer Billie Holiday.

== Critical reception ==
The Rolling Stone Album Guide called the album "a bittersweet triumph."

In 2000, it was voted number 527 in Colin Larkin's All Time Top 1000 Albums.

== Track listing ==
=== Disc One ===
1. "Body and Soul" – 3:25
2. "Strange Fruit" – 2:57
3. "Trav'lin' Light" – 3:27
4. "All of Me" – 2:01
5. "(There Is) No Greater Love" – 2:37
6. "I Cover the Waterfront" – 2:52
7. "These Foolish Things" – 3:34
8. "Tenderly" – 3:21
9. "Autumn in New York" – 3:52
10. "My Man" – 2:37
11. "Stormy Weather" – 3:39
12. "Yesterdays" – 2:47
13. "(I Got a Man, Crazy for Me) He's Funny That Way" – 3:09
14. "What a Little Moonlight Can Do" – 3:11
15. "I Cried for You (Now It's Your Turn to Cry Over Me)" – 2:27
16. "Too Marvelous for Words" – 2:12
17. "I Wished on the Moon" – 6:44
18. "I Don't Want to Cry Anymore" – 3:54
19. "Prelude to a Kiss" – 5:35
20. "Nice Work If You Can Get It" – 3:50

=== Disc Two ===
1. "Come Rain or Come Shine" – 4:20
2. "What's New?" – 4:16
3. "God Bless the Child" – 3:58
4. "Do Nothin' Till You Hear from Me" – 4:13
5. "April in Paris" – 3:01
6. "Lady Sings the Blues" – 2:39
7. "Don't Explain" – 2:25
8. "Fine and Mellow" [live] – 3:21
9. "I Didn't Know What Time It Was" – 5:58
10. "Stars Fell on Alabama" – 4:27
11. "One for My Baby (And One More for the Road)" – 5:38
12. "Gee Baby, Ain't I Good to You" - 5:36
13. "Lover Man" – 3:08
14. "All the Way" – 3:22
15. "Don't Worry 'Bout Me" – 3:09
