= Wives and Lovers (Jack Jones album) =

Studio album by Jack Jones
- Released: December 1963
- Genre: Traditional pop; Early Pop; Easy Listening; Vocal Jazz
- Length: 35:25
- Label: Kapp Records; KL 1352 (M); KS 3352 (S)
- Producer: Michael Kapp

Jack Jones chronology
Call Me Irresponsible (1963)	Wives and Lovers (1963)	Bewitched (1964)

Singles from Wives and Lovers
- 1. "Wives and Lovers" Released: November 1963

Wives and Lovers is the seventh studio album by American singer Jack Jones, released in December 1963 by Kapp Records. The album was met with a mostly positive critical reception, and also reached high positions on the charts.

== Background and content ==
Jack Jones, who had received his first hit and Grammy award winner in 1962 with "Lollipops and Roses" had released a top 20 pop hit in 1963 titled "Wives and Lovers", was at his peak popularity. Riding high on the success Jones would record a same-named album produced by Micheal Kapp himself. Arrangers would include Marty Paich and Ralph Carmichael. The album included covers of old standards like "Come Rain or Come Shine", "Nina Never Knew", and "I Wish You Love", but contained newies like "Toys in the Attic" and "Charade", both from their respective same-named films.

== Reception ==
Professional ratings
Review scores
Source	Rating
AllMusic	3.5/5 stars
The Encyclopedia of Popular Music	4/5 stars
Record Mirror	4/5 stars

=== Contemporary reception ===
Wives and Lovers was given a positive critical response following its release. Variety notes "Jones puts his smooth, lyrical style to good use on numbers which are arranged by Pete King, Glenn Osser, Marty Patch, and Ralph Carmicheal." Billboard magazine named the album among its "Pop Spotlight" LPs in late December 1963 and said that "Jack Jones continues to build as an artist", continuing "'Wives and Lovers is included here, along with some slick items like 'Toys in the Attic,' 'Angel Eyes,' 'Fly Me to the Moon' and a neat teaming with pianist Roger Williams on the new movie theme, "Charade." Concluding that the album is a "Strong wax and the last named item could get much play." Cashbox noted that Jones "follows his best-selling 'Call Me Irresponsible' LP with this new package on Kapp tagged after his click single, 'Wives And Lovers.'" The magazine said that the album has a "dozen warm and feelingful readings of such goodies as 'Wives and Lovers,' 'I Wish You Love' and a powerful survey of 'Charade'". Record Mirror believed Jones "should be the next biggest to breakthrough here in the ballad field," and said that "This is classy song-selling."

=== Retrospective reviews ===
Retrospectives were also positive. Jason Ankeny on AllMusic stated, "The LP boasts an old-guard charm, recruiting arrangers including Marty Paich and Ralph Carmichael to create a delightful collection of string-sweetened, jazz-influenced ballads perfectly attuned to Jones' rich, crystalline vocals." Adding "An unusually clever interpreter, Jones approaches standards like 'Fly Me to the Moon' and 'Come Rain or Come Shine' with intelligence and class, never succumbing to pathos." It was given a four-star rating by The Encyclopedia of Popular Music as well, which meant that the album was classified as "outstanding".

== Chart performance ==
Immediately after being released, Wives and Lovers was reported getting strong sales action by dealers in major markets. The album debuted on the Billboard Top LPs chart in the issue dated December 28, 1963, and remained on the chart for 53 weeks, peaking at number 18. It debuted on the Cashbox Top 100 Albums chart in the issue dated December 14, 1963, and remained on the chart for a total of 35 weeks, peaking at number 15. On the magazine's Top 50 Stereo chart it peaked at number 17.

The album's title track debuted on the Billboard Hot 100 in the issue dated November 2, 1963, peaking at number 14 during a 14-week run, his highest single chart. and debuted on the magazine's Easy Listening chart November 23, peaking at number nine during a 11-week run. The track debuted on the Cashbox singles chart in the issue dated November 2, 1963, peaking at number 12 during an 15-week run.

== Track listing ==
=== Side one ===
No.	Title	Writer(s)	Length
1.	"Wives and Lovers"	Burt Bacharach, Hal David	2:29
2.	"Toys in the Attic" (from the U.A. release: Toys in the Attic)	George Duning, George David Weiss, Joe Sherman	2:52
3.	"Songs About Love"	Al Stillman, Henry Mancini	2:26
4.	"I'm Moody"	Jack Fulton, Matt Dennis	2:43
5.	"Angel Eyes"	Earl K. Brent, Matt Dennis	2:54
6.	"Fly Me To The Moon (In Other Words)"	Bart Howard	2:58

=== Side two ===
No.	Title	Writer(s)	Length
1.	"Charade" (from the Universal Pictures film: Charade)	Henry Mancini, Johnny Mercer	3:14
2.	"I Wish You Love"	Albert A. Beach, Charles Trenet	4:04
3.	"Nina Never Knew"	Louis Alter, Milton Drake	3:04
4.	"Summertime Promises"	Sammy Cahn, Jimmy Van Heusen	2:35
5.	"I See Your Face Before Me" (from the Broadway musical: Between the Devil)	Howard Dietz, Arthur Schwartz	3:13
6.	"Come Rain or Come Shine" (from the Broadway musical: St. Louis Woman)	Harold Arlen, Johnny Mercer	2:40

== Charts ==
Chart peaks for Wives and Lovers
Chart (1963–1964)	Peak position
US Billboard Top LPs	18
US Cashbox Top 100 Albums	14
US Cashbox Top 50 Stereo	17

== Release history ==
Release history and formats for Wives and Lovers
Region	Date	Format	Label	Ref.
United States	December 1963	LP; Vinyl	Kapp Records	
United States	January 1969	8-track cartridge tape	Kapp Records	
United Kingdom	July 1964	LP; Vinyl	London Records	
Worldwide	Circa 2020	Music download; streaming	Geffen Records	
