= Billie Holiday Sings =

1952 studio album by Billie Holiday

Studio album by Billie Holiday
- Released: 1952
- Recorded: March 26, 1952
- Studios: Radio Recorders, Los Angeles, California
- Genre: Vocal jazz
- Length: 25:57
- Labels: Mercury; Clef
- Producer: Norman Granz

Billie Holiday chronology
Billie Holiday Sings (1952)	An Evening with Billie Holiday (1953)

Professional ratings
Review scores
Source	Rating
AllMusic	4.5/5 stars
DownBeat	5/5 stars
The Encyclopedia of Popular Music	3/5 stars

Solitude

Studio album by Billie Holiday
- Released: 1956
- Recorded: March 26, 1952, and April 1952
- Studios: Radio Recorders, Los Angeles, California
- Genre: Vocal jazz
- Length: 38:57
- Label: Clef
- Producer: Norman Granz

Professional ratings
Review scores
Source	Rating
AllMusic	3/5 stars
The Encyclopedia of Popular Music	3/5 stars
The Penguin Guide to Jazz Recordings	3.5/4 stars

Billie Holiday Sings (MGC-118) is the debut studio album by jazz singer Billie Holiday, released in the United States on Mercury Records in 1952 and on Clef Records in 1953. It was her first album for Clef, and her first album of original material, following several compilations of previously released 78-rpm sides on the Columbia, Commodore, and Decca record labels.

In 1956, when the 10-inch format was phased out, the album was reissued by Clef Records as Solitude (MG C-690), with four extra tracks recorded at a second session sometime in April 1952 (exact date unknown), with the same musicians. The final track, "Tenderly", had been previously released on her second 10-inch LP, An Evening with Billie Holiday (MG C-144). The other three new songs had been previously released on her third 10-inch LP, simply titled Billie Holiday (MG C-161).

There is a compilation album with the same title, Billie Holiday Sings, released in 1950 by Columbia Records as a 10-inch LP (CL 6129). It includes old 78-rpm sides from the mid 1930s to the early 1940s, with Holiday accompanied by Lester Young, Teddy Wilson, Buck Clayton and Claude Thornhill among others.

== Track listing ==
=== 1952 10-inch LP, Billie Holiday Sings ===
A side

1. "I Only Have Eyes for You" (Al Dubin, Harry Warren) – 2:57
2. "You Turned the Tables on Me" (Louis Alter, Sidney D. Mitchell) – 3:29
3. "Blue Moon" (Richard Rodgers, Lorenz Hart) – 3:31
4. "(In My) Solitude" (Eddie DeLange, Duke Ellington, Irving Mills) – 3:31

B side

1. "These Foolish Things" (Harry Link, Holt Marvell, Jack Strachey) – 3:38
2. "(You'd Be So) Easy to Love" (Cole Porter) – 3:01
3. "You Go to My Head" (J. Fred Coots, Haven Gillespie) – 2:56
4. "East of the Sun (and West of the Moon)" (Brooks Bowman) – 2:54

=== 1956 12-inch LP, Solitude ===
A side

1. "East of the Sun (and West of the Moon)" (Brooks Bowman) – 2:54
2. "Blue Moon" (Richard Rodgers, Lorenz Hart) – 3:31
3. "You Go to My Head" (J. Fred Coots, Haven Gillespie) – 2:56
4. "You Turned the Tables on Me" (Louis Alter, Sidney D. Mitchell) – 3:29
5. "You'd Be So Easy to Love" (Cole Porter) – 3:01
6. "These Foolish Things" (Harry Link, Holt Marvell, Jack Strachey) – 3:38

B side

1. "I Only Have Eyes for You" (Al Dubin, Harry Warren) – 2:57
2. "(In My) Solitude" (Eddie DeLange, Duke Ellington, Irving Mills) – 3:31
3. "Everything I Have Is Yours" (Harold Adamson, Burton Lane) – 3:43
4. "Love for Sale" (Porter) – 2:56
5. "Moonglow" (Eddie DeLange, Will Hudson, Irving Mills) – 2:58
6. "Tenderly" (Walter Gross, Jack Lawrence) – 3:23

== Personnel ==
=== Performance ===
- Billie Holiday – vocals
- Charlie Shavers – trumpet
- Flip Phillips – tenor saxophone
- Oscar Peterson – piano
- Ray Brown – double bass
- Barney Kessel – guitar
- Alvin Stoller – drums

=== Production ===
- Norman Granz – producer
- David Stone Martin – artwork (Billie Holiday Sings)
- Alex de Paula – artwork (Solitude)
