= Lady Sings the Blues (soundtrack) =

1972 soundtrack album by Diana Ross

Soundtrack album by Diana Ross
- Released: October 1972
- Recorded: 1972
- Studios: MoWest (Los Angeles, California); Glen Glenn Sound (Hollywood, California)
- Genres: R&B; vocal jazz
- Length: 1:10:00
- Labels: Motown; M 758-D
- Producer: Gil Askey

Diana Ross chronology
| Surrender (1971) | Lady Sings the Blues (1972) | Greatest Hits (1972) |

Singles from Lady Sings the Blues
- 1. "Good Morning Heartache" Released: December 18, 1972

Lady Sings the Blues is the soundtrack to the Billie Holiday biopic of the same name, which starred Diana Ross in her 1972 screen debut. It became Ross' first number 1 album (eventually selling more than 2 million US copies), though the only one as a solo artist. It was certified gold in the UK for sales of more than 100,000 copies. It was the fourth best-selling R&B album and fifth best-selling Pop album of 1973 in the US.

Music writers said Ross emulated Billie Holiday's voice while retaining her own individual sound. This soundtrack album was the only Motown album to have a special designed label to match the album cover on the vinyl release, rather than Motown's usual "Map of Detroit" design. This label design would also turn up on the single releases from the soundtrack.

Professional ratings
Review scores
| Source | Rating |
|---|---|
| AllMusic | 3/5 stars |
| Christgau's Record Guide | B+ |

== Track listing ==
=== Side one ===
1. "The Arrest" – 0:15
2. "Lady Sings the Blues" – 1:03
3. "Baltimore Brothel" – 0:25
4. "Billie Sneaks into Dean and Dean's/Swinging Uptown" – 0:49
5. "'Taint Nobody's Bizness If I Do" – 1:06
6. "Big Ben/C.C. Rider" – 1:06
7. "All of Me" – 2:19
8. "The Man I Love" – 2:27
9. "Them There Eyes" – 1:03
10. "Gardenias from Louis" – 2:03
11. "Cafe Manhattan/Had You Been Around/Love Theme" – 2:03

=== Side two ===
1. "Any Happy Home" – 0:37
2. "I Cried for You" – 0:37
3. "Billie and Harry/Don't Explain" – 0:37
4. "Mean to Me" – 1:18
5. "Fine and Mellow" – 0:45
6. "What a Little Moonlight Can Do" – 2:09
7. "Louis Visits Billie on Tour/Love Theme" – 0:45
8. "Cafe Manhattan Party" – 1:37
9. "Persuasion/'Taint Nobody's Bizness If I Do" – 3:48
10. "Agent's Office" – 1:09
11. "Love Is Here to Stay" – 2:01

=== Side three ===
1. "Fine and Mellow" – 2:54
2. "Lover Man" – 3:22
3. "You've Changed" – 2:34
4. "Gimme a Pigfoot (And a Bottle of Beer)" – 2:06
5. "Good Morning Heartache" – 2:21
6. "All of Me" – 2:04

=== Side four ===
1. "Love Theme" – 2:53
2. "My Man" – 3:26
3. "Don't Explain" – 2:10
4. "I Cried for You" – 2:13
5. "Strange Fruit" – 3:35
6. "God Bless the Child" – 2:42
7. "Closing Theme" – 1:08

== Charts ==
=== Weekly charts ===
Weekly chart performance for Lady Sings the Blues
| Chart (1973) | Peak position |
|---|---|
| Australian Albums (Kent Music Report) | 43 |
| Canada Top Albums/CDs (RPM) | 5 |
| UK Albums (Official Charts) | 50 |
| US Billboard 200 | 1 |
| US Top R&B/Hip-Hop Albums (Billboard) | 2 |
| US Top 100 Albums (Cash Box) | 1 |
| US The Album Chart (Record World) | 1 |
| US The R&B LP Chart (Record World) | 1 |

=== Year-end charts ===
Year-end chart performance for Lady Sings the Blues
| Chart (1973) | Position |
|---|---|
| US Top Popular Albums (Billboard) | 5 |
| US Top Soul Albums (Billboard) | 4 |
| US Top 100 Albums (Cash Box) | 14 |
| US Top Soundtrack Albums (Cash Box) | 1 |
| US Top Album (Record World) | 5 |
| US Top Movie Soundtrack (Record World) | 1 |

== Certifications ==
| Region | Certification | Certified units/sales |
|---|---|---|
| United Kingdom (BPI) | Gold | 100,000^{^} |
^{^} Shipments figures based on certification alone.

== Personnel ==
- Diana Ross - vocals
- Gil Askey - conductor
- Gil Askey, Benny Golson, Oliver Nelson - arrangements
- Albert Aarons, William "Cat" Anderson, Bobby Bryant, Harry "Sweets" Edison, Teddy Buckner - trumpets
- Georgie Auld, William "Buddy" Collette, Plas Johnson, Jack Nimitz, Marshall Royal, Ernie Watts - saxophone
- George Bohanon, Jimmy Cleveland, Henry Coker, Grover Mitchell, Maurice Spears, John Ewing - trombones
- Max Bennett, George "Red" Callender, Arthur Edwards - bass
- John Collins - guitar, banjo
- Earl Palmer, Jesse Sailes - drums
- Don Abney, Gerald Wiggins, Chester Lane - piano
- "Caughey" Roberts - clarinet, soprano saxophone

== Production ==
- Michel Legrand - composed, arranged, conductor
- Guy Costa - engineering and technical direction
- Larry Miles, Cal Harris, Bill Macmeekin, Dave Ramsey, Art Stewart, Russ Terrana - Mowest engineers
- Gordon Day, Dave Docendort, John Norman - Glen Glen engineers
- Katarina Pettersson - art direction
- John Le Prevost, Frank Frezzo - design
- Orlando Suero - photography
- Sandra Forney - graphic production
- Suzanne de Passe, Iris Gordy - edited, coordinated
- Tony Jones - creative assistance
- Berry Gordy - executive producer

== See also ==
- "Happy (Love Theme from Lady Sings the Blues)" – Michael Jackson recording.
