= Stay with Me (Billie Holiday album) =

Studio album by Billie Holiday
- Released: 1958 (CD 1991)
- Recorded: February 14, 1955 (CD bonus tracks: April 14, 1954); Fine Sound Studios, New York
- Genre: Jazz
- Length: 33:47 (CD 42:27)
- Labels: Verve; MGV 8302 (511 523-2)
- Producer: Norman Granz

Billie Holiday chronology
Songs for Distingué Lovers (1957)	Stay with Me (1958)	All or Nothing at All (1958)

Stay with Me (MGV 8302) is the ninth studio album by jazz singer Billie Holiday, accompanied by Tony Scott and his Orchestra. It contains all the material from a session recorded on February 14, 1955, in New York City, and released in 1958 on producer Norman Granz's Verve label.

For the CD reissue in 1991 another session was appended, that Granz had previously issued as part of the self-titled Billie Holiday LP on his Clef record label (10-inch LP, Clef EPC 224/Verve MGC 690). The recording from April 14, 1954, at the same studio with "Billie Holliday and Her Band", consisted of the Oscar Peterson Trio, Ed Shaughnessy on drums, and trumpeter Charlie Shavers as the only members of both sessions beside Holiday. Beyond that, all tracks were part of many compilations and the complete recording issues of Billie Holiday.

== Reception ==
Professional ratings
Review scores
Source	Rating
AllMusic	4.5/5 stars
The Encyclopedia of Popular Music	3/5 stars

In a review for AllMusic, Ron Wynn stated that Holiday "was fading, but hadn't lost the dramatic quality in her delivery, nor her ability to project and tell a shattering story."

Jack Kenny, writing for Jazz Views, noted that the "readings that [Holiday] gives to popular tunes of her day can reveal depths that probably the writers of the lyrics never envisaged. There are numerous examples on this CD. The one that stands out is 'Love For Sale'... She sings it as though for the first time; you hear it as if for the first time. It was fortunate that Norman Granz managed to put her under contract in what proved to be her final years."

== Track listing ==
Side one

1. "I Wished on the Moon" (Ralph Rainger, Dorothy Parker) – 6:48
2. "Ain't Misbehavin'" (Fats Waller, Harry Brooks, Andy Razaf) – 4:38
3. "Everything Happens to Me" (Tom Adair, Matt Dennis) – 6:20

Side two

1. "Say It Isn't So" (Irving Berlin) – 3:01
2. "I've Got My Love to Keep Me Warm" (Irving Berlin) – 3:55
3. "Always" (Irving Berlin) – 3:57
4. "Do Nothing till You Hear from Me" (Duke Ellington, Bob Russell) – 5:00

Appended session on CD release in 1991, previously released on Billie Holiday (probably 1954)

1. "How Deep Is the Ocean" (Irving Berlin) – 3:01
2. "What a Little Moonlight Can Do" (Harry Woods) – 3:12
3. "I Cried for You" (Gus Arnheim, Arthur Freed, Abe Lyman) – 2:29

== Personnel ==
Original session of February 14, 1955

Billie Holiday with Tony Scott and his Orchestra

- Billie Holiday – Vocals
- Charlie Shavers – Trumpet
- Budd Johnson – Tenor sax
- Tony Scott – Clarinet
- Carl Drinkard / Billy Taylor – Piano
- Billy Bauer – Guitar
- Leonard Gaskin – Bass
- Cozy Cole – Drums
- Leroy Lovett – Arranger

Session of April 14, 1954, added on CD release 1991

Billie Holiday and Her Band

- Billie Holiday – Vocals
- Charlie Shavers – Trumpet
- Oscar Peterson – Piano
- Herb Ellis – Guitar
- Ray Brown – Bass
- Ed Shaughnessy – Drums
