= You Keep Sending 'Em Over and We'll Keep Knocking 'Em Down =

Song
- Language: English
- Published: 1917
- Songwriter(s): Composer: Harry Ruby; Lyricist: Sidney D. Mitchell

You Keep Sending 'Em Over and We'll Keep Knocking 'Em Down is a World War I song written by Sidney D. Mitchell and composed by Harry Ruby. The song was first published in 1917 by Waterson, Berlin & Snyder Co., in New York, NY. The sheet music cover depicts a soldier on top of a trench ladder uses his rifle as a club with an inset photo of Eddie Cantor.

The sheet music can be found at the Pritzker Military Museum & Library.
