= Billie Holiday at Jazz at the Philharmonic =

Live album by Billie Holiday
- Released: 1954
- Recorded: February 12, 1945 & June 3, October 7, 1946
- Venues: Shrine Auditorium, Los Angeles; Carnegie Hall, New York City
- Genre: Vocal jazz
- Label: Clef (Verve)
- Producer: Norman Granz

Billie Holiday chronology
Billie Holiday (1954)	Billie Holiday at Jazz at the Philharmonic (1954)	Music for Torching (1955)

Billie Holiday at Jazz at the Philharmonic (MG C-169) is the debut live album by jazz singer Billie Holiday, originally recorded on February 12, 1945, and October 3, 1946, at the Jazz at the Philharmonic concert at the Shrine Auditorium in Los Angeles, and at Carnegie Hall on June 3, 1946. The recording was released in 1954 by Clef Records.

== Content ==
Jazz at the Philharmonic, or JATP, was the title of a series of jazz concerts, tours and recordings produced by Norman Granz from 1944 through 1983. Billie Holiday would go on to perform at Jazz at the Philharmonic concerts numerous times, even joining the troupe in 1954.

Billie Holiday at Jazz at the Philharmonic was originally released as a 10-inch LP in 1954, her fourth LP for Norman Granz's Clef label. After the 10-inch form was discontinued, the 8 tracks would be rereleased as parts of various compilations, including the 10-CD box set The Complete Billie Holiday on Verve 1945–1959.

== Critical reception ==
Professional ratings
Review scores
Source	Rating
AllMusic	4.5/5 stars
DownBeat	5/5 stars
The Encyclopedia of Popular Music	3/5 stars
The New Rolling Stone Album Guide	3.5/5 stars
The Penguin Guide to Jazz Recordings	3/4 stars

Jack Tracy, editor of DownBeat, praised the album in a contemporary review:

These were recorded at a JATP concert in L. A. in 1946, and never again will Billie sound this wonderful. The years that have passed since then have taken their toll on the great stylist, but this all happened on a night when she had everything, and if you don't find this LP to be one of the most emotional half-hours you've ever spent, there's something wrong. (...) Certainly one of the outstanding records in years.

== Track listing ==
=== Side one ===
1. "Body and Soul" (Edward Heyman, Robert Sour, Frank Eyton, Johnny Green) - 3:24
2. "Strange Fruit" (Abel Meeropol as Lewis Allan) - 3:01
3. "Trav'lin' Light" (Trummy Young, Jimmy Mundy, Johnny Mercer) - 3:28
4. "He's Funny That Way" (Richard Whiting, Neil Moret) - 2:56

=== Side two ===
1. "The Man I Love" (George Gershwin, Ira Gershwin) - 3:04
2. "Gee, Baby, Ain't I Good to You" (Andy Razaf, Don Redman) - 2:19
3. "All of Me" (Gerald Marks, Seymour Simons) - 1:55
4. "Billie's Blues" (Billie Holiday) - 3:39

== Personnel ==
=== February 12, 1945 (tracks 1–2) ===
Billie Holiday, vocals
Lester Young, tenor sax
Illinois Jacquet, tenor sax
George Auld, alto sax
Buck Clayton, trumpet
Ken Kersey, piano
Tiny Grimes, guitar
JC Heard, drums
Al McKibbon, bass

=== October 7, 1946 (tracks 3–4) ===
Billie Holiday, vocals
Illinois Jacquet, tenor sax
Trummy Young, trombone
Howard McGhee, trumpet
Ken Kersey, piano
Barney Kessel, guitar
Jack Mills, drums
Charlie Drayton, bass

=== June 3, 1946 (tracks 5–8) ===
Same as February 12, 1945, personnel.
