= All or Nothing at All (album) =

Studio album by Billie Holiday
- Released: 1958
- Recorded: August 1956, January 1957
- Genres: Jazz, vocal jazz
- Length: 50:36
- Label: Verve
- Producer: Norman Granz

Billie Holiday chronology
Stay with Me (1958)	All or Nothing at All (1958)	Lady in Satin (1958)

Professional ratings
Review scores
Source	Rating
AllMusic	4.5/5 stars
The Encyclopedia of Popular Music	5/5 stars
The Penguin Guide to Jazz Recordings	4/4 stars

All or Nothing at All is the tenth studio album by jazz singer Billie Holiday, released in 1958 on Verve Records, catalog MGV8329. There are 12 songs on the LP taken from five different recording sessions that took place in 1956 and 1957. Holiday was backed by a "relaxed and understanding" small combo which included the trumpeter Harry "Sweets" Edison and the saxophonist Ben Webster. A 1959 New York Times article noted that Holiday's voice "had become a very limited instrument which she used with the craft and guile of an aging pitcher who can no longer pour his fast one across the plate."

Album cover art is by David Stone Martin.

== Track listing ==
=== Original LP release ===
LP side 1

1. "Do Nothing till You Hear from Me" (Duke Ellington, Bob Russell) – 4:12
2. "Cheek to Cheek" (Irving Berlin) – 3:35
3. "Ill Wind" (Harold Arlen, Ted Koehler) – 6:14
4. "Speak Low" (Ogden Nash, Kurt Weill) – 4:25
5. "We'll Be Together Again" (Carl T. Fischer, Frankie Laine) – 4:24
6. "All or Nothing at All" (Arthur Altman, Jack Lawrence) – 5:39

LP side 2

1. "Sophisticated Lady" (Ellington, Irving Mills, Mitchell Parish) – 4:48
2. "April in Paris" (Vernon Duke, E. Y. Harburg) – 3:02
3. "I Wished on the Moon" (Dorothy Parker, Ralph Rainger) – 3:25
4. "But Not for Me" (George Gershwin, Ira Gershwin) – 3:48
5. "Say It Isn't So" (Irving Berlin) – 3:22
6. "Our Love Is Here to Stay" (Gershwin, Gershwin) – 3:41

== Personnel ==
- Billie Holiday – vocals
- Harry "Sweets" Edison – trumpet
- Ben Webster – tenor saxophone
- Jimmy Rowles – piano
- Red Mitchell – bass
- Joe Mondragon – bass
- Alvin Stoller – drums
- Barney Kessell - guitar

== Other versions ==
- All Or Nothing At All (LP), Verve Records, US, 1959
- All Or Nothing At All (LP, RE), Verve Records, Spain, 2010
- All Or Nothing At All (LP, Album, RE), Verve Records, France, 2011
- All Or Nothing At All (LP), Verve Records, Analogue Productions US 2012
- All Or Nothing At All (LP, RE, Album), WaxTime, Europe, 2012
- All Or Nothing At All (LP, Album, RE), Verve Records US

== CD Reissue ==
A 2 CD re-issue from 1995 combined all of the tracks from this and two other Holiday albums recorded at the same time, Body and Soul and Songs for Distingué Lovers, with two additional bonus tracks taken from the same recording sessions.

=== CD Reissue track listing ===
CD disc 1

1. "Do Nothin' Till You Hear from Me" (Ellington, Russell) – 4:12
2. "Cheek to Cheek" (Berlin) – 3:35
3. "Ill Wind" (Arlen, Koehler) – 6:14
4. "Speak Low" (Nash, Weill) – 4:25
5. "We'll Be Together Again" (Fischer, Laine) – 4:24
6. "All or Nothing at All" (Altman, Lawrence) – 5:39
7. "Sophisticated Lady" (Ellington, Mills, Parish) – 4:48
8. "April in Paris" (Duke, Harburg) – 3:02
9. "I Wished on the Moon" (Parker, Rainger) – 3:25
10. "Moonlight in Vermont" (John Blackburn, Karl Suessdorf) – 3:49
11. "Foggy Day" (Gershwin, Gershwin) – 4:40
12. "I Didn't Know What Time It Was" (Lorenz Hart, Richard Rodgers) – 5:59
13. "Just One of Those Things" (Cole Porter) – 5:31
14. "Comes Love" (alternate take, bonus track) – 3:58
15. "Comes Love" (Lew Brown, Sam H. Stept, Charles Tobias) – 4:00

CD disc 2

1. "Day In, Day Out" (Rube Bloom, Johnny Mercer) – 6:47
2. "Darn That Dream" (Eddie DeLange, Jimmy Van Heusen) – 6:19
3. "But Not for Me" (Gershwin, Gershwin) – 3:48
4. "Body and Soul" (Eyton, Johnny Green, Edward Heyman, Robert Sour) – 6:22
5. "Just Friends" (John Klenner, Sam M. Lewis) (instrumental, bonus track) – 6:26
6. "Stars Fell on Alabama" (Parish, Frank Perkins) – 4:29
7. "Say It Isn't So" (Berlin) – 3:22
8. "Our Love Is Here to Stay" (Gershwin, Gershwin) – 3:41
9. "One for My Baby (and One More for the Road)" (Arlen, Mercer) – 5:39
10. "They Can't Take That Away from Me" (Gershwin, Gershwin) – 7:10
11. "Embraceable You" (Gershwin, Gershwin) – 6:47
12. "Let's Call the Whole Thing Off" (Gershwin, Gershwin) – 3:24
13. "Gee Baby, Ain't I Good to You" (Andy Razaf, Don Redman) – 5:37
