= Universal Love – Wedding Songs Reimagined =

Compilation album by Various artists
- Released: April 5, 2018
- Length: 18:58
- Label: Legacy Recordings
- Producers: Rob Kaplan (also exec.); Tom Murphy; Drew Pearson

Universal Love – Wedding Songs Reimagined is a 2018 album of same-sex wedding songs by various artists, promoted by MGM Resorts. It features wedding songs with gender-specific terms adjusted to refer to the same gender as the singer.

On 9 April 2018, Kesha released her song from the album, "I Need a Woman to Love" (a reworking of "I Need a Man to Love", originally sung by Janis Joplin on the album Cheap Thrills) with a video featuring Kesha officiating at a same-sex wedding. The music video won Best Editing at the 2019 Webby Awards.

The compilation was followed up later in April 2018 by a single by She & Him of “He Gives His Love to Me” and “She Gives Her Love to Me.”

== Track listing ==
No.	Title	Writer(s)	Artist	Length
1.	"He's Funny That Way" (originally "She's Funny That Way")	Neil Moret, Richard A. Whiting	Bob Dylan	3:31
2.	"And Then She Kissed Me" (originally "Then He Kissed Me")	Phil Spector, Ellie Greenwich, Jeff Barry	St Vincent	2:07
3.	"My Guy" (originally "My Girl")	Smokey Robinson, Ronald White	Kele Okereke	2:56
4.	"Mad About the Girl" (originally "Mad About the Boy")	Noël Coward	Valerie June	3:12
5.	"And I Love Him" (originally "And I Love Her")	Lennon–McCartney	Ben Gibbard	2:43
6.	"I Need a Woman to Love" (originally "I Need a Man to Love")	Sam Andrew, Janis Joplin	Kesha	4:29
Total length:				18:58
