= Lady Day Swings =

Compilation album by Billie Holiday
- Released: July 30, 2002
- Genre: Jazz, swing
- Length: 45:51
- Label: Legacy
- Producer: Michael Brooks

Lady Day Swings is a compilation album by jazz singer Billie Holiday (also known as Lady Day). It was released in 2002 by Sony Music's Legacy Recordings and presents a collection of 16 songs drawn from the Lady Day: The Complete Billie Holiday on Columbia 1933–1944 box set released by Legacy Recordings in 2001.

== Background ==
Focusing on Holiday's recordings with swing bands between 1935 and 1941 in New York, the album gives an insight into Holiday's earlier, swing-style work. The album features renditions of songs by well-known composers and songwriters, such as Cole Porter or Irving Berlin. The songs were originally recorded under Brunswick Records, Vocalion Records and Okeh Records, all secondary labels of Columbia Records. In 1933, at the age of 17, Holiday met John Hammond, who was a producer and journalist working for Columbia Records at the time. He introduced her to jazz musicians such as Benny Goodman or jazz pianist Teddy Wilson and his band, whom she collaborated with for many of her early recordings and several of those included in this compilation. Her collaboration with big bands at the time differed from her later music, but already reflected her own distinct style. In an essay published in 1962, music critic Ralph J. Gleason even argues that recordings from these early years feature a joy to her voice that declined in her later years. Her work during these years introduced her to record labels and laid the groundwork for her fame.

== Track listing ==
No.	Title	Writer(s)	Length
1.	"What a Little Moonlight Can Do" (feat: Teddy Wilson)	Harry M. Woods	02:58
2.	"Let's Do It, Let's Fall in Love" (feat: Eddie Heywood Jr.)	Cole Porter	02:57
3.	"You'd Be So Easy to Love" (feat: Teddy Wilson)	Cole Porter	03:13
4.	"Getting Some Fun Out of Life"	Joe Burke, Edgar Leslie	03:03
5.	"He Ain't Got Rhythm" (feat: Teddy Wilson)	Irving Berlin	02:51
6.	"I Hear Music"	Burton Lane, Frank Loesser	02:42
7.	"If Dreams Come True" (feat: Teddy Wilson)	Benny Goodman, Irving Mills, Edgar Sampson	03:05
8.	"I'm Gonna Lock My Heart (And Throw Away the Key)"	Jim Eaton, Terry Shand	02:07
9.	"Romance in the Dark" (feat: Eddie Heywood Jr.)	Sam Coslow, Lillian Green, Gertrude Neisen	02:16
10.	"I've Got My Love to Keep Me Warm"	Irving Berlin	02:57
11.	"Miss Brown to You" (feat: Teddy Wilson)		03:00
12.	"Nice Work If You Can Get It" (feat: Teddy Wilson)	George Gershwin, Ira Gershwin	03:09
13.	"Spreadin' Rhythm Around" (feat: Teddy Wilson)	Ted Koehler, Jimmy McHugh	02:55
14.	"Swing, Brother, Swing"	Lewis Raymond, Walter Bishop Sr., Clarence Williams	02:57
15.	"A Fine Romance"	Dorothy Fields, Jerome Kern	02:53
16.	"Them There Eyes"	Maceo Pinkard, Doris Tauber, William Tracey	02:48
