= Lady Sings the Blues (Billie Holiday album) =

Studio album by Billie Holiday
- Released: December 1956
- Recorded: September 3, 1954, Los Angeles, Capitol; June 6–7, 1956, New York City, Fine Sound
- Genre: Jazz
- Length: 38:17
- Label: Clef
- Producer: Norman Granz

Billie Holiday chronology
The Lady Sings (1956)	Lady Sings the Blues (1956)	Body and Soul (1957)

Professional ratings
Review scores
Source	Rating
AllMusic	4/5 stars
DownBeat	5/5 stars
The Encyclopedia of Popular Music	5/5 stars
The Penguin Guide to Jazz Recordings	3/4 stars

Lady Sings the Blues is the sixth studio album by the jazz singer Billie Holiday, released in December 1956. It was Holiday's last album released on Clef Records; the following year, the label would be absorbed by Verve Records. Lady Sings the Blues was taken from sessions taped during 1954 and 1956. It was released simultaneously with her autobiography of the same name.

== Content ==
Taken from sessions taped during 1954–1956, Lady Sings the Blues features Holiday backed by tenor saxophonist Paul Quinichette, trumpeter Charlie Shavers, pianist Wynton Kelly, and guitarist Kenny Burrell. Though Holiday's voice had arguably deteriorated by the 1950s, the album is well regarded – in a 1956 review, DownBeat awarded the album 5 out of 5 stars, and had this to say about the co-current book:

Lady Sings The Blues is Billie Holiday's autobiography [...] she tries to get the reader on her side of the mirror, so don't expect a three-dimensional view of the subject. The book was written with William Dufty, assistant to the editor of the New York Post [...] Seldom in the book does she talk about her singing[.]

On November 10, 1956, Holiday appeared in concert at Carnegie Hall in front of a sold-out crowd. The show was planned to commemorate the edition of her autobiography, some paragraphs being read and interspersed during the musical performance.

== Track listing ==
Side 1

1. "Lady Sings the Blues" (Billie Holiday, Herbie Nichols) – 3:46
2. "Trav'lin' Light" (Trummy Young, Jimmy Mundy, Johnny Mercer) – 3:08
3. "I Must Have That Man" (Dorothy Fields, Jimmy McHugh) – 3:04
4. "Some Other Spring" (Irene Higginbotham, Arthur Herzog Jr.) – 3:36
5. "Strange Fruit" (Lewis Allan) – 3:05
6. "No Good Man" (Higginbotham, Sammy Gallop, Dan Fisher) – 3:18

Side 2

1. "God Bless the Child" (Holiday, Herzog Jr.) – 4:00
2. "Good Morning Heartache" (Higginbotham, Ervin Drake, Dan Fisher) – 3:28
3. "Love Me or Leave Me" (Walter Donaldson, Gus Kahn) – 2:38
4. "Too Marvelous for Words" (Mercer, Richard Whiting) – 2:16
5. "Willow Weep for Me" (Ann Ronell) – 3:08
6. "I Thought About You" (Jimmy Van Heusen, Mercer) – 2:47

When issued on CD, 3 bonus tracks from the 3 September recording were added:

1. "P.S. I Love You" (Gordon Jenkins, Mercer) – 3:36
2. "Softly" (Eddie Beal, Joe Greene) – 2:55
3. "Stormy Blues" (Holiday) – 3:27

== Personnel ==
June 6 and 7 1956, Fine Sound Studios, New York City (Tracks 1–8)

- Billie Holiday – vocals
- Paul Quinichette – tenor saxophone
- Charlie Shavers – trumpet
- Tony Scott – clarinet
- Wynton Kelly – piano
- Kenny Burrell – guitar
- Lenny McBrowne – drums
- Aaron Bell – bass

September 3, 1954, Capitol Studios

- Billie Holiday – vocals
- Willie Smith – alto saxophone
- Harry Edison – trumpet
- Bobby Tucker – piano
- Barney Kessel – guitar
- Chico Hamilton – drums
- Red Callender – bass
