= Milton Drake =

American lyricist and performing rights administrator (1912–2006)

Milton Drake (August 3, 1912 – November 13, 2006) was an American lyricist and performing rights administrator.

As a child, he performed in vaudevilles, in films and on radio. Later he wrote special material for theater and nightclub revues, including "Cotton Club Parade", "Riviera Follies", "Paradise Parade", and "Latin Quarter Revue". Drake's musical collaborators included Oscar Levant, Al Hoffman, Jerry Livingston, Louis Alter, Ben Oakland and Con Conrad, among others.

Drake was a member of the American Guild of Authors and Composers for 28 years, and for 5 years was the chairman of the AGAC council. In August 1962 he resigned from AGAC in protest, criticizing the lack of progressive leadership at the organisation, and their relationship with music publishers.

In 1949 Drake married the singer Adele Clark, Decca recording artist and star of The Adele Clark Show. His brother was songwriter Ervin Drake (1919-2015).

== Notable songs ==
- "Java Jive" (1940)
- "If It’s You" (1941)
- "Mairzy Doats" (1943)
- "Fuzzy Wuzzy" (1944)
- "Nina Never Knew" (1952)
- "She Broke My Heart in Three Places"
- "My Dreams are Gone with the Wind"
- "Has Hitler Made a Monkey Out of You?"
