= An Evening with Billie Holiday =

1953 studio album by Billie Holiday

Studio album by Billie Holiday
- Released: March 1953
- Recorded: April 1952; July 27, 1952
- Genre: Jazz
- Length: 23:45
- Label: Clef (Verve)
- Producer: Norman Granz

Billie Holiday chronology
| Billie Holiday Sings (1952) | An Evening with Billie Holiday (1953) | Billie Holiday (1954) |

A Recital by Billie Holiday

Compilation album by Billie Holiday
- Released: 1956
- Recorded: April 1952; July 27, 1952; April 14, 1954
- Genre: Vocal jazz
- Length: 36:52
- Label: Clef (Verve)
- Producer: Norman Granz

Billie Holiday chronology
| A Recital by Billie Holiday (1956) | Solitude (1956) |

Professional ratings
Review scores
| Source | Rating |
|---|---|
| AllMusic | 3/5 stars |
| DownBeat | 5/5 stars |
| The Encyclopedia of Popular Music | 3/5 stars |

Professional ratings
Review scores
| Source | Rating |
|---|---|
| AllMusic | 3/5 stars |
| The Encyclopedia of Popular Music | 3/5 stars |
| The Penguin Guide to Jazz Recordings | 3/4 stars |

An Evening with Billie Holiday (MG C-144) is the second studio album by jazz singer Billie Holiday, released by Clef Records in 1953.

In 1956, when the 10-inch format was phased out, the album was reissued by Clef with the same artwork, and seven of the eight tracks, as a 12-inch LP called A Recital by Billie Holiday (MG C-686). The track "Tenderly", was moved to another 12-inch compilation called Solitude. Five additional tracks were added that had been previously released on her third 10-inch LP, simply titled Billie Holiday.

== Track listing ==
=== 1953 10-inch LP, An Evening with Billie Holiday ===
A side

1. "Stormy Weather" (Harold Arlen, Ted Koehler) – 3:41
2. "Lover Come Back to Me" (Sigmund Romberg, Oscar Hammerstein II) – 3:36
3. "My Man" (Jacques Charles, Channing Pollock, Albert Willemetz, Maurice Yvain) – 2:37
4. "He's Funny That Way" (Richard Whiting, Neil Moret) – 3:11

B side

1. "Yesterdays" (Jerome Kern, Otto Harbach) – 2:49
2. "Tenderly" (Walter Gross, Jack Lawrence) – 3:23
3. "I Can't Face the Music" (Rube Bloom, Ted Koehler) – 3:14
4. "Remember" (Irving Berlin) – 2:34

=== 1956 12-inch LP, A Recital By Billie Holiday ===
A side

1. "If the Moon Turns Green" (George Cates, Bernie Hanighen) – 2:46
2. "Remember" (Irving Berlin) – 2:34
3. "Autumn in New York" (Vernon Duke) – 3:43
4. "My Man" (Jacques Charles, Channing Pollock, Albert Willemetz, Maurice Yvain) – 2:37
5. "Lover Come Back to Me" (Sigmund Romberg, Oscar Hammerstein II) – 3:36
6. "Stormy Weather" (Harold Arlen, Ted Koehler) – 3:41

B side

1. "Yesterdays" (Jerome Kern, Otto Harbach – 2:49
2. "He's Funny That Way" (Richard Whiting, Neil Moret) – 3:11
3. "I Can't Face the Music" (Rube Bloom, Ted Koehler) – 3:14
4. "How Deep Is the Ocean?" (Irving Berlin) – 3:00
5. "What a Little Moonlight Can Do" (Harry M. Woods) – 3:14
6. "I Cried for You" (Gus Arnheim, Arthur Freed, Abe Lyman) – 2:27

== Personnel ==
The personnel of the original 10-inch LP are from two different recording dates, with different musicians. The 12-inch LP adds one track from each of the two sessions, as well as three tracks from a 1954 session.

April 1952 (exact date unknown)
(Evening tracks B3-4; Recital tracks A1-A3):

- Billie Holiday – vocals
- Charlie Shavers – trumpet
- Flip Phillips – tenor saxophone
- Oscar Peterson – piano
- Barney Kessel – guitar
- Alvin Stoller – drums
- Ray Brown – bass

July 27, 1952
(Evening tracks A1-B2; Recital tracks A4-6, B1-3):

- Billie Holiday – vocals
- Joe Newman – trumpet
- Paul Quinichette – tenor saxophone
- Oscar Peterson – piano (organ on "Yesterdays")
- Freddie Green – guitar
- Gus Johnson – drums
- Ray Brown – bass

April 14, 1954
(Recital tracks B4-6)

- Billie Holiday – vocals
- Charlie Shavers – trumpet
- Oscar Peterson – piano
- Herb Ellis – guitar
- Ed Shaughnessy – drums
- Ray Brown – bass
