= Greatest Hits (Diana Ross album) =

Compilation album by Diana Ross
- Released: 1972
- Label: Tamla-Motown

Diana Ross chronology
Lady Sings the Blues (1972)	Greatest Hits (1972)	Touch Me in the Morning (1973)

Greatest Hits is a compilation album by American singer Diana Ross. It was released through Tamla-Motown in 1972 in England and Australia, comprising singles from her studio albums Diana Ross (1970), Everything Is Everything (1970), and Surrender (1971). It reached number 34 on the UK Albums Chart and was certified gold by the British Phonographic Industry (BPI) for sales in excess of 100,000 copies.

== Track listing ==
Side A
No.	Title	Writer(s)	Original album	Length
1.	"Remember Me"	Nickolas Ashford; Valerie Simpson	Surrender	3:16
2.	"Didn't You Know (You'd Have to Cry Sometime)"	Ashford; Simpson	Surrender	2:56
3.	"Doobedood'ndoobe, Doobedood'ndoobe, Doobedood'ndoo"	Deke Richards	Everything Is Everything	4:52
4.	"Surrender"	Ashford; Simpson	Surrender	2:53
5.	"And If You See Him"	Ashford; Simpson	Surrender	2:50
6.	"Ain't No Mountain High Enough"	Ashford; Simpson	Diana Ross	6:16

Side B
No.	Title	Writer(s)	Original album	Length
1.	"How About You?"	Richards; Sandra Sanders; David Van De Pitte	Everything Is Everything	2:47
2.	"Reach Out and Touch (Somebody's Hand)"	Ashford; Simpson	Diana Ross	3:02
3.	"These Things Will Keep Me Loving You"	Johnny Bristol; Harvey Fuqua; Sylvia Moy	Diana Ross	3:06
4.	"Reach Out (I'll Be There)"	Lamont Dozier; Brian Holland; Eddie Holland	Surrender	4:50
5.	"(They Long to Be) Close to You"	Burt Bacharach; Hal David	Everything Is Everything	4:07
6.	"I'm Still Waiting"	Richards	Everything Is Everything	3:44

== Charts ==
Chart (1972)	Peak position
UK Albums (OCC)	34

== Certifications ==
Region	Certification	Certified units/sales
United Kingdom (BPI)	Gold	100,000^{^}
^{^} Shipments figures based on certification alone.
