= You Turned the Tables on Me =

Popular 1930s song

Single by Benny Goodman and His Orchestra with Helen Ward
- B-side: "Here's Love in Your Eyes"
- Published: 1936 by Sam Fox Publishing Company
- Recorded: August 13, 1936
- Genre: Traditional pop; swing
- Length: 2:46
- Label: Victor 25391
- Composer: Louis Alter
- Lyricist: Sidney D. Mitchell

"You Turned the Tables on Me" is a popular song composed by Louis Alter with lyrics by Sidney D. Mitchell. It was written for the 1936 film Sing, Baby, Sing, in which it was performed by Alice Faye. The song was soon recorded by Benny Goodman (with vocal refrain by Helen Ward) for Victor Records and topped many charts, reaching No. 3 on Your Hit Parade in November of that year. Goodman later recorded the song again, this time with vocalist Martha Tilton, for the soundtrack of the 1956 biopic The Benny Goodman Story. It has since been covered many times.
