= Coot Grant =

American singer and songwriter

- Also known as: Leola Wilson, Patsy Hunter
- Born: Leola B. Henton or Pettigrew; June 17, 1893; Birmingham, Alabama, United States
- Died: December 26, 1970 (aged 77) Riverside County, California, U.S.
- Genres: Classic female blues, country blues, vaudeville
- Occupations: Singer, guitarist, songwriter
- Instruments: Vocals, guitar
- Years active: 1900s–1950s
- Labels: Paramount, various

Coot Grant (June 11 or 17, 1893 – December 26, 1970) was an American classic female blues, country blues, and vaudeville singer and songwriter. On her own and with her husband and musical partner, Wesley "Kid" Wilson, she was popular with African American audiences from the 1910s to the early 1930s.

== Biography ==
Grant was born either Leola B. Henton or Leola B. Pettigrew in Birmingham, Alabama, one of fifteen children in her family. The first part of her stage name was derived from her childhood nickname, Cutie. She began working in vaudeville in 1900 in Atlanta, Georgia, and the following year toured South Africa and Europe with Mayme Remington's Pickaninnies. She was sometimes billed as Patsy Hunter. In 1913, she married the singer Isiah I. Grant, and they worked on stage together before his death in 1920. She married Wesley Wilson the same year. He used several stage names, later being billed as Catjuice Charlie (in a brief duo with Pigmeat Pete), Kid Wilson, Jenkins, Socks, and Sox Wilson. He played the piano and organ, while she played the guitar, sang and danced.

The duo's billing varied. They performed as Grant and Wilson, Kid and Coot, and Hunter and Jenkins, as they went on to appear and later record with Fletcher Henderson, Mezz Mezzrow, Sidney Bechet, and Louis Armstrong. They performed separately and together in vaudeville, musical comedies, revues and traveling shows. They also appeared in the film The Emperor Jones (1933), with Paul Robeson.

The couple wrote more than 400 songs over their working life, including "Gimme a Pigfoot (And a Bottle of Beer)" (1933) and "Take Me for a Buggy Ride", both of which were recorded by Bessie Smith, and "Find Me at the Greasy Spoon" and "Prince of Wails" for Fletcher Henderson. Their own renditions included the diverse "Come on Coot, Do That Thing" (1925), "Dem Socks Dat My Pappy Wore," and "Throat Cutting Blues" (which remains unreleased).

In 1926, Grant and Blind Blake recorded a selection of country blues songs. They were Blake's first recordings.

Grant and Wilson's act, once a rival of Butterbeans and Susie, began to lose favor with the public by the mid-1930s, but they recorded more songs in 1938. Their only child, Bobby Wilson, was born in 1941.

By 1946, Mezz Mezzrow had founded the King Jazz record label and engaged Grant and Wilson as songwriters. In that year, the association led to their final recording session, backed by a quintet including Bechet and Mezzrow. In December 1948, Record Changer magazine reported that Grant and Wilson had opened a new show in Newark, New Jersey, "an old time revue called 'Holiday in Blues.'"

Wilson retired in ill health shortly thereafter, but Grant continued performing into the 1950s. In a May 1951 Record Changer magazine poll, she was listed in a roster of notable female vocalists, but she received fewer than five votes in the poll; the top spot went to Bessie Smith, who received 381 votes. In January 1953, one commentator observed that Grant and Wilson had moved from New York City to Los Angeles and were in financial hardship.

According to blues archivists Bob Eagle and Eric LeBlanc, Grant (Leola B. Johnson) died in Riverside County, California, in 1970, aged 77.

Her entire recorded work, with and without Wilson, was issued in three volumes by Document Records in 1988.

== Compilation discography ==
Year	Title	Record label
1998	Complete Recorded Works, Vol. 1 (1925–1928)	Document
1998	Complete Recorded Works, Vol. 2 (1928–1931)	Document
1998	Complete Recorded Works, Vol. 3 (1931–1938)	Document

== See also ==
- List of classic female blues singers
