= Velvet Mood =

Studio album by Billie Holiday
- Released: 1956
- Recorded: August 23 & 25, 1955
- Studios: Los Angeles, CA
- Genres: Jazz, swing
- Length: 37:41
- Label: Clef MG C-713 (Verve MG V-8096)
- Producer: Norman Granz

Billie Holiday chronology
Music for Torching (1955)	Velvet Mood (1956)	The Lady Sings (1956)

Velvet Mood: Songs by Billie Holiday is the fifth studio album by jazz singer Billie Holiday, released in 1956 on Clef Records. The music was recorded over the course of two sessions in Los Angeles, two days apart, which also resulted in all the material for her previous album Music for Torching (MG C-669).

Professional ratings
Review scores
Source	Rating
AllMusic	3/5 stars
The Encyclopedia of Popular Music	3/5 stars

== Track listing ==
=== Side one ===
1. "Prelude to a Kiss" (Duke Ellington, Irving Mills, Irving Gordon) - 5:37
2. "When Your Lover Has Gone" (Einar Aaron Swan) - 4:58
3. "Please Don't Talk About Me When I'm Gone" (Sam H. Stept, Sidney Clare, Bee Palmer) - 4:23
4. "Nice Work If You Can Get It" (George Gershwin, Ira Gershwin) - 3:48

=== Side two ===
1. "I Gotta Right to Sing the Blues" (Harold Arlen, Ted Koehler) - 5:55
2. "What's New?" (Bob Haggart, Johnny Burke) – 4:20
3. "I Hadn't Anyone Till You" (Ray Noble) – 4:05
4. "Everything I Have Is Yours" (Burton Lane, Harold Adamson) – 4:33

== Personnel ==
- Billie Holiday - Vocals
- Benny Carter - Alto saxophone
- Harry "Sweets" Edison - Trumpet
- Jimmy Rowles - Piano, celesta on "I Hadn't Anyone Till You", "Everything I Have Is Yours", and "What's New?"
- Barney Kessel - Guitar
- John Simmons - Bass
- Larry Bunker - Drums
- Alex de Paula - Artwork
