= The Complete Billie Holiday on Verve 1945–1959 =

Box set by Billie Holiday
- Released: 1992
- Genre: Vocal jazz
- Label: Verve

The Complete Billie Holiday on Verve 1945–1959 is a 10 CD boxset by jazz vocalist Billie Holiday compiling her complete recordings on Verve. It was released in 1992 by Verve.

== Critical reception ==
Professional ratings
Review scores
Source	Rating
The Penguin Guide to Jazz Recordings	4/4 stars
The Penguin Guide to Jazz Recordings	(Billie's Best)
AllMusic	5/5 stars

The Penguin Guide to Jazz says, "The circle is now closed on Holiday's career: the various multi-disc packages allow anyone to follow her from the beginning to the end. There are rarities in this major collection, which includes what are often wryly funny rehearsal tapes with Jimmy Rowles (strange to hear this famously tormented woman laugh and tell jokes), but its main purpose is to provide first-to-last coverage of her major studio years. There is splendid documentation to go with the records."

Concerning Billie's Best, they go on to call it "a useful pocket edition that samples the big box. There are no fewer than 11 other compilations listed in the Verve catalogue, and of course countless of others of less impeccable provenance, the best of the work there is a pointless duplication: the Jazz Masters discs ... remain good enough."

Scott Yanow of AllMusic says, "This is a rather incredible collection: ten CDs enclosed in a tight black box that includes every one of the recordings Verve owns of Billie Holiday, not only the many studio recordings of 1952–57 (which feature Lady Day joined by such jazz all-stars as trumpeters Charlie Shavers and Harry 'Sweets' Edison, altoist Benny Carter, and the tenors of Flip Phillips, Paul Quinichette and Ben Webster). Also included are prime performances at Jazz at the Philharmonic concerts in 1945–1947, an enjoyable European gig from 1954, her 'comeback' Carnegie Hall concert of 1956, Holiday's rather sad final studio album from 1959, and even lengthy tapes from two informal rehearsals. It's a perfect purchase for the true Billie Holiday fanatic."

Ian Carr, writing for Classical Music, says:

Here we have two sumptuous packages covering virtually the whole output of the most revered and sublime jazz singer – Billie Holiday (1915-1959). The Columbia collection deals with the years 1933-42 (with a couple of tracks from 1958 thrown in), which was her golden period and includes her most beautiful recordings with Teddy Wilson and Lester Young.

A 52-page illustrated booklet gives her biography and details of the recording sessions. The Verve boxed set charts her career from the mid-Forties, when though a heroin addict she was still at the height of her powers, to her tragic decline and death at the age of 44.

There is a wealth of new material including two CDs of actual rehearsal sessions with conversation and anecdotes, tracks from concert performances, and previously unpublished photographs. These two boxed sets brilliantly document the triumphs and tragedy of this 20th-century icon.

Leonard Feather, writing for the LA Times, says:

Holiday by the 1950s, when almost all these tracks were recorded, had passed her prime. The sui generis timbre had less assurance, giving way at times to raspy, coarsened sounds. Yet right up to the end she had her good days. But Polygram, in assembling this package, threw in everything: good, bad and irrelevant. There are about 35 aborted, rejected, incomplete or imperfect takes; numerous songs are repeated at two or three sessions, though even the annotator acknowledges that her vocals varied little from take to take.

To elongate the contents even further, there are readings from her ghostwritten pseudo-autobiography; Holiday at rehearsal struggling with songs she doesn’t know; various announcements introducing Lady Day, even a couple in German by me (in 1954 I took her on her only European concert tour); conversations by Holiday in the studio and at the homes of friends; Billie’s band playing a six-minute number without her; Holiday talking to her 15-month-old godson; the child banging away at a piano.

Some of this has historical curiosity value for a single hearing, but do great artists have no right to privacy, even posthumously? On Disc 5, “A Fine Romance” shows up eight times. There is one master take and an alternate take; the rest are incomplete takes or false starts. Thus a three-minute performance is expanded into 15 1/2 minutes of mostly wasted space.

There are plus factors here: a 220-page booklet with many photos to remind us of her transcendent beauty; literate essays by critics and musicians; data galore. Disc 1, with many of Norman Granz’s live “Jazz at the Philharmonic” sessions, benefits from the concert immediacy and finds Billie in superb voice. From that point on, it’s a roller-coaster ride tracing her on-and-off nights.

There are several interesting oddities. Billie sings “My Yiddishe Mama” at someone’s home; Oscar Peterson plays organ backing a memorable version of “Yesterdays.”

Her set at the 1957 Newport Festival is described in the notes as “pitiful,” “forlorn,” “enfeebled,” “disoriented” and “painfully out of tune.”

The very last session--in March, 1959, four months before her death at 44 after a losing battle with addiction--found her in remission from these flaws. Ray Ellis provided splendid arrangements, and the repertoire avoids reuse of the same songs that she had recorded too often. (Many of the tunes in this box had been sung definitively during her years on Columbia--now on “Billie Holiday, the Legacy,” a three-CD set--or later on Decca, as collected in “The Complete Decca Recordings” on two CDs.)

== Track listing ==
	Jazz at the Philharmonic Concert 1945-1947 (Los Angeles – New York)	
1-1	Body and Soul	3:24
1-2	Strange Fruit	2:56
1-3	I Cried for You	2:18
1-4	Fine and Mellow	3:51
1-5	He's Funny That Way	3:17
1-6	The Man I Love	3:04
1-7	Gee Baby, Ain't I Good to You?	2:20
1-8	All of Me	1:56
1-9	Billie's Blues	3:35
1-10	Travelin' Light	3:28
1-11	He's Funny That Way	2:51
1-12	Norman Granz Announcement	0:08
1-13	You Better Go Now	2:56
1-14	You're Driving Me Crazy	1:30
1-15	There Is No Greater Love	2:34
1-16	I Cover the Waterfront	2:58
1-17	Norman Granz Announcement	0:24
	1952 Los Angeles & New York Studio Sessions	
1-18	East of the Sun	2:54
1-19	Blue Moon	3:28
1-20	You Got to My Head	2:54
1-21	You Turned the Tables on Me	3:26
1-22	Easy to Love	3:00
1-23	These Foolish Things	3:34
1-24	I Only Have Eyes for You	2:52
1-25	Solitude	3:29
2-1	Everything I Have Is Yours	3:43
2-2	Love for Sale	2:56
2-3	Moonglow	2:58
2-4	Tenderly	3:23
2-5	If the Moon Turns Green	2:44
2-6	Remember	2:35
2-7	Autumn in New York (Common Take-LP)	3:40
2-8	Autumn in New York (Rare Take-78 Rpm)	3:52
2-9	My Man	2:36
2-10	Lover, Come Back to Me	3:35
2-11	Stormy Weather	3:41
2-12	Yesterdays	2:48
2-13	He's Funny That Way	3:11
2-14	I Can't Face the Music	3:14
	1954 – Jazz Club USA Concert, Cologne, Germany	
2-15	MC and Leonard Feather Announcements	0:37
2-16	Blue Moon	2:15
2-17	All of Me	1:43
2-18	My Man	2:52
2-19	Them There Eyes	1:28
2-20	I Cried for You	3:20
2-21	What a Little Moonlight Can Do	2:56
2-22	I Cover the Waterfront	3:17
2-23	Leonard Feather's Announcement	0:21
2-24	Billie's Blues (Aka "I Love My Man")	11:39
3-1	Lover, Come Back to Me	6:46
	1954 Los Angeles & New York Studio Sessions	
3-2	How Deep Is the Ocean	2:57
3-3	What a Little Moonlight Can Do?	3:10
3-4	I Cried for You	2:26
3-5	Love Me or Leave Me	2:33
3-6	P.S. I Love You	3:35
3-7	Too Marvelous for Words	2:11
3-8	Softly	2:55
3-9	I Thought About You	2:45
3-10	Willow Weep for Me	3:05
3-11	Stormy Blues	3:26
	1955 Los Angeles & New York Studio Sessions	
3-12	Say It Isn't So	3:01
3-13	I've Got My Love to Keep Me Warm	3:55
3-14	I Wished on the Moon	6:43
3-15	Always	3:57
3-16	Everything Happens to Me	6:20
3-17	Do Nothing 'till You Hear from Me	5:00
3-18	Ain't Misbehavin'	4:39
4-1	Nice Work If You Can Get It	4:05
4-2	Discussion; Nice Work If You Can Get It	0:40
4-3	Mandy Is Two	4:31
4-4	Prelude to a Kiss	2:46
4-5	I Must Have That Man!	1:05
4-6	Jeepers Creepers	2:13
4-7	Jeepers Creepers	0:51
4-8	Discussion; Jeepers Creepers	3:25
4-9	Discussion; Jeepers Creepers	2:27
4-10	Please Don't Talk About Me When I'm Gone	1:57
4-11	Please Don't Talk About Me When I'm Gone	2:57
4-12	Discussion: Moonlight in Vermont	0:52
4-13	Misery	0:36
4-14	Restless	2:45
4-15	Moonlight in Vermont	2:00
4-16	Everything Happens to Me	3:26
4-17	Discussion	0:37
4-18	I Don't Want to Cry Any More	4:25
4-19	I Don't Want to Cry Any More	2:25
4-20	Discussion: I Don't Want to Cry Any More	5:32
4-21	Everything Happens to Me	3:00
4-22	Discussion	1:48
4-23	When You Are Away, Dear	1:40
4-24	Discussion	0:48
4-25	It Had to Be You	1:54
4-26	The Mood That I'm In	0:31
4-27	Gone with the Wind	1:36
4-28	I Got It Bad (and That Ain't Good)	3:17
4-29	Discussion	2:31
4-30	A Sunbonnet Blue	0:06
4-31	(I Don't Stand a) Ghost of a Chance	1:32
4-32	Discussion	2:14
4-33	I'm Walkin' Through Heaven with You	2:05
4-34	Discussion	0:42
4-35	Just Friends	1:01
4-36	The Nearness of You	1:04
4-37	Discussion	0:27
4-38	It's Too Hot for Words	0:21
4-39	They Say	2:25
4-40	I Won't Believe It	0:20
5-1	I Don't Want to Cry Any More (Take 1 – False start)	0:29
5-2	I Don't Want to Cry Any More (Take 2 – Master)	3:54
5-3	Studio Talk: Prelude to a Kiss (Take 1 – False start)	0:14
5-4	Studio Talk: Prelude to a Kiss (Take 2 – Incomplete)	0:50
5-5	Prelude to a Kiss (Take 3 – Master)	5:32
5-6	(I Don't Stand a) Ghost of a Chance	4:26
5-7	When Your Lover Has Gone (Take 1 – Incomplete)	0:49
5-8	Studio Talk: When Your Lover Has Gone (Take 3 – Master)	1:00
5-9	Studio Talk	0:22
5-10	When Your Lover Has Gone	4:55
5-11	Gone with the Wind	3:23
5-12	Studio Talk	0:10
5-13	Please Don't Talk About Me When I'm Gone	4:19
5-14	It Had to Be You	4:01
5-15	Studio Talk	0:08
5-16	Nice Work I You Can Get It	3:47
5-17	Come Rain or Come Shine	4:21
5-18	I Got a Right to Sing the Blues	5:51
5-19	What's New?	4:16
5-20	A Fine Romance (Take 1 – Incomplete)	0:46
5-21	A Fine Romance (Take 2 – Alternate)	2:44
5-22	A Fine Romance (Take 3 – False start)	0:18
5-23	A Fine Romance (Take 4 – Incomplete)	1:16
5-24	A Fine Romance (Take 5 – Incomplete)	3:18
5-25	A Fine Romance (Take 6 – False start)	0:26
5-26	A Fine Romance (Take 7 – Incomplete)	3:12
5-27	A Fine Romance (Take 8 – Master)	3:32
5-28	Studio Talk	0:06
5-29	I Hadn't Anyone Till You	4:03
6-1	I Get a Kick Out of You	5:39
6-2	Everything I Have Is Yours	4:29
6-3	Isn't This a Lovely Day	4:11
	1956 Los Angeles & New York Studio Sessions	
6-4	Discussion: Misery	1:26
6-5	Israel	2:18
6-6	Misery	4:40
6-7	Discussion	1:16
6-8	I Must Have That Man!	6:29
6-9	Discussion	0:27
6-10	Strange Fruit	5:48
6-11	Discussion: God Bless the Child	5:50
6-12	Discussion	1:16
6-13	God Bless the Child	3:15
6-14	God Bless the Child	1:08
6-15	Discussion	0:35
6-16	God Bless the Child	3:34
6-17	One Never Knows, Does One?	2:07
6-18	Discussion	2:00
6-19	Beer Barrel Polka (AKA "Roll Out the Barrel")	1:19
6-20	Some of These Days	1:03
6-21	A Yiddishe Momme	0:39
6-22	A Yiddishe Momme	2:16
6-23	Discussion	0:42
6-24	Lady's Back in Town	2:36
6-25	Discussion	4:33
6-26	Discussion	1:13
6-27	One Never Knows, Does One?	2:39
6-28	Discussion	1:19
6-29	(Unknown Title)	1:54
7-1	Travelin' Light	3:07
7-2	I Must Have That Man?	3:03
7-3	Some Other Spring	3:36
7-4	Lady Sings the Blues	3:44
7-5	Strange Fruit	3:01
7-6	God Bless the Child	3:58
7-7	Good Morning Heartache	3:29
7-8	No Good Man	3:18
7-9	Do Nothing 'till You Hear from Me	4:12
7-10	Cheek to Cheek	3:35
7-11	III Wind	6:14
7-12	Speak Low	4:25
7-13	We'll Be Together Again	4:24
7-14	All or Nothing at All	5:39
7-15	Sophisticated Lady	4:48
7-16	April in Paris	3:02
	1956 Carnegie Hall Concert, New York City: First Set	
8-1	Lady Sings the Blues (With Reading from Lady Sings the Blues)	2:52
8-2	Lady Sings the Blues	2:38
8-3	Ain't Nobody's Business If I Do	2:30
8-4	Travelin' Light (With Reading from Lady Sings the Blues)	0:44
8-5	Reading from Lady Sings the Blues	2:06
8-6	Billie's Blues (AKA "I Love My Man")	3:20
8-7	Body and Soul	2:39
8-8	Reading from Lady Sings the Blues	0:55
8-9	Don't Explain	2:26
	1956 Carnegie Hall Concert, New York City: Second Set	
8-10	Yesterdays	1:16
8-11	Please Don't Talk About Me When I'm Gone	1:43
8-12	I'll Be Seeing You	2:28
8-13	Reading from Lady Sings the Blues	2:50
8-14	My Man	3:13
8-15	I Cried for You	3:09
8-16	Fine and Mellow	3:15
8-17	I Cover the Waterfront	3:46
8-18	What a Little Moonlight Can Do	2:49
	1957 Los Angeles Studio Sessions	
8-19	I Wished on the Moon	3:25
8-20	Moonlight in Vermont	3:49
8-21	A Foggy Day	4:40
8-22	I Didn't Know What Time It Was (Stereo)	5:59
8-23	Just One of Those Things (Take 7 – Incomplete)	0:25
8-24	Studio Talk	0:47
8-25	Just One of Those Things (Take 8 – Master) (Stereo)	5:31
8-26	Studio Talk	0:29
8-27	Comes Love (Take 1 – Alternate)	3:58
8-28	Comes Love (Take 2 – False start)	0:38
8-29	Comes Love (Take 3 – False start)	0:18
8-30	Comes Love (Take 4 – Master)	4:00
9-1	Day In, Day Out (Stereo)	6:47
9-2	Darn That Dream	6:19
9-3	But Not for Me	3:48
9-4	Body and Soul	6:22
9-5	Studio Talk	0:45
9-6	Just Friends (Instrumental)	6:26
9-7	Studio Talk	0:16
9-8	Stars Fell on Alabama (Take 1 – Incomplete)	0:36
9-9	Stars Fell on Alabama (Take 2 – Master) (Stereo)	4:29
9-10	Studio Talk; Say It Isn't So (Take 1 – Incomplete)	0:24
9-11	Say It Isn't So (Take 2 – Master)	3:16
9-12	Studio Talk; Our Love Is Here to Stay (Take 1 – False start)	0:25
9-13	Our Love Is Here to Stay (Take 2 – Master)	3:42
9-14	Studio Talk; One for My Baby (And One More for the Road) (Take 1 – False start)	0:28
9-15	One for My Baby (And One More for the Road) (Take 2 – Incomplete)	1:56
9-16	One for My Baby (And One More for the Road) (Take 3 – Master) (Stereo)	5:39
9-17	They Can't Take That Away from Me	4:10
9-18	Embraceable You	6:47
9-19	Let's Call the Whole Thing Off	3:24
9-20	Gee Baby, Ain't Good to You?	5:38
	1957 Newport Jazz Festival Concert, Newport, Rhode Island	
10-1	Willis Conover Announcement	0:54
10-2	Johnny Mercer Announcement	0:42
10-3	Fanfare from "Oh, Lady Be Good"	0:11
10-4	Nice Work If You Can Get It	2:39
10-5	Willow Weep for Me	3:08
10-6	My Man	3:30
10-7	Lover, Come Back to Me	2:05
10-8	Lady Sings the Blues	3:00
10-9	What a Little Moonlight Can Do	2:54
10-10	Fanfare from "Oh, Lady Be Good" with Connover Announcement	0:18
	1958 the Seven Ages of Jazz Festival Concert, Wallingford, Connecticut	
10-11	Leonard Feather Announcement	0:47
10-12	I Wished on the Moon	2:43
10-13	Lover Man	3:01
	1959 New York Studio Sessions with Ray Ellis and His Orchestra (Stereo)	
10-14	All the Way	3:23
10-15	It's Not for Me to Say	2:26
10-16	I'll Never Smile Again	3:23
10-17	Just One More Chance	3:43
10-18	When It's Sleepy Time Down South	4:05
10-19	Don't Worry 'bout Me	3:08
10-20	Sometimes I'm Happy	2:46
10-21	You Took Advantage of Me	3:08
10-22	There'll Be Some Changes Made	2:52
10-23	'Deed I Do	2:13
10-24	All of You	2:30
10-25	Baby, Won't You Please Come Home?	3:03

== Personnel ==
=== Musicians ===
==== Tracks 1-1, 1-2 ====
- Billie Holiday – vocals
- Howard McGhee – trumpet
- Willie Smith – alto saxophone
- Wardell Gray, Charlie Ventura, Illinois Jacquet – tenor saxophone
- Dave Barbour – electric guitar
- Milt Raskin – piano
- Charles Mingus – bass
- Davie Coleman – drums

==== tracks: 1-3 to 1-5 ====
- Billie Holiday – vocals
- Buck Clayton – trumpet
- Coleman Hawkins, Lester Young, Illinois Jacquet – tenor saxophone
- Tiny Grimes, John Collins – electric guitar
- Ken Kersey – piano
- Curly Russell – bass
- J.C. Heard – drums

==== tracks: 1-6 to 1-9 ====
- Billie Holiday – vocals
- Joe Guy – trumpet
- Georgie Auld – alto saxophone
- Lester Young, Illinois Jacquet – tenor saxophone
- Tiny Grimes – electric guitar
- Ken Kersey – piano
- Al McKibbon – bass
- J.C. Heard – drums

==== tracks: 1-10, 1-11 ====
- Billie Holiday – vocals
- Howard McGhee – trumpet
- Trummy Young – trombone
- Illinois Jacquet – tenor saxophone
- Barney Kessel – electric guitar
- Ken Kersey – piano
- Charlie Drayton – bass
- Jackie Mills – drums

==== tracks: 1-12 to 1-17 ====
- Billie Holiday – vocals
- Bobby Tucker – piano

==== tracks: 1-18 to 2-8 ====
- Billie Holiday – vocals
- Charlie Shavers – trumpet
- Flip Phillips – tenor saxophone
- Barney Kessel – electric guitar
- Oscar Peterson – piano
- Ray Brown – bass
- Alvin Stoller – drums

==== tracks: 2-9 to 2-14 ====
- Billie Holiday – vocals
- Joe Newman – trumpet
- Paul Quinichette – tenor saxophone
- Freddie Green – guitar
- Oscar Peterson – piano
- Ray Brown – bass
- Gus Johnson – drums

==== tracks: 2-15 to 2-22 ====
- Billie Holiday – vocals
- Carl Drinkard – piano
- Red Mitchell – bass
- Elaine Leighton – drums

==== tracks: 2-23 to 3-1 ====
- Billie Holiday – vocals
- Buddy DeFranco – clarinet
- Jimmy Raney – electric guitar
- Red Norvo – vibraphone
- Sonny Clark, Beryl Booker – piano
- Red Mitchell – bass
- Elaine Leighton – drums

==== tracks: 3-2 to 3-4 ====
- Billie Holiday – vocals
- Charlie Shavers – trumpet
- Herb Ellis – electric guitar
- Oscar Peterson – piano
- Ray Brown – bass
- Ed Shaughnessy – drums

==== tracks: 3-5 to 3-11 ====
- Billie Holiday – vocals
- Harry "Sweets" Edison – trumpet
- Willie Smith – alto saxophone
- Barney Kessel – electric guitar
- Bobby Tucker – piano
- Red Callender – bass
- Chico Hamilton – drums

==== tracks: 3-12 to 3-18 ====
- Billie Holiday – vocals
- Charlie Shavers – trumpet
- Tony Scott – clarinet
- Budd Johnson – tenor saxophone
- Billy Bauer – electric guitar
- Billy Taylor – piano
- Leonard Gaskin – bass
- Cozy Cole – drums

==== tracks: 4-1 to 4-40 ====
- Billie Holiday – vocals
- Jimmy Rowles – piano
- Artie Shapiro – bass

==== tracks: 5-1 to 6-3 ====
- Billie Holiday – vocals
- Harry "Sweets" Edison – trumpet
- Benny Carter – alto saxophone
- Barney Kessel – electric guitar
- Jimmy Rowles – piano
- John Simmons – bass
- Larry Bunker – drums

==== tracks: 6-4 to 6-29 ====
- Billie Holiday – vocals
- Tony Scott – piano

==== tracks: 7-1 to 7-8 ====
- Billie Holiday – vocals
- Charlie Shavers – trumpet
- Tony Scott – clarinet
- Paul Quinichette – tenor saxophone
- Kenny Burrell – electric guitar
- Wynton Kelly, Jimmy Rowles – piano
- Aaron Bell – bass
- Lennie McBrowne – drums

==== tracks: 7-9 to 7-12 ====
- Billie Holiday – vocals
- Harry "Sweets" Edison – trumpet
- Ben Webster – tenor saxophone
- Barney Kessel – electric guitar
- Jimmy Rowles – piano
- Joe Mondragon – bass
- Alvin Stoller – drums

==== tracks: 7-13 to 7-16 ====
- Billie Holiday – vocals
- Harry "Sweets" Edison – trumpet
- Ben Webster – tenor saxophone
- Barney Kessel – electric guitar
- Jimmy Rowles – piano
- Red Mitchell – bass
- Alvin Stoller – drums

==== tracks: 8-1 to 8-9 ====
- Billie Holiday – vocals
- Roy Eldridge – trumpet
- Coleman Hawkins – tenor saxophone
- Kenny Burrell – electric guitar
- Tony Scott, Carl Drinkard – piano
- Carson Smith – bass
- Chico Hamilton – drums

==== tracks: 8-10 to 8-18 ====
- Billie Holiday – vocals
- Buck Clayton – trumpet
- Tony Scott – clarinet
- Al Cohn – tenor saxophone
- Kenny Burrell – electric guitar
- Carl Drinkard – piano
- Carson Smith – bass
- Chico Hamilton – drums

==== tracks: 8-19 to 9-16 ====
- Billie Holiday – vocals
- Harry "Sweets" Edison – trumpet
- Ben Webster – tenor saxophone
- Barney Kessel – electric guitar
- Jimmy Rowles – piano
- Red Mitchell – bass
- Alvin Stoller – drums

==== tracks: 9-17 to 9-20 ====
- Billie Holiday – vocals
- Harry "Sweets" Edison – trumpet
- Ben Webster – tenor saxophone
- Barney Kessel – electric guitar
- Jimmy Rowles – piano
- Red Mitchell – bass
- Larry Bunker – drums

==== tracks: 10-1 to 10-10 ====
- Billie Holiday – vocals
- Mal Waldron – piano
- Joe Benjamin – bass
- Jo Jones – drums

==== tracks: 10-11 to 10-13 ====
- Billie Holiday – vocals
- Buck Clayton – trumpet
- Coleman Hawkins, Georgie Auld – tenor saxophone
- Mal Waldron – piano
- Milt Hinton – bass
- Don Lamond – drums

==== tracks: 10-14 to 10-17 ====
- Billie Holiday – vocals
- Ray Ellis – conductor, arranger
  - Jimmy Cleveland – trombone
  - Romeo Penque – bass clarinet, alto saxophone
  - Romeo Penque – tenor saxophone
  - Kenny Burrell – electric guitar
  - Janet Putnam – harp
  - Hank Jones – piano
  - Joe Benjamin – bass
  - Osie Johnson – drums

==== tracks: 10-18 to 10-21 ====
- Billie Holiday – vocals
- Ray Ellis – conductor, arranger
  - Harry "Sweets" Edison – trumpet
  - Jimmy Cleveland – trombone
  - Gene Quill – alto saxophone
  - Barry Galbraith – electric guitar
  - Hank Jones – piano
  - Milt Hinton – bass
  - Osie Johnson – drums

==== tracks: 10-22 to 10-25 ====
- Billie Holiday – vocals
- Ray Ellis – conductor, arranger
  - Harry "Sweets" Edison, Joe Wilder – trumpet
  - Billy Byers – trombone
  - Al Cohn – tenor saxophone
  - Danny Bank – baritone saxophone
  - Barry Galbraith – electric guitar
  - Hank Jones – piano
  - Milt Hinton – bass
  - Osie Johnson – drums

=== Technical personnel ===
- Norman Granz (Original Mercury, Clef and Verve Sessions), Leonard Feather (The Seven Ages of Jazz Concert), Leroy Lovett (2/14/55 Clef Session), Tony Scott (6/6/56 and 6/7/56 Verve Sessions), Ray Ellis (MGM Studio Sessions) – producer
- Bob Porter, Creed Taylor, Jackie Mills, Norman Granz – technician [Concert Recordings First Prepared for Release]
- Andrew Nicholas, Joseph M. Palmaccio, Patrick Ryan, Rick Rowe, Suha Gur, Thomas "Curly" Ruff – digital engineering
- Phil Schaap – producer, remastering, rehearsal editing, restoration, research
- David Lau – design
- Peter Pullman – booklet editor
  - Cliff Preiss, Matthew Brown – assistance
- Joel E. Siegel – interviewer
- Joel E. Siegel, Phil Schaap, Bob Porter, Buck Clayton – liner notes
- Herman Leonard, Chuck Stewart, Bob Parent, Robin Carson, Paul J. Hoeffler, Jimmy Rowles, Nancy Miller Elliott, Frank Driggs Collection, Ray Avery Collection, Verve Records Files – photography
