= Body and Soul (Billie Holiday album) =

Studio album by Billie Holiday
- Released: 1957
- Recorded: January 3–4, 7, 9, 1957
- Studios: Capitol Studios; Hollywood, CA
- Genre: Jazz
- Length: 40:07
- Label: Verve
- Producer: Norman Granz

Billie Holiday chronology
Lady Sings the Blues (1956)	Body and Soul (1957)	Songs for Distingué Lovers (1957)

Professional ratings
Review scores
Source	Rating
AllMusic	3/5 stars
The Encyclopedia of Popular Music	3/5 stars
The Penguin Guide to Jazz Recordings	3.5/4 stars
The New Rolling Stone Album Guide	3.5/5 stars

Body and Soul is the seventh studio album by jazz singer Billie Holiday, released in 1957.

== Critical reception ==
In its 1957 review of the album, Saturday Review wrote:

"With changes in her voice which bring Miss Holiday's singing closer to recitative has come an occasional timidity about altering a melody where before there was boldness. But she remains one of the best jazz singers, not only for her unique sound and attack, but for her straightforward, honest, musical communication."

== Track listing ==
A side

1. "Body and Soul" (Johnny Green, Edward Heyman, Robert Sour, and Frank Eyton) – 6:18
2. "They Can't Take That Away From Me" (George and Ira Gershwin) – 4:08
3. "Darn That Dream" (Jimmy Van Heusen and Eddie DeLange) – 6:15
4. "Let's Call The Whole Thing Off" (George and Ira Gershwin) – 3:22

B side

1. "Comes Love" (Sam H. Stept, Lew Brown and Charles Tobias) – 3:58
2. "Gee Baby, Ain't I Good to You" (Andy Razaf and Don Redman) – 5:34
3. "Embraceable You" (George and Ira Gershwin) – 6:45
4. "Moonlight in Vermont" (Karl Suessdorf and John Blackburn)- 3:47

bonus tracks on 2002 Verve Master Edition CD

1. "Comes Love" (false start take 2) - 0:32
2. "Comes Love" (false start take 3) - 0:20
3. "Comes Love" (alternate take 1) - 3:56

== Personnel ==
- Billie Holiday – vocals
- Ben Webster – Tenor Sax
- Barney Kessel – Guitar
- Harry "Sweets" Edison – Trumpet
- Jimmy Rowles – Piano
- Red Mitchell – Bass
- Alvin Stoller – Drums on 1, 3, 5 and 8
- Larry Bunker – Drums on 2, 4, 6 and 7
