= Songs for Distingué Lovers =

1958 studio album by Billie Holiday

Studio album by Billie Holiday
- Released: 1958
- Recorded: January 1957
- Studios: Capitol Studios; Hollywood, CA
- Genres: Jazz, vocal jazz
- Length: 33:04
- Label: Verve
- Producer: Norman Granz

Billie Holiday chronology
Body and Soul (1957)	Songs for Distingué Lovers (1958)	Stay with Me (1958)

Professional ratings
Review scores
Source	Rating
AllMusic	3/5 stars
The Encyclopedia of Popular Music	5/5 stars
The Penguin Guide to Jazz Recordings	4/4 stars
The New Rolling Stone Album Guide	3.5/5 stars
Tom Hull – on the Web	A−

Songs for Distingué Lovers is the eighth studio album by jazz singer Billie Holiday, released in 1958 on Verve Records. It was originally available in both mono (catalogue number MGV 8257) and stereo (catalog number MGVS 6021). It was recorded at Capitol Studios in Los Angeles from January 3 to January 9, 1957, and produced by Norman Granz.

== Content ==
Granz and Holiday chose familiar items from the Great American Songbook of classic pop for the album, Holiday singing in the context comfortable for her, that of a small jazz band. The original album consisted of six standards, five of which by songwriters who would be categorically tackled by Ella Fitzgerald on her Songbooks series. The sessions reunited Holiday with trumpeter Harry Edison and saxophonist Ben Webster, both of whom the singer had worked with during the 1930 and 1940s, Edison as a member of the Count Basie Orchestra during her brief stay as the band's female singer, and Webster from the recordings under her own name for Vocalion Records and Okeh Records.

== Reissue ==
Songs for Distingué Lovers was reissued by Verve Records on October 28, 1997, as part of its Master Edition series, remastering using 20-bit technology, with six bonus tracks. The extra tracks were all recorded at the same sessions, and taken from other Holiday albums of the late 1950s on Verve. "I Wished on the Moon" and "Love Is Here to Stay" were from MGV 8329, All or Nothing At All, and the other four from MGV 8197, Body and Soul.

== Track listing ==
Side one

1. "Day In, Day Out" (Johnny Mercer, Rube Bloom) – 6:47
2. "A Foggy Day" (Ira Gershwin, George Gershwin) – 4:40
3. "Stars Fell on Alabama" (Frank Perkins, Mitchell Parish) – 4:28

Side two

1. "One For My Baby (And One More For The Road)" (Harold Arlen, Johnny Mercer) - 5:37
2. "Just One of Those Things" (Cole Porter) – 5:31
3. "I Didn't Know What Time It Was" (Lorenz Hart, Richard Rodgers) – 5:59

Bonus tracks 1997 reissue

1. "Let's Call the Whole Thing Off" (Ira Gershwin, George Gershwin) – 3:23
2. "I Wished on the Moon" (Dorothy Parker, Ralph Rainger) – 3:25
3. "They Can't Take That Away From Me" (Ira Gershwin, George Gershwin) – 4:10
4. "Body and Soul" (Johnny Green, Frank Eyton, Edward Heyman, Robert Sour) – 6:22
5. "Moonlight in Vermont" (Karl Suessdorf, John Blackburn) – 3:49
6. "Love Is Here to Stay" (Ira Gershwin, George Gershwin) – 3:41

== Personnel ==
- Billie Holiday - vocal
- Harry Edison - trumpet
- Ben Webster - tenor saxophone
- Jimmy Rowles - piano
- Barney Kessel - guitar
- Red Mitchell - double bass, on One-1-2 and Two-3 and Bonus
- Alvin Stoller - drums, on One-1-2 and Two-3 and Bonus
- Joe Mondragon - double bass, on One-5 and Two-3-4-5
- Larry Bunker - drums, on One-3 and Two-1-2

== Charts ==
=== Weekly charts ===
Chart (2023)	Peak position
UK Jazz & Blues Albums (OCC)	8
