= Music for Torching with Billie Holiday =

Studio album by Billie Holiday
- Released: October 1955
- Recorded: August 23 & August 25, 1955
- Studios: Los Angeles, CA
- Genres: Jazz, swing
- Length: 33:48
- Labels: Clef; MG C-669
- Producer: Norman Granz

Billie Holiday chronology
Billie Holiday at JATP (1954)	Music for Torching with Billie Holiday (1955)	Velvet Mood (1956)

Music for Torching with Billie Holiday is the fourth studio album by jazz singer Billie Holiday. A collection of torch songs, it was released in 1955 by Clef Records. It is her first 12-inch LP for the label, after four 10 inch LPs.

The music was recorded over the course of two sessions in Los Angeles, two days apart, which also resulted in all the material for her follow-up album Velvet Mood (MG C-713).

Professional ratings
Review scores
Source	Rating
AllMusic	3/5 stars
DownBeat	5/5 stars
The Encyclopedia of Popular Music	3/5 stars
The Penguin Guide to Jazz Recordings	3.5/4 stars

== Track listing ==
=== Side A ===
1. "It Had to Be You" (Isham Jones, Gus Kahn) – 4:02
2. "Come Rain or Come Shine" (Harold Arlen, Johnny Mercer) – 4:23
3. "I Don't Want to Cry Anymore" (Victor Schertzinger) – 3:55
4. "I Don't Stand a Ghost of a Chance with You" (Victor Young, Ned Washington, Bing Crosby) – 4:29

=== Side B ===
1. "A Fine Romance" (Jerome Kern, Dorothy Fields) – 3:35
2. "Gone with the Wind" (Allie Wrubel, Herb Magidson) – 3:26
3. "I Get a Kick Out of You" (Cole Porter) – 5:42
4. "Isn't This a Lovely Day?" (Irving Berlin) – 4:16

== Personnel ==
- Billie Holiday – vocals
- Harry "Sweets" Edison – trumpet
- Benny Carter – alto & tenor saxophone
- Jimmy Rowles – piano
- Barney Kessel – guitar
- John Simmons – bass
- Larry Bunker – drums
