= Our Love Is Different =

Single by Billie Holiday
- B-side: "Swing, Brother, Swing"
- Recorded: July 5, 1939
- Genre: Jazz
- Label: Vocalion
- Songwriter(s): Billie Holiday, R. Conway, Basil G. Alba, and Sonny White

"Our Love Is Different" is a song written by Billie Holiday, R. Conway, Basil G. Alba, and Sonny White

== Recording session ==
Session #37: New York City, July 5, 1939, Billie Holiday & Her Orchestra, with Charlie Shavers (trumpet), Tab Smith (alto saxophone), Kenneth Hollon, Stanley Payne (tenor saxophone), Sonny White (piano), Bernard Addison (guitar), John Williams (bass), Eddie Dougherty (drums), Billie Holiday (vocals)
