= Wesley Wilson =

American singer (1893–1958)

- Also known as: Kid Wilson, Jenkins, Socks, Sox (or Socks) Wilson
- Born: Wesley Shellie Wilson; October 1, 1893; Jacksonville, Florida, United States
- Died: October 10, 1958 (aged 65) Cape May Court House, New Jersey, United States
- Genres: Blues, jazz
- Occupations: Musician, songwriter
- Instruments: Vocals, piano, organ
- Years active: 1900s–1940s
- Labels: Paramount, various

Wesley Shellie Wilson (October 1, 1893 – October 10, 1958), often credited as Kid Wilson, was an American blues and jazz singer and songwriter. His stagecraft and performances with his wife and musical partner, Coot Grant, were popular with African American audiences in the 1910s, 1920s and early 1930s.

His stage names included Kid Wilson, Jenkins, Socks, and Sox (or Socks) Wilson. His musical excursions included participation in the duo of Pigmeat Pete and Catjuice Charlie. His recordings include the songs "Blue Monday on Sugar Hill" and "Rasslin' till the Wagon Comes".

== Biography ==
Wilson was born and raised in Jacksonville, Florida. He played the piano and organ, and his wife and musical partner, Coot Grant, played the guitar and sang and danced.

The duo was variously billed as Grant and Wilson, Kid and Coot, and Hunter and Jenkins, as they appeared and later record with Fletcher Henderson, Mezz Mezzrow, Sidney Bechet, and Louis Armstrong. Their variety was such that they performed separately and together in vaudeville, musical comedies, revues and traveling shows. They also appeared in the film The Emperor Jones (1933), starring Paul Robeson.

Wilson and Grant wrote more than 400 songs during their career, including "Gimme a Pigfoot" (1933) and "Take Me for a Buggy Ride" (both of which were recorded by Bessie Smith) and "Find Me at the Greasy Spoon (If You Miss Me Here)" (1925) and "Prince of Wails" for Fletcher Henderson. Their own renditions included such diverse titles as "Come on Coot, Do That Thing" (1925), "Dem Socks Dat My Pappy Wore", and the unreleased "Throat Cutting Blues".

Grant and Wilson's act, once seen as a rival of Butterbeans and Susie, began to lose favor with the public by the middle of the 1930s, but they recorded again in 1938.

Their only child, Bobby Wilson, was born in 1941.

By 1946, after Mezz Mezzrow had founded his King Jazz record label, he engaged them as songwriters. This association led to their final recording session, in 1946, backed by a quintet including Bechet and Mezzrow. Wilson retired in ill health shortly thereafter, but Grant continued performing into the 1950s. In January 1953, one commentator noted that the couple had moved from New York City to Los Angeles and were in considerable financial hardship.

Wilson died of a stroke at the age of 65 in October 1958 in Cape May Court House, New Jersey.

== Selected songs composed by Wilson ==
| Song title | Recorded by |
|---|---|
| "All the Time" | LaVern Baker |
| "Blue Monday on Sugar Hill" | Sidney Bechet, Charlie Shavers |
| "Chicky-Mo, Craney-Crow" | Louis Jordan |
| "De Laff's on You" | Louis Jordan |
| "Do You Call That a Buddy?" | Louis Armstrong, Louis Jordan, Carl Weathersby, B.B. King, Dr. John |
| "Do Your Duty" | Bessie Smith, Billie Holiday, Buck Clayton, Rory Block, Saffire – The Uppity Blues Women |
| "I'm Down in the Dumps" | Bessie Smith, Jack Teagarden, Rory Block, Valerie Wellington |
| "Ghost of Yesterday" | Billie Holiday |
| "Gimme a Pigfoot" (variously recorded as titled "Gimme a Pigfoot (and a Bottle of Beer))" | Bessie Smith, Billie Holiday, Nina Simone, Abbey Lincoln, Count Basie, Bobby Short, Judith Durham |
| "It's Full or It Ain't No Good" | Louis Jordan, Billie Holiday, Rory Block, Saffire – The Uppity Blues Women |
| "Prince of Wails" | Fletcher Henderson |
| "Somebody Done Hoodooed the Hoodoo Man" | Louis Jordan |
| "Take Me for a Buggy Ride" | Bessie Smith |
| "Toot It, Brother Armstrong" | Sidney Bechet |
| "Uncle Joe" | Sidney Bechet |
