= Charlie Drayton =

American musician

Charles Henderson Drayton (5 May 1919 Brooklyn, New York – 31 July 1953 Los Angeles) was an American jazz bassist who performed and recorded from the late 1930s until his death.

== Career ==
Drayton performed with artists that include Louis Jordan, Benny Carter, Dizzy Gillespie, Pete Brown, Ben Webster, Joan Edwards, Timmie Rogers, Savannah Churchill, the Basin Street Boys, Barney Bigard, Billie Holiday, Coleman Hawkins, Woody Herman, Julia Lee, Jack Teagarden, Louis Armstrong, Fletcher Henderson, Russell Jacquet, Marion Abernathy, The Treniers, Billy Taylor, Helen Humes, and Teddy Bunn. In 1946, he played several times with artists at Jazz at the Philharmonic.

Drayton's performances — including the known fifty-two jazz recording sessions from 1938 to 1953 — with artists at the vanguard of bebop during the height of its development, placed him in the flow of many historic settings in jazz that marked the careers of musicians. In one such setting, Drayton was the bassist for Ben Webster's first recording session — February 8, 1944, World Broadcasting Systems, New York City — with Hot Lips Page (trumpet), Clyde Hart (piano), Denzil Best (drums). That session has been released multiple times. A 1993 release on CD is titled The Horn, by Progressive Records.

== Family ==
Drayton was born May 5, 1919, in Brooklyn to George Leslie Drayton (1889–1946) and Albertha Eugena Bynoe (1885–1979). Both parents were born in Bridgetown, Barbados, and immigrated to the United States from Barbados – both arriving in the Port of New York in 1907. Drayton arrived June 7, 1907, aboard the SS Parima and Bynoe arrived October 29, 1907, aboard the SS Soldier Prince. They married in Manhattan October 24, 1912.

Charlie Drayton married Lois Ola Robinson (maiden; 1922–1997), who had been Pearl Bailey's hairdresser. Lois' brother, "Red" Minor William Robinson (1920–2008), was a Los Angeles-based jazz drummer. One of their sons, Bernard "Bernie" Drayton (born 1941), is a studio audio engineer and producer of recording artists and jingles. He was the audio engineer of John Coltrane's last recording, April 23, 1967, The Olatunji Concert: The Last Live Recording. Another son, Leslie Clem Drayton (born 1950), is a professional trumpet player and arranger in the Los Angeles area who also has been an advisor to the Live Music Movement Foundation since its inception in 2011. Leslie was a founding member of Earth, Wind & Fire.

Charlie Drayton's grandson, Charley Drayton (born 1965), is a drummer.

== Death ==
Drayton's death certificate states that he died at the Los Angeles County General Hospital after an apparent suicide attempt from strychnine poisoning, which he had ingested at his home in South Park neighborhood of Los Angeles at 451 East 48th Street.
