= Nina Never Knew =

Song
- Published: 1952
- Composer(s): Louis Alter
- Lyricist(s): Milton Drake

"Nina Never Knew" is a popular song with music by Louis Alter and lyrics by Milton Drake, published in 1952.

Recordings that charted in 1952 were by the Sauter-Finegan Orchestra on RCA Victor Records (number 13 on the Billboard charts; first entered on December 20) and by Johnny Desmond on Coral Records (number 19; first entered on November 1).

== Recorded versions ==
- Jonny Abeles
- Kenny Ball
- Tony Brent
- Les Brown
- Budapest Radio Orchestra
- Vic Damone
- Johnny Desmond
- Barry Galbraith
- Bill Easley
- Chuck Hedges
- Eddie Higgins
- Jack Jones
- Steve Jordan
- King Sisters - Warm And Wonderful
- Matt Monro - Here's To My Lady
- Joe Mooney
- John Pizzarelli
- Johnny Richards
- Jimmy Rowles
- Sauter-Finegan Orchestra
- George Shearing
- Frank Sinatra
- The Singers Unlimited
- Nancy Wilson
