= Everything Happens for the Best =

"Everything Happens For The Best"

Single by Billie Holiday
- A-side: "Under a Blue Jungle Moon"
- Recorded: March 21, 1939
- Genre: Jazz
- Label: Vocalion
- Songwriter(s): Billie Holiday

"Everything Happens For The Best" is a song written by Billie Holiday.

== Recording session ==
Session #35: New York, March 21, 1939 on the Vocalion label, Billie Holiday & Her Orchestra with ‘Hot Lips’ Page (trumpet), Tab Smith, Kenneth Hollon, Stanley Payne (saxophone), Kenny Kersey (piano), Jimmy McLin (guitar), John Williams (bass) Eddie Dougherty (drums), Billie Holiday (vocals).

The lyrics were written by Scott Billington and Lindsay Ellison.
