= Preacher Boy =

Single by Billie Holiday
- Recorded: Never
- Genre: Jazz
- Songwriter(s): Billie Holiday; Mal Waldron

"Preacher Boy" is a jazz song written by singer Billie Holiday, and composer Jeanne Burns and published by E.B. Marks. This is one of seven songs written by or co-written by Holiday that she never recorded.

According to Holiday, she wrote the song as a tribute to her second husband, Louis McKay. Holiday met McKay's family in December 1951 and recalled: "His mother, she's eighty years old and she had this dog and she loved this dog so much. The dog died and he preached over the dog. One day, we were walking down the street (in his home town) and somebody says 'Hey Preach! Hey Preach! What's the matter? You don't know me anymore, man?' Well I asked Louis what he was talking about and he said 'he's talking about me,' so that's how I learned the story." The song was published by E.B. Marks, but she never recorded it.
