= The Lady Sings =

Compilation album by Billie Holiday
- Released: 1956
- Recorded: 1945, 1946, 1947, 1949, 1950
- Genre: Vocal jazz
- Label: Decca
- Producer: Milt Gabler

Billie Holiday chronology
Velvet Mood (1956)	The Lady Sings (1956)	Lady Sings the Blues (1956)

Professional ratings
Review scores
Source	Rating
AllMusic	4.5/5 stars
The Encyclopedia of Popular Music	4/5 stars
New Record Mirror	4/5 stars

The Lady Sings (DL 8215) is the debut compilation album by jazz singer Billie Holiday, released by Decca Records in 1956. The featured songs on the album are from when Holiday was signed with Decca in the mid to late 1940s. By the time this album was released, she was on Norman Granz's jazz label Verve Records.

== Track listing ==
=== Side one ===
1. "Deep Song" (George Cory, Douglass Cross) - 3:13
2. "You Better Go Now" (Irvin Graham, S. Bickley Reichner) - 2:36
3. "Don't Explain" (Billie Holiday, Arthur Herzog Jr.) - 3:24
4. "Ain't Nobody's Business If I Do" (Porter Grainger, Everett Robbins) - 3:20
5. "God Bless the Child" (Billie Holiday, Arthur Herzog Jr.) - 3:09
6. "Them There Eyes" (Maceo Pinkard, Doris Tauber, William Tracey) - 2:52

=== Side two ===
1. "Good Morning Heartache" (Irene Higginbotham, Ervin Drake, Dan Fisher) - 3:08
2. "No More" (Tutti Camarata, Bob Russell) - 2:48
3. "No Good Man" (Irene Higginbotham, Dan Fisher, Sammy Gallop) - 3:08
4. "I'll Look Around" (George Cory, Douglass Cross) - 3:16
5. "Easy Living (Ralph Rainger, Leo Robin) - 3:13
6. "What Is This Thing Called Love? (Cole Porter) - 3:05
