= Stormy Blues =

1954 single by Billie Holiday

Single by Billie Holiday
- A-side: "Willow Weep for Me"
- Recorded: September 3, 1954
- Genre: Blues
- Label: Verve Records
- Songwriter: Billie Holiday

"Stormy Blues" is a song written by Billie Holiday

== Recording session ==
Session #71: Los Angeles, September 3, 1954 Verve records, Billie Holiday & Her Orchestra with Harry "Sweets" Edison (trumpet), Willie Smith (alto saxophone), Bobby Tucker (piano), Barney Kessel (guitar), Red Callender (bass), Chico Hamilton (drums), Billie Holiday (vocals)
