= Gimme a Pigfoot =

Single by Bessie Smith
- B-side: "Take Me For a Buggy Ride"
- Recorded: November 24, 1933
- Genre: Blues
- Length: 3:29
- Label: OKeh
- Songwriter(s): Wesley Wilson; Coot Grant (uncredited)
- Producer(s): John Hammond

"Gimme a Pigfoot" is a 1933 song written by Wesley Wilson, probably with Coot Grant, his wife, though she is not usually credited on record labels. It was first recorded by Bessie Smith, and versions have been released by many other artists. It is sometimes listed as "Gimme a Pigfoot (And a Bottle of Beer)".

Bessie Smith recorded the song in New York on November 24, 1933, with a band led by pianist Buck Washington. The musicians were Washington (piano), Benny Goodman (clarinet), Frankie Newton (trumpet), Jack Teagarden (trombone), Chu Berry (tenor saxophone), Bobby Johnson (guitar), and Billy Taylor (bass). The recording was organised and produced by John Hammond, and it proved to be Smith's final recording session before her death in 1937. The recording was released by OKeh Records in early 1934.

The song's lyrics contrast the aspirations of those partying "up in Harlem every Saturday night, when the highbrows get together", with simpler pleasures: "At the break of day/ You can hear ol' Hannah say/ 'Gimme a pigfoot and a bottle of beer/ Send me again, I don't care/ I feel just like I wanna clown." A "pigfoot", or pig's trotter, is a foodstuff often associated stereotypically with black Americans frequenting juke joints.

Later recordings of the song include those by Frankie "Half Pint" Jaxon (1940), Billie Holiday (1950), LaVern Baker (1958), and Nina Simone (1966).
