= Comes Love =

Song by Judy Canova in Yokel Boy
- Published: 1939
- Genre: Jazz standard
- Composer: Sam H. Stept
- Lyricists: Lew Brown, Charles Tobias

"Comes Love" is a 1939 jazz standard. It was composed by Sam H. Stept, with lyrics by Lew Brown and Charles Tobias. It was featured in the Broadway musical Yokel Boy, starring Phil Silvers and Buddy Ebsen, where it was introduced by Judy Canova.

== Notable recordings ==
- The Andrews Sisters
- Suzy Bogguss
- Rosemary Clooney
- Sam Cooke
- Sammy Davis Jr.
- Dan Hicks
- Billie Holiday
- Harry James
- Rickie Lee Jones
- Stacey Kent
- Irene Kral
- Diana Krall
- Dorothy Lamour
- Claire Martin
- Carmen McRae
- Joni Mitchell
- Sarah Vaughan

== Other appearances ==
- In the Castle episode "The Blue Butterfly", this song is performed by actress Tamala Jones, playing the character of Betsy Sinclair, in a 1940s setting.
- In The Sopranos’ season six premier, "Members Only,” “Comes Love” plays on Uncle Junior's record player as he shoots Tony in the stomach.

== See also ==
- List of jazz standards
