= Billie Holiday (album) =

Studio album by Billie Holiday
- Released: 1954
- Recorded: April 1952 & April 14, 1954
- Genre: Vocal jazz
- Length: 24:53
- Label: Clef (Verve)
- Producer: Norman Granz

Billie Holiday chronology
An Evening with Billie Holiday (1953)	Billie Holiday (1954)	Billie Holiday at JATP (1954)

Professional ratings
Review scores
Source	Rating
AllMusic	3/5 stars
Down Beat (1954 Review)	5/5 stars

Billie Holiday is the third studio album by jazz singer Billie Holiday, released on Clef Records in 1954. The recordings took place in 1952 and 1954. Her final album would also be given the same title, prior to being changed to Last Recording instead.

== Content ==
In a 1954 review, Down Beat magazine praises the album, saying:

"The set is an experience in mounting pleasure that can do anything but increase still further no matter how often the LP is replayed. As for comparing it with earlier Teddy Wilson-Billie sessions, what's the point? Count your blessings in having both. Speaking of time, Billie's beat and variations thereon never cease to be among the seven wonders of jazz."

Two recordings, "What a Little Moonlight Can Do" and "I Cried for You" were also recorded by Holiday in the 1930s with Teddy Wilson's band, at the beginning of her career.

In 1956, when the 10-inch format was phased out, Clef reissued the contents of this album on two different newly released 12 inch compilation LPs. Five songs (tracks A1-B1) were added to A Recital By Billie Holiday, and the other three (tracks B2-B4) were added to Solitude.

== Track listing ==
A side

1. "Love for Sale" (Cole Porter) – 2:56
2. "Moonglow" (Eddie DeLange, Will Hudson, Irving Mills) – 2:58
3. "Everything I Have Is Yours" (Harold Adamson, Burton Lane) – 3:43
4. "If the Moon Turns Green" (George Cates, Bernie Hanighen) – 2:46

B side

1. "Autumn in New York" (Vernon Duke) – 3:43
2. "How Deep Is the Ocean?" (Irving Berlin) – 3:00
3. "What a Little Moonlight Can Do" (Harry M. Woods) – 3:14
4. "I Cried for You" (Gus Arnheim, Arthur Freed, Abe Lyman) – 2:27

== Personnel ==
=== April 1952 recordings ===
(Tracks A1–B1)
The exact date of this session is not known. Norman Granz signed Holiday to his record label after returning from Europe on April 21, 1952, so the session presumably occurred sometime after that.

- Billie Holiday, vocals
- Flip Phillips, tenor sax
- Charlie Shavers, trumpet
- Oscar Peterson, piano
- Barney Kessel, guitar
- Alvin Stoller, drums
- Ray Brown, bass

=== April 14, 1954 recordings ===
(Tracks B2-B4)

- Billie Holiday, vocals
- Charlie Shavers, trumpet
- Oscar Peterson, piano
- Herb Ellis, guitar
- Ed Shaughnessy, drums
- Ray Brown, bass
