= She's Funny That Way =

1929 popular song

Sheet music, 1928

"She's Funny That Way" or "He's Funny That Way" is a popular song, composed by Neil Moret, with lyrics by Richard Whiting. It was composed for the short film Gems of MGM in 1929 for Marion Harris, but the film was not released until 1931. Harris sang it as "I'm Funny That Way" in the 1929 film Mother's Boy. In an interview with Will Friedwald, broadcast on KSDS, Whiting's daughter, the singer Margaret Whiting, recounted that her father's lyric started out life as a poem in tribute to his wife Eleanor Youngblood Whiting. A friend, also a composer, told him it sounded like a great lyric, and encouraged him to find someone to compose the melody. Although a highly regarded composer himself, he chose Moret.

A torch song, according to Philip Furia and Michael Lasser, the "song begins self-deprecatingly—'I'm not much to look at, I'm nothing to see'—but "at the end of each chorus, it affirms the lover's good fortune: 'I've got a woman crazy 'bout me, she's funny that way'". They state that it is unusual as the song was written from a man's point of view, whereas most torch songs are written from the female perspective about a man who betrayed or abused the woman.

Ted Lewis's recording was popular in 1929. The song has generally been more covered by female artists as "He's Funny That Way". Thelma Carpenter recorded it in the 1930s at the age of 19, "handling the vocal like a seasoned veteran" according to Dave Oliphant, but it is most associated with Billie Holiday, who first recorded it in 1937. Holiday later featured it on her 1953 album An Evening with Billie Holiday.

Bob Dylan sang the song as “He’s Funny That Way” on the 2018 compilation album Universal Love: Wedding Songs Reimagined, a collection of same-sex wedding songs.

The composition was copyrighted in 1928, and entered the American public domain on January 1, 2024. (Note: Under R157701)
