= Louis Alter =

American pianist, songwriter and composer

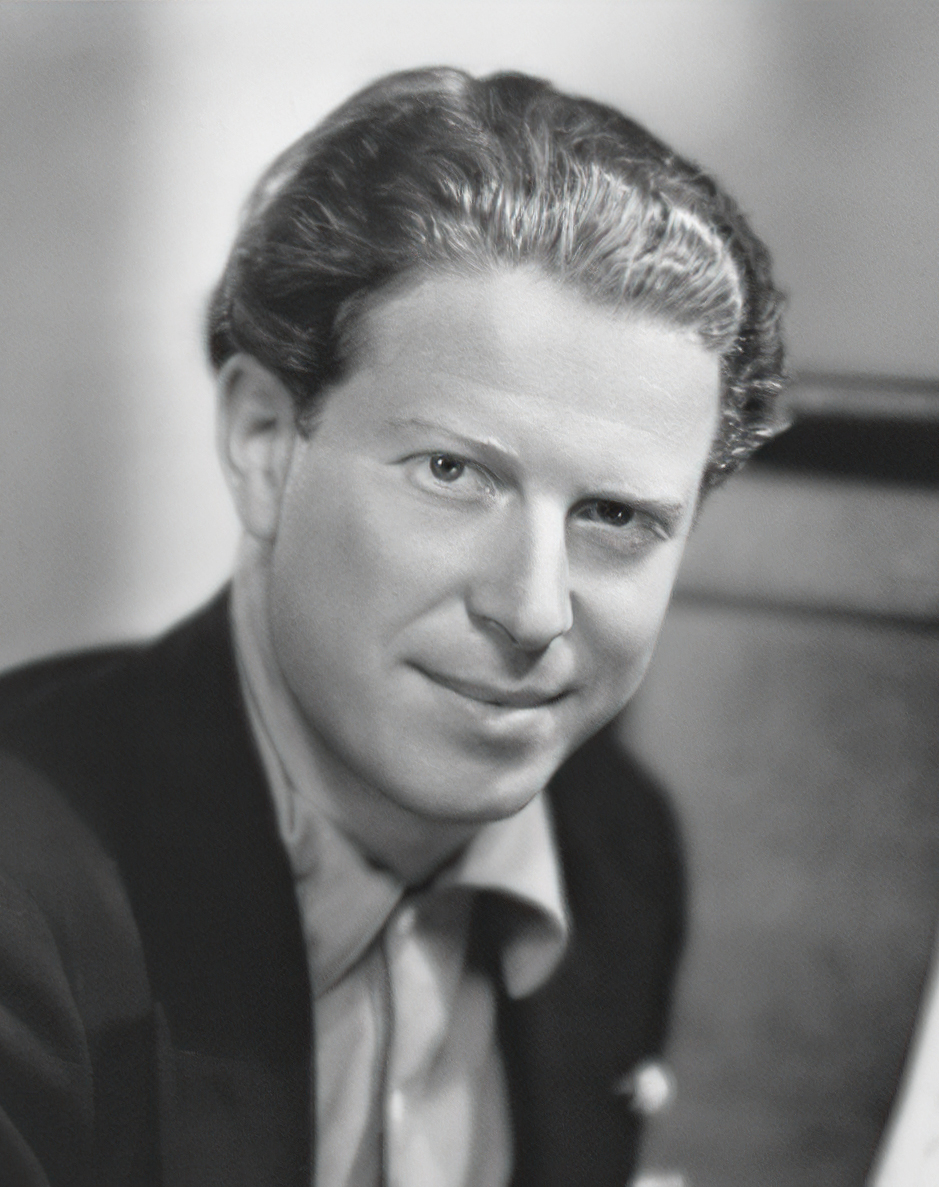
- Alter, c. 1930
- Born: June 18, 1902; Haverhill, Massachusetts
- Died: November 3, 1980 (aged 78); Manhattan, New York, U.S.

Louis Alter (June 18, 1902 – November 3, 1980) was an American pianist, songwriter and composer. At 13, he began playing piano in theaters showing silent films. He studied at the New England Conservatory of Music under the tutelage of Stuart Mason.

== Biography ==
He was born on June 18, 1902, in Haverhill, Massachusetts.

Alter played in vaudeville houses as the accompanist for the headliners Irène Bordoni and Nora Bayes. He appeared with Bayes from 1924 until her death in 1928, touring the United States and abroad. Since he had previously written some songs for Broadway shows, Alter decided to concentrate on songwriting after her death. His first hit was "Manhattan Serenade" (1929), originally an instrumental that later became the theme music of the Easy Aces radio program. There are numerous recordings of "Manhattan Serenade" and it was featured prominently in Nancy Groce's book, New York: Songs of the City (Watson-Guptill, 1999). Alter recalled, "I was a great fan of Whiteman when I first came down here from Boston. He was the first big name I actually followed around and met. I was having a love affair with New York when Whiteman commissioned me to write a tone poem. I walked around this city for six months absorbing the sights and sounds. And then suddenly it came to me. Once I plunged into it I finished it in two hours."

== Films and Broadway ==
In 1929, Alter moved to Hollywood, where he wrote songs for films, beginning with The Hollywood Review of 1929. He continued to provide piano accompaniment for various singers, including Beatrice Lillie and Helen Morgan. His contributions to Broadway musicals included songs in Sweet and Low (1930) and Ballyhoo (1931).

His first song hit was "Hugs and Kisses" in 1926. In 1928, he composed the music and wrote the lyrics of Paris. Other top tunes by Alter include "My Kinda Love", "You Turned the Tables on Me", "Nina Never Knew", "Do You Know What It Means to Miss New Orleans" (for the 1947 film New Orleans), "Blue Shadows" and "Rainbow on the River". He wrote "A Melody from the Sky" and "Twilight on the Trail" for The Trail of the Lonesome Pine (1936). His collaborators included Oscar Hammerstein II, Charlotte Kent, Raymond Klages, Sidney D. Mitchell and Jo Trent.

== World War II and later years ==
In 1941, Alter signed on with the United States Air Force, performing for troops and also co-ordinating shows and other entertainment at West Coast air bases. As a piano soloist with the Los Angeles Philharmonic, he performed at the Hollywood Bowl. In 1942, "Manhattan Serenade" once again became a hit after Harold Adamson added lyrics.

Alter also composed large-scale pieces for piano and orchestra, including American Serenade and Metropolitan Nocturne. In later years, he lived in New York and maintained a summer residence on Fire Island.

== Awards ==
Twice nominated for Academy Awards ("Dolores", "A Melody from the Sky"), he was inducted into the Songwriters Hall of Fame in 1975.

== Death ==
He died on November 3, 1980, aged 78, of pneumonia at Saint Clare's Hospital in Manhattan, New York City.

== Hurricane Katrina ==
After Hurricane Katrina, his song "Do You Know What It Means to Miss New Orleans" took on a different kind of meaning in 2005–06 and experienced a revival due to its use in various post-Katrina documentary films and TV shows. It was used for strong emotional effect in Spike Lee's four-hour film When the Levees Broke (2006) and an equally moving dramatic sketch by Billy Crystal on HBO's Comic Relief 2006.

== Orchestral compositions ==
- American Serenade
- Jewels from Cartier Suite
- Manhattan Masquerade
- Manhattan Moonlight
- Metropolitan Nocturne
- Side Street in Gotham
- Manhattan Serenade

== Songs ==
- "Blue Shadows"
- "Circus" (1949). Alter wrote the song with lyrics by Bob Russell for a party for John Ringling North, head of the Ringling Bros. and Barnum & Bailey Circus.
- "Dolores"
- "Do You Know What It Means to Miss New Orleans"
- "Give Trouble the Air" (1927)
- "Hugs and Kisses" (1926)
- "Overnight" (1930)
- "Manhattan Serenade"
- "A Melody from the Sky"
- "My Kinda Love"
- "Nina Never Knew"
- "Rainbow on the River"
- "You Turned The Tables On Me"

== Listen to ==
- Jazz violinist John Frigo playing Louis Alter's "Nina Never Knew"
- Tommy Dorsey: "Manhattan Serenade"
