= Sidney D. Mitchell =

American songwriter

Sidney D. Mitchell (June 15, 1888 in Baltimore, Maryland – February 25, 1942 in Los Angeles, California) was a Hollywood film industry lyricist and composer.

Mitchell is best known for his collaborations with Lew Pollack on movie scores at Twentieth Century Fox in the 1930s and 1940s. Together with Louis Alter, Mitchell was nominated for an Oscar in 1937 for the song "A Melody from the Sky" which was in the 1936 motion picture The Trail of the Lonesome Pine. He contributed several songs to the film Sitting on the Moon (1936). His work continues to be featured to the present day. He also served as a screenwriter for three movies.

== Filmography ==
- Umpa (1933, screenplay and story)
