= Lady Sings the Blues (song) =

Single by Billie Holiday

from the album Lady Sings the Blues
- Recorded: June 6, 1956, New York City, Fine Sound Studios
- Genre: Blues, jazz
- Length: 3:46
- Label: Clef, Verve
- Songwriter(s): Billie Holiday; Herbie Nichols

"Lady Sings the Blues" is a song written by jazz singer Billie Holiday and jazz pianist Herbie Nichols.

It is the title song to her 1956 album, released on Clef/Verve Records (MGC 721/Verve MV 2047).

The song was also chosen to be the title of the 1956 autobiography by Holiday and author William Dufty, and the 1972 movie starring Diana Ross as Holiday.

== Recording session ==
Studio session #75 New York City, June 6, 1956, Tony Scott & His Orchestra (Verve), with Charlie Shavers on trumpet, Tony Scott on clarinet, Paul Quinichette on tenor saxophone, Wynton Kelly on piano, Kenny Burrell on guitar, Aaron Bell on bass, Lenny McBrowne on drums, and Billie Holiday on vocals.

== Notable cover versions ==
- Ella Fitzgerald (1957)
- Archie Shepp (1966)
- Diana Ross (1972)
- Terence Blanchard (1993)
- Peter Nero (1995)
- Nnenna Freelon (1999)
- Lonnie Liston Smith (1999)
- Smokey Robinson (2001)
- Deni Hines (2007)
- Rebecca Ferguson (2015)
- Regina Spektor's "Lady" is related to this song.
