= What a Little Moonlight Can Do =

1934 song written by Harry M. Woods

Song by Violet Loraine
- Released: November 29, 1934
- Genre: Show tunes
- Length: 2:49
- Songwriter(s): Harry M. Woods

"What a Little Moonlight Can Do" is a popular song written by Harry M. Woods in 1934. In 1934, Woods moved to London for three years where he worked for the British film studio Gaumont British, contributing material to several films, one of which was Road House (1934). The song was sung in the film by Violet Loraine and included an introductory verse, not heard in the version later recorded by Billie Holiday in 1935.

== Notable recordings ==
- Lew Stone and His Band (vocal by Al Bowlly) - recorded in London on August 3, 1934 (Dec F-5270).
- Billie Holiday, accompanied by Teddy Wilson & His Orchestra, on July 2, 1935. This reached the various charts of the day in the USA. She recorded the song again in 1954 for the album Billie Holiday.
- Jack Jackson - this also was very popular in 1935.
- Helen Ward and Benny Goodman - published 1953 by Columbia Records 78 rpm, jazz
- Bing Crosby and Gary Crosby - recorded November 4, 1953 with John Scott Trotter and His Orchestra.
- Billy Eckstine - for his album Billy Eckstine's Imagination (1958)
- Peggy Lee covered it with a Nelson Riddle arrangement on her 1959 album Jump for Joy
- Betty Carter recorded it on her 1960 album The Modern Sound of Betty Carter.
- Nancy Wilson - included in her album Something Wonderful (1960)
- Anita O'Day - included in her album Trav'lin' Light (1961)
- Diana Ross recorded it in her 1972 album Lady Sings the Blues and in concert in 1992, released as Diana Ross Live - Stolen Moments: The Lady Sings... Jazz and Blues
- Crystal Gayle included it on her 1980 album These Days.
- Dee Bell covered it with an Eddie Duran big band arrangement on their 1985 Concord Jazz album with Tom Harrell - One by One.
- Robert Palmer's Tin Pan Alley-themed album Ridin' High included a version backed by Clare Fischer's big band arrangement (1992)
- Karrin Allyson included it in her debut album I Didn't Know About You (1992)
- Dee Dee Bridgewater included in her album Keeping Tradition (1993)
- Tony Bennett - included in his album Tony Bennett on Holiday (1997).
- Steve Tyrell recorded it in his 2001 album, Standard Time
- Emilie-Claire Barlow recorded it in her album, "The Very Thought of You" (2007).
- Cécile McLorin Salvant included it in her second album, WomanChild (2013).
- Cassandra Wilson recorded it on her 2015 album, Coming Forth by Day, an album that pays tribute to Billie Holiday by covering songs she wrote as well as made famous.
- The Hot Sardines has it on their debut album released in 2014
- Sinne Eeg included it in her 2014 album for Stunt Records, Face The Music.
- Paula Cole included it on her 2017 album Ballads.
- José James included it on his 2015 album Yesterday I Had The Blues: The Music Of Billie Holiday.

== See also ==
- List of 1930s jazz standards
