= List of songs written by Ashford & Simpson =

This is a list of songs written by Nickolas Ashford and Valerie Simpson.

== Chart hits and other notable songs written by Nickolas Ashford and Valerie Simpson ==
Year	Song	Original artist	^{U.S. Pop}	^{U.S. R&B}	^{UK Singles Chart}	Other charting versions, and notes
1965	"The Real Thing"	Betty Everett	-	-	-	Written by Ashford, Simpson, and Jo Armstead; 1965: Tina Britt, #20 R&B
1965	"Let's Go Get Stoned"	The Coasters	-	-	-	Written by Ashford, Simpson, and Jo Armstead; 1966: Ray Charles, #31 US, #1 R&B
1965	"One Step at a Time"	Maxine Brown	55	-	-	Written by Ashford, Simpson, and Jo Armstead
1965	"Hey Ho, What You Do to Me"	The Guess Who	125	-	-	Written by Ashford, Simpson, and Jo Armstead, #3 hit in Canada
1965	"Never Had It So Good"	Ronnie Milsap	106	19	-	Written by Ashford, Simpson, and Jo Armstead; B-side: Let's Go Get Stoned
1966	"The Hard Way"	The Nashville Teens	-	-	45	Written by Ashford, Simpson, and Jo Armstead
1966	"Cry Like a Baby"	Aretha Franklin	-	27	-	Written by Ashford, Simpson, and Jo Armstead; 1973: Dorothy Moore, #79 R&B
1966	"I Don't Need No Doctor"	Ray Charles	72	45	-	Written by Ashford, Simpson, and Jo Armstead; 1971: Humble Pie, #71 US; 1972: New Riders of the Purple Sage, #81 US; 1987: W.A.S.P. (live), #31 UK
1967	"Ain't No Mountain High Enough"	Marvin Gaye and Tammi Terrell	19	3	-	1970: Diana Ross, #1 US, #1 R&B, #6 UK; 1981: Boys Town Gang, #46 UK; 1986: Diana Ross, #85 UK (reissue); 1998: Whitehouse, #60 UK; 1998: Jocelyn Brown, #35 UK; Credited as co-writers with Amy Winehouse, following use of sample: 2007: Amy Winehouse, "Tears Dry on Their Own", #16 UK; 2011: Amy Winehouse, "Tears Dry on Their Own", #27 UK (reissue)
1967	"Your Precious Love"	Marvin Gaye and Tammi Terrell	5	2	-	1982: Al Jarreau and Randy Crawford, #16 R&B; 1990: Tamika Patton, #20 R&B; 1999: Erykah Badu and D'Angelo, #83 R&B
1967	"California Soul"	The Messengers	-	-	-	1968: The 5th Dimension, #25 US, #49 R&B; 1970: Marvin Gaye and Tammi Terrell, #56 US; 2005: Riot Act, #59 UK
1968	"Ain't Nothing Like the Real Thing"	Marvin Gaye and Tammi Terrell	8	1	34	1974: Aretha Franklin, #47 US, #6 R&B; 1976: Donny and Marie Osmond, #21 US; 1982: Chris Christian, #88 US; 1994: Marcella Detroit and Elton John, #24 UK
1968	"Some Things You Never Get Used To"	Diana Ross and the Supremes	30	43	34	
1968	"You're All I Need to Get By"	Marvin Gaye and Tammi Terrell	7	1	19	1971: Aretha Franklin, #19 US, #3 R&B; 1975: Tony Orlando & Dawn, #34 US; 1978: Johnny Mathis & Deniece Williams, #47 US, #10 R&B, #45 UK; 1995: Method Man, #3 US, #1 R&B, #10 UK
1968	"I Am Your Man"	Bobby Taylor & the Vancouvers	85	40	-	
1968	"Destination: Anywhere"	The Marvelettes	63	28	-	
1968	"Keep On Lovin' Me Honey"	Marvin Gaye and Tammi Terrell	24	11	-	
1969	"You Ain't Livin' Till You're Lovin'"	Marvin Gaye and Tammi Terrell	-	-	21	
1969	"Good Lovin' Ain't Easy to Come By"	Marvin Gaye and Tammi Terrell	30	11	26	
1969	"Didn't You Know (You'd Have to Cry Sometime)"	Gladys Knight & the Pips	63	11	-	
1969	"The Onion Song"	Marvin Gaye and Tammi Terrell	50	18	9	
1969	"What You Gave Me"	Marvin Gaye and Tammi Terrell	49	6	-	1979: Diana Ross, #86 R&B
1970	"Reach Out and Touch (Somebody's Hand)"	Diana Ross	20	7	33	1973: Diana Ross, #51 UK (reissue)
1970	"Who's Gonna Take the Blame"	Smokey Robinson & the Miracles	46	9	-	
1970	"Remember Me"	Diana Ross	16	10	7	
1971	"Surrender"	Diana Ross	38	16	10	
1972	"Tear It On Down"	Martha Reeves and the Vandellas	-	37	-	
1972	"Silly Wasn't I"	Valerie Simpson	63	24	-	Written by Ashford, Simpson, and Jo Armstead
1973	"(I'd Know You) Anywhere"	Ashford & Simpson	88	37	-	
1974	"Have You Ever Tried It"	Ashford & Simpson	-	77	-	
1974	"Main Line"	Ashford & Simpson	-	37	-	
1974	"Don't Send Nobody Else"	Ace Spectrum	57	20	-	
1974	"Everybody's Got to Give It Up"	Ashford & Simpson	-	53	-	
1974	"Shoe Shoe Shine"	The Dynamic Superiors	68	16	-	
1975	"I Had a Love "	Ben E. King	-	77	-	
1975	"Bend Me"	Ashford & Simpson	-	73	-	
1975	"Leave It Alone"	The Dynamic Superiors	-	13	-	
1975	"Nobody's Gonna Change Me"	The Dynamic Superiors	-	51	-	
1975	"Deception"	The Dynamic Superiors	-	53	-	
1976	"It'll Come, It'll Come, It'll Come"	Ashford & Simpson	-	96	-	
1976	"Somebody Told a Lie"	Ashford & Simpson	-	58	-	
1976	"Tried, Tested and Found True"	Ashford & Simpson	-	52	-	
1977	"So So Satisfied"	Ashford & Simpson	-	27	-	
1977	"Over and Over"	Ashford & Simpson	-	39	-	
1977	"Send It"	Ashford & Simpson	-	15	-	
1978	"Don't Cost You Nothing"	Ashford & Simpson	79	10	51	
1978	"By Way of Love's Express"	Ashford & Simpson	-	35	-	
1978	"Stuff Like That"	Quincy Jones	21	1	34	Written by Ashford, Simpson, Steve Gadd, Eric Gale, Quincy Jones, Ralph MacDonald and Richard Tee
1978	"It Seems to Hang On"	Ashford & Simpson	-	2	48	
1978	"Ride-O-Rocket"	The Brothers Johnson	-	45	50	
1978	"I'm Every Woman"	Chaka Khan	21	1	11	1989: Chaka Khan (remix), #8 UK; 1993: Whitney Houston, #4 US, #5 R&B, #4 UK; 2004: Chaka Khan (reissue), #80 UK
1978	"Is It Still Good to Ya"	Ashford & Simpson	-	12	-	
1979	"Flashback"	Ashford & Simpson	-	70	-	
1979	"Found a Cure"	Ashford & Simpson	36	2	-	
1979	"The Boss"	Diana Ross	19	12	40	1997: The Braxtons, #31 UK
1979	"Nobody Knows"	Ashford & Simpson	-	19	-	
1979	"No One Gets the Prize"	Diana Ross	-	-	59	
1979	"It's My House"	Diana Ross	-	27	32	1979: Storm, #36 UK
1980	"Gimme Something Real"	Wardell Piper	-	53	-	
1980	"Clouds"	Chaka Khan	-	10	-	1997: The Source, #38 UK
1980	"Our Love's In Danger"	Chaka Khan	-	10	-	
1980	"Top of the Stairs"	Collins and Collins	-	68	-	
1980	"Landlord"	Gladys Knight and the Pips	46	3	-	
1980	"Love Don't Make It Right"	Ashford & Simpson	-	6	-	
1980	"A Taste of Bitter Love"	Gladys Knight and the Pips	-	38	35	
1980	"Happy Endings"	Ashford & Simpson	-	35	-	
1980	"Bourgie', Bourgie'"	Gladys Knight and the Pips	-	45	32	
1981	"Bad Company"	Ullanda McCullough	-	36	-	
1981	"I Ain't Asking"	Phyllis Hyman	-	-	-	
1981	"I Will Fight"	Gladys Knight and the Pips	-	21	-	
1981	"If That'll Make You Happy "	Gladys Knight and the Pips	-	37	-	
1981	"Get Out Your Handkerchief "	Ashford & Simpson	-	65	-	
1981	"It Shows in the Eyes"	Ashford & Simpson	-	34	-	
1982	"A Friend of Mine"	Gladys Knight and the Pips	-	50	-	
1982	"Keep Away Girls"	Stephanie Mills	-	13	-	
1982	"Street Corner"	Ashford & Simpson	56	9	-	
1982	"Love It Away"	Ashford & Simpson	-	20	-	
1983	"High-Rise"	Ashford & Simpson	-	17	-	
1983	"It's Much Deeper"	Ashford & Simpson	-	45	-	
1984	"Solid"	Ashford & Simpson	12	1	3	
1985	"Outta the World"	Ashford & Simpson	-	4	-	
1985	"Babies"	Ashford & Simpson	-	29	56	
1986	"Count Your Blessings"	Ashford & Simpson	-	4	79	
1989	"I'll Be There for You"	Ashford & Simpson	-	2	-	
1989	"Uh-Uh Ooh-Ooh Look Out (Here It Comes)"	Roberta Flack	-	37	72	
1990	"Hungry for Me Again"	Ashford & Simpson	-	40	-	
1996	"Been Found"	Ashford & Simpson	-	80	-	
