= Marvin Gaye and Tammi Terrell's Greatest Hits =

Greatest hits album by Marvin Gaye & Tammi Terrell
- Released: July 4, 1970
- Genre: R&B, soul
- Length: 31:15
- Label: Tamla
- Producer: Ashford & Simpson, Harvey Fuqua, Johnny Bristol, Marvin Gaye

Marvin Gaye & Tammi Terrell chronology
Easy (1969)	Marvin Gaye and Tammi Terrell's Greatest Hits (1970)	The Complete Duets (2001)

Marvin Gaye chronology
That's the Way Love Is (1970)	Marvin Gaye and Tammi Terrell's Greatest Hits (1970)	Super Hits (1970)

Tammi Terrell chronology
Easy (1969)	Marvin Gaye and Tammi Terrell's Greatest Hits (1970)	Superstar Series Volume 2 (1980)

Marvin Gaye and Tammi Terrell's Greatest Hits is a 1970 compilation album released by Marvin Gaye and Tammi Terrell on Motown's Tamla label. It is a collection of the duo's recording material, penned and produced by the songwriting-producing team of Ashford & Simpson except for two tracks. The album was released shortly after the death of Terrell, who died of a brain tumor at the age of 24.

== Track listing ==
All of the tracks were written and produced by Nickolas Ashford & Valerie Simpson unless noted.

Side one

1. "Your Precious Love" (3:02)
2. "Ain't No Mountain High Enough" (2:27)
3. "You're All I Need to Get By" (2:48)
4. "Ain't Nothing Like the Real Thing" (2:13)
5. "Good Lovin' Ain't Easy to Come By" (2:27)
6. "If This World Were Mine" (Marvin Gaye) (2:41)

Side two

1. "The Onion Song" (2:56)
2. "If I Could Build My Whole World Around You" (Johnny Bristol/Vernon Bullock/Harvey Fuqua) (2:20)
3. "Keep On Lovin' Me Honey" (2:29)
4. "What You Gave Me" (2:42)
5. "You Ain't Livin' Till You're Lovin'" (2:26)
6. "Hold Me Oh My Darling" (Fuqua) (2:44)
