= Diana Ross' Greatest Hits =

Greatest hits album by Diana Ross
- Released: July 12, 1976
- Length: 34:40
- Label: Motown

Diana Ross chronology
Diana Ross (1976)	Diana Ross' Greatest Hits (1976)	An Evening with Diana Ross (1977)

Diana Ross' Greatest Hits is a compilation album by American singer Diana Ross. It was released by Motown Records on July 12, 1976 in the United States. In the United Kingdom and certain other territories the album was released under the title Greatest Hits 2 since a similar compilation, Greatest Hits, had already been released in 1972. It comprises songs from her studio albums Diana Ross (1970), Everything Is Everything (1970), Surrender (1971), Touch Me in the Morning (1973), Last Time I Saw Him (1973) and Diana Ross (1976) as well as soundtrack recordings.

The album reached number 13 on the US Billboard 200 and peaked at number 10 on the US Top R&B/Hip-Hop Albums, eventually selling over 650,000 copies. In the United Kingdom, it climbed to number 2 on the UK Albums Chart and reached gold status for sales in excess of 100,000 copies.

== Critical reception ==
Professional ratings
Review scores
Source	Rating
AllMusic	3/5 stars
Christgau's Record Guide	B+

AllMusic editor Stephen Thomas Erlewine called the album "a good sampler, especially for casual fans who only want hits from this era."

== Track listing ==
=== US edition ===
Side A
No.	Title	Writer(s)	Original album	Length
1.	"Touch Me in the Morning"	Michael Masser; Ron Miller	Touch Me in the Morning	3:26
2.	"Love Hangover"	Marilyn McLeod; Pam Sawyer	Diana Ross	7:49
3.	"Last Time I Saw Him"	Masser; Sawyer	Last Time I Saw Him	2:50
4.	"I Thought It Took a Little Time (But Today I Fell in Love)"	Masser; Sawyer	Diana Ross	3:19
5.	"Theme from Mahogany (Do You Know Where You're Going To)"	Masser; Gerry Goffin	Mahogany	2:50

Side B
No.	Title	Writer(s)	Original album	Length
1.	"Ain't No Mountain High Enough"	Ashford; Simpson	Diana Ross	6:16
2.	"Remember Me"	Nickolas Ashford; Valerie Simpson	Surrender	3:16
3.	"One Love in My Lifetime"	Terri McFaddin; Lawrence Brown; Leonard Perry	Diana Ross	3:56
4.	"Reach Out and Touch (Somebody's Hand)"	Ashford; Simpson	Diana Ross	3:02
5.	"Good Morning Heartache"	Irene Higginbotham; Ervin Drake; Dan Fisher	Lady Sings the Blues	2:20

=== International edition ===
Side A
No.	Title	Writer(s)	Original album	Length
1.	"Touch Me in the Morning"	Masser; Miller	Touch Me in the Morning	3:52
2.	"Love Hangover"	McLeod; Sawyer	Diana Ross	7:49
3.	"I'm Still Waiting"	Richards	Everything Is Everything	2:50
4.	"Last Time I Saw Him"	Masser; Sawyer	Last Time I Saw Him	2:50
5.	"Sorry Doesn't Always Make It Right"	Masser	Ross	3:19
6.	"I Thought It Took a Little Time (But Today I Fell in Love)"	Masser; Sawyer	Diana Ross	3:19
7.	"Theme from Mahogany (Do You Know Where You're Going To)"	Masser; Goffin	Mahogany	2:50

Side B
No.	Title	Writer(s)	Original album	Length
1.	"Ain't No Mountain High Enough"	Ashford; Simpson	Diana Ross	6:16
2.	"Remember Me"	Ashford; Simpson	Surrender	3:16
3.	"One Love in My Lifetime"	McFaddin; Brown; Perry	Diana Ross	3:56
4.	"Good Morning Heartache"	Higginbotham; Drake; Fisher	Lady Sings the Blues	2:20
5.	"All of My Life"	Michael Randall	Touch Me in the Morning	3:29
6.	"Reach Out and Touch (Somebody's Hand)"	Ashford; Simpson	Diana Ross	3:02
7.	"Doobeedoo'Ndoobe, Doobeedoo'Ndoobe, Doobeedoo'Ndoo"	Richards	Everything Is Everything	4:50

== Charts ==
=== Weekly charts ===
Chart (1976)	Peak position
Australian Albums (Kent Music Report)	47
Canada Top Albums/CDs (RPM)	6
New Zealand Albums (RMNZ)	7
UK Albums (Official Charts)	2
US Billboard 200	13
US Top R&B/Hip-Hop Albums (Billboard)	10

=== Year-end charts ===
Chart (1976)	Position
UK Albums (OCC)	14

== Certifications ==
Region	Certification	Certified units/sales
Canada (Music Canada)	Gold	50,000^{^}
United Kingdom (BPI)	Gold	100,000^{^}
^{^} Shipments figures based on certification alone.
