= The Complete Duets =

Compilation album by Marvin Gaye and Tammi Terrell
- Released: 2001
- Recorded: 1965–1969
- Genre: Soul
- Length: 2:24:16
- Label: Motown
- Producers: Ashford and Simpson; Johnny Bristol; Harvey Fuqua; Frank Wilson; Berry Gordy, Jr.

Marvin Gaye and Tammi Terrell chronology
Marvin Gaye and Tammi Terrell's Greatest Hits (1970)	The Complete Duets (2001)

Marvin Gaye chronology
The Very Best of Marvin Gaye (2001)	The Complete Duets (2001)	Forever Yours (2002)

Tammi Terrell chronology
The Essential Collection (2001)	The Complete Duets (2001)	Love Songs: Greatest Duets (2003)

Professional ratings
Review scores
Source	Rating
Allmusic	4.5/5 stars

The Complete Duets is a two-disc compilation album of duet recordings by Motown Records artists Marvin Gaye and Tammi Terrell, recorded between 1965 and 1969. The set compiles all of the tracks from the duo's three albums - United, You're All I Need and Easy - as well as several of Tammi Terrell's solo recordings and other previously unissued material.

== Track listing ==
Superscripts identify the following: tracks marked (a) are Tammi Terrell solo tracks with Gaye's vocals overdubbed to create duet versions, tracks marked (b) were rumored to feature Valerie Simpson substituting for Tammi Terrell, tracks marked (c) are Tammi Terrell solo recordings, and tracks marked (d) are previously unreleased.

=== Disc one ===
1. "Ain't No Mountain High Enough" (Nickolas Ashford, Valerie Simpson)
2. "You Got What It Takes" (Berry Gordy, Jr., Gwen Gordy, Tyran Carlo)
3. "If I Could Build My Whole World Around You" (Harvey Fuqua, Johnny Bristol, Vernon Bullock)
4. "Somethin' Stupid" (C. Carson Parks)
5. "Your Precious Love" (Ashford, Simpson)
6. "Hold Me Oh My Darling" (Fuqua) ^{a}
7. "Two Can Have a Party" (Bristol, Fuqua, Thomas Kemp) ^{a}
8. "Little Ole Boy Little Ole Girl" (Fuqua, Etta James, Brook Benton)
9. "If This World Were Mine" (Marvin Gaye)
10. "Sad Wedding" (Bristol, Jackey Beavers)
11. "Give a Little Love" (Bristol, Fuqua, Clyde Wilson)
12. "Oh How I'd Miss You" (Hal Davis, Frank Wilson, Vance Wilson)
13. "Ain't Nothing Like the Real Thing" (Ashford, Simpson)
14. "Keep On Loving Me Honey" (Ashford, Simpson)
15. "You're All I Need to Get By" (Ashford, Simpson)
16. "Baby Doncha Worry" (Bristol, Beavers) ^{a}
17. "You Ain't Livin' 'Til You're Lovin'" (Ashford, Simpson)
18. "Give In, You Just Can't Win" (Fuqua, Bristol) ^{a}
19. "When Love Comes Knocking At Your Heart" (Fuqua, Bristol, Gladys Knight, Bullock) ^{a}
20. "Come On and See Me" (Fuqua, Bristol)
21. "I Can't Help But Love You" (Robert Gordy, Kemp, Gaye)
22. "That's How It Is (Since You've Been Gone)" (Fuqua, Bristol, Bullock) ^{a}
23. "I'll Never Stop Loving You Baby" (Fuqua, Bristol, Beatrice Verdi)
24. "Memory Chest" (Fuqua, Bristol) ^{a}
25. "Ain't Nothing Like The Real Thing" (Alternate Take) (Ashford, Simpson) ^{d}
26. "Keep On Lovin' Me Honey" (Alternate Vocal) (Ashford, Simpson) ^{d}
27. "We'll Be Satisfied" (F. Wilson, Marc Gordon) ^{d}

=== Disc two ===
1. "Good Lovin' Ain't Easy to Come By" (Ashford, Simpson) ^{b}
2. "California Soul" (Ashford, Simpson) ^{b}
3. "Love Woke Me Up This Morning" (Ashford, Simpson) ^{b}
4. "This Poor Heart of Mine" (Ashford, Simpson) ^{b}
5. "I'm Your Puppet" (Spooner Oldham, Dan Penn) ^{b}
6. "The Onion Song" (Ashford, Simpson) ^{b}
7. "What You Gave Me" (Ashford, Simpson) ^{b}
8. "Baby I Need Your Loving" (Holland-Dozier-Holland) ^{b}
9. "I Can't Believe You Love Me" (Fuqua, Bristol) ^{a}
10. "How You Gonna Keep It (After You Get It)" (Ashford, Simpson) ^{b}
11. "More, More, More" (Fuqua, Bristol, C. Wilson) ^{a}
12. "Satisfied Feelin'" (Ashford, Simpson) ^{b}
13. "I Can't Believe You Love Me" (Single Version) ^{c}
14. "Hold Me Oh My Darling" (Single Version) ^{c}
15. "Come On And See Me" (Single Version) ^{c}
16. "Baby Don'tcha Worry" (Single Version) ^{c}
17. "Ain't No Mountain High Enough" (Ashford, Simpson) ^{c, d}
18. "Two Can Have A Party" (Bristol, Fuqua, Kemp) ^{c, d}
19. "Oh How I'd Miss You" (Demo) (Davis, F. Wilson, V. Wilson) ^{c, d}
20. "You Ain't Livin' Till You're Lovin'" (Ashford, Simpson) ^{c, d}
21. "Give In You Just Can't Win" (Fuqua, Bristol, C. Wilson) ^{c, d}
22. "When Love Comes Knocking At My Heart" (Fuqua, Bristol, Knight, Bullock) ^{c, d}
23. "Memory Chest" (Fuqua, Bristol) ^{c, d}
24. "That's How It Is (Since You've Been Gone)" (Fuqua, Bristol, Bullock) ^{c, d}
25. "More, More, More" (Fuqua, Bristol, C. Wilson) ^{c, d}

== Credits ==
- Lead (and additional background) vocals by Marvin Gaye and Tammi Terrell
- Background vocals by Johnny Bristol, Harvey Fuqua, Hal Davis, Nickolas Ashford, Valerie Simpson, The Andantes, The Originals and The Spinners
- Instrumentation by The Funk Brothers
