= Marvin Gaye and His Girls =

Greatest hits album by Marvin Gaye
- Released: April 2, 1969
- Recorded: 1964–1969
- Length: 32:45
- Label: Tamla
- Producer: William "Mickey" Stevenson, Clarence Paul, Smokey Robinson, Ashford & Simpson

Marvin Gaye chronology
In the Groove (1968)	Marvin Gaye and His Girls (1969)	M.P.G. (1969)

Marvin Gaye and His Girls is a 1969 compilation album of duets recorded by Marvin Gaye and various female singers on the Tamla label. Among the ladies Gaye sung with were Mary Wells (the hits "Once Upon a Time" and "What's the Matter With You Baby"), Kim Weston ("What Good Am I Without You?" and "It Takes Two") and Tammi Terrell ("Your Precious Love" and "Good Lovin' Ain't Easy to Come By"). It was the original album release of "Good Lovin' Ain't Easy to Come By," which later appeared on Easy. His solo album M.P.G. (named with his initials), was released simultaneously, on Gaye's thirtieth birthday.

== Track listing ==
No.	Title	Duet with	Length
1.	"Once Upon a Time"	Mary Wells	2:30
2.	"What's the Matter With You Baby"	Mary Wells	2:25
3.	"It's Got to Be a Miracle (This Thing Called Love)"	Kim Weston	3:25
4.	"It Takes Two"	Kim Weston	2:54
5.	"Your Precious Love"	Tammi Terrell	2:59
6.	"Good Lovin' Ain't Easy to Come By"	Tammi Terrell	2:27
7.	"Little Ole Boy, Little Ole Girl"	Tammi Terrell	2:39
8.	"I Can't Help But Love You"	Tammi Terrell	2:42
9.	"What Good Am I Without You"	Kim Weston	2:45
10.	"I Want You 'Round"	Kim Weston	2:21
11.	"'Deed I Do"	Mary Wells	2:55
12.	"Together"	Mary Wells	2:43

== Credits ==
- Lead (and additional background) vocals by Marvin Gaye, Mary Wells, Kim Weston, and Tammi Terrell
- Background vocals by The Love Tones, The Originals, The Spinners, and The Andantes
- Instrumentation by The Funk Brothers
