= Super Hits (Marvin Gaye album) =

Greatest hits album by Marvin Gaye
- Released: September 1970
- Recorded: 1962–69
- Length: 44:44
- Label: Tamla
- Producer: William "Mickey" Stevenson, Brian Holland, Lamont Dozier, Frank Wilson, Norman Whitfield, Smokey Robinson

Marvin Gaye chronology
Marvin Gaye and Tammi Terrell's Greatest Hits (1970)	Super Hits (1970)	What's Going On (1971)

Super Hits is a compilation album by the American soul singer, songwriter, and producer Marvin Gaye. It was released in 1970 by Motown's subsidiary Tamla Records and compiles Gaye's pop-R&B singles recorded from 1962 to 1969.

== Cover art ==
The album's cover art is a cartoon illustration created by artist Carl Owens. It depicts Gaye as a muscle-bound superhero flying high in the sky and catching a cracked antenna from the WHIT radio station. A voluptuous, scantily-clad black woman is also shown clutching at his neck and waist for safety. Author and Gaye biographer David Ritz calls the cover "the perfect artistic expression of Marvin's mystique at that point of his career – Gaye as an established sex symbol".

== Critical reception ==
Retrospective professional reviews
Review scores
Source	Rating
AllMusic	4.5/5 stars
The New Rolling Stone Record Guide	4/5 stars

Music critic Robert Christgau views Super Hits as the best album released by Motown and includes it in his "Basic Record Library" of 1950s and 1960s recordings, published in Christgau's Record Guide: Rock Albums of the Seventies (1981). AllMusic's Ron Wynn regards it as "a fabulous anthology, one of the best ones Motown ever released".

A similarly titled compilation album was released in 2001 by Legacy Records and Sony Music, which The New Rolling Stone Album Guide (2004) warns is "not the wonderful 1970 Motown collection, now deleted, but a budget set of Midnight Love material".

== Track listing ==
Side one

1. "I Heard It Through the Grapevine" (Norman Whitfield, Barrett Strong) – 3:10
2. "Pride and Joy" (Whitfield, Marvin Gaye, Mickey Stevenson) – 2:09
3. "The End of Our Road" (Roger Penzabene, Whitfield, Strong) – 2:49
4. "Ain't That Peculiar" (Smokey Robinson, Marv Tarplin, Bobby Rogers, Pete Moore) – 2:57
5. "Stubborn Kind of Fellow" (Gaye, George Gordy, Mickey Stevenson) – 2:47
6. "Can I Get a Witness" (Brian Holland, Lamont Dozier, Eddie Holland) – 2:46
7. "How Sweet It Is (To Be Loved By You)" (Holland, Dozier, Holland) – 2:59
8. "That's the Way Love Is" (Whitfield, Strong) – 3:15

Side two

1. "Too Busy Thinking About My Baby" (Whitfield, Janie Bradford, Strong) – 2:54
2. "Chained" (Frank Wilson) – 2:37
3. "You're a Wonderful One" (Holland, Dozier, Holland) – 2:44
4. "Try It Baby" (Berry Gordy) – 2:57
5. "I'll Be Doggone" (Robinson, Moore, Tarplin) – 2:47
6. "Hitch Hike" (Gaye, Clarence Paul, Stevenson) – 2:27
7. "You" (Jack Goga, Ivy Jo Hunter, Jeffrey Bowen) – 2:46
8. "Baby Don't You Do It" (Holland, Dozier, Holland) – 2:40
