= The Essential Collection (Tammi Terrell album) =

Compilation album by Tammi Terrell
- Released: July 1, 2001
- Recorded: 1965–1969
- Genre: Soul
- Length: 49:18
- Label: Spectrum Music; Tamla-Motown
- Producer: Johnny Bristol, Harvey Fuqua, Smokey Robinson, James Dean, William Weatherspoon, Clarence Paul, Norman Whitfield

Tammi Terrell chronology
| 20th Century Masters – The Millennium Collection: The Best of Marvin Gaye & Tammi Terrell (2000) | The Essential Collection (2001) |

Professional ratings
Review scores
| Source | Rating |
|---|---|
| Allmusic | 4.5/5 stars |

The Essential Collection is a compilation album for Motown soul singer Tammi Terrell, released by Universal Music Group's Spectrum Music in the United Kingdom in 2001. The compilation includes Terrell's only solo album, Irresistible in its entirety, several B-sides and unreleased tracks, and Terrell's most famous duet recording with singing partner Marvin Gaye, "Ain't No Mountain High Enough".

== Track listing ==
1. "I Can't Believe You Love Me" (Harvey Fuqua, Johnny Bristol)
2. "That's What Boys Are Made For" (Fuqua, Gwen Gordy)
3. "Come On and See Me" (Fuqua, Bristol)
4. "What a Good Man He Is" (Smokey Robinson, Al Cleveland)
5. "Tears at the End of a Love Affair" (Fuqua, Bristol, Sylvia Moy)
6. "This Old Heart of Mine (Is Weak for You)" (Holland–Dozier–Holland)
7. "He's the One I Love" (Robinson)
8. "Can't Stop Now (Love Is Calling)" (James Dean, Stanley McMullen, William Weatherspoon)
9. "Just Too Much to Hope For" (Fuqua, Bristol, Clyde Wilson, Wilbur Jackson)
10. "Hold Me Oh My Darling" (Fuqua)
11. "I Can't Go on Without You" (Fuqua, Bristol, Moy)
12. "Baby Don't You Worry" (Bristol, Jackey Beavers)
13. "There Are Things" (Fuqua, Bristol)
14. "Two Can Have a Party" (Solo Version) (Fuqua, Bristol, Thomas Kemp)
15. "Lone Lonely Town" (Jennie Lee Lambert, Mickey Gentile)
16. "Slow Down" (Jesse Bradman, Clarence Paul)
17. "I Gotta Find a Way to Get You Back" (Cornelius Grant, Eddie Kendricks, Edward Holland, Jr., Norman Whitfield)
18. "Ain't No Mountain High Enough" (with Marvin Gaye) (Nickolas Ashford, Valerie Simpson)
