= No Love in the Room =

Single by The 5th Dimension

from the album Soul and Inspiration
- B-side: "I Don't Know How to Look for Love"
- Released: February 1975
- Genre: Soul
- Length: 3:05
- Label: Arista Records 0101
- Songwriter(s): Pat McManus, Walt Pedroski
- Producer(s): John Florez

The 5th Dimension singles chronology
"Harlem" (1974)	"No Love in the Room" (1975)	"Love Hangover" (1976)

"No Love in the Room" is a song written by Pat McManus and Walt Pedroski and performed by The 5th Dimension. It reached #11 on the U.S. adult contemporary chart, #41 on the Canadian adult contemporary chart, and #105 on the Billboard chart in 1975. It was featured on their 1974 album, Soul and Inspiration.

The song was produced by John Florez and arranged by D'Arneill Pershing.
