= Diana Ross (1976 album) =

Studio album by Diana Ross
- Released: February 10, 1976
- Recorded: 1975
- Genres: Soul; disco
- Length: 33:00
- Labels: Motown; M6-861S1
- Producers: Michael Masser; Hal Davis; Berry Gordy; Don Costa; Lawrence Brown; Gil Askey

Diana Ross chronology
Live at Caesars Palace (1974)	Diana Ross (1976)	Diana Ross' Greatest Hits (1976)

Singles from Diana Ross
- 1. "Theme from Mahogany (Do You Know Where You're Going To)" Released: September 24, 1975; 2. "I Thought It Took a Little Time (But Today I Fell in Love)" Released: February 20, 1976; 3. "Love Hangover" Released: March 16, 1976; 4. "One Love in My Lifetime" Released: August 11, 1976

Professional ratings
Review scores
Source	Rating
AllMusic	4/5 stars
Christgau's Record Guide	B−
The New Rolling Stone Album Guide	3.5/5 stars

Diana Ross is the seventh studio album by American singer Diana Ross, released on February 10, 1976 by Motown Records. It is her second self-titled record after her 1970 debut. Her biggest-selling album since Touch Me in the Morning (1973), the album reached the top five on both the Billboard 200 and R&B Albums chart. It was certified gold by the BPI.

Two of the tracks included on Diana Ross were number one hits: "Theme from Mahogany (Do You Know Where You're Going To)" (released as a single in 1975 from the Mahogany soundtrack), and the disco anthem, "Love Hangover".

The album's official lead single "I Thought It Took A Little Time" was on its way to becoming a hit when its chart life was circumvented by "Love Hangover", which was rushed to release alongside a competing version by The 5th Dimension. "I Thought It Took A Little Time" became a Top 5 Adult Contemporary single despite its shortened run on the Billboard Hot 100. A final single, the disco-flavoured "One Love in My Lifetime" become a Top 10 US R&B hit.

The album also included cover versions of the Charlie Chaplin standard "Smile" and "Ain't Nothin' But A Maybe" that had previously been recorded by its writers Ashford & Simpson and Rufus & Chaka Khan. "After You" was subsequently recorded by Roberta Flack on her classic 1977 album Blue Lights In The Basement while R&B starlet Stacy Lattisaw covered 'I Thought It Took a Little Time" on her 1985 album I'm Not The Same Girl. British soul singer Joss Stone covered "One Love in My Lifetime" for her 2012 album The Soul Sessions Vol. 2.

The album's number one singles, "Theme from Mahogany (Do You Know Where You're Going To)" and "Love Hangover" have been covered by many artists including Mariah Carey, Shirley Bassey, Johnny Mathis, Jody Watley, Jennifer Lopez, and Tina Arena.

Ross was also nominated for a Grammy Award for "Love Hangover" (Best R&B Performance, Female Artist), and an Academy Award for "Best Song" for "Theme from Mahogany (Do You Know Where You're Going To)", which Ross performed live via satellite from Amsterdam, the Netherlands, where it was still dark in the early morning hours. Victor Skrebneski photographed Diana's iconic album art, which was later chosen by the Italian Fan Club association as 'The Most Beautiful Album Art'. She performed many of the tracks from the album on her Tony Award-winning, An Evening with Diana Ross Broadway show, tour, television special and album.

In 2012, Motown/Universal re-released the album in an Expanded Edition, including tracks recorded for the original sessions that were shelved (including cover versions of contemporary tunes by Elton John and Sly and the Family Stone) and alternative versions of many of the album tracks.

== Track listing ==
Diana Ross – Side one
No.	Title	Writer(s)	Producer(s)	Length
1.	"Theme from Mahogany (Do You Know Where You're Going To)"	Michael Masser; Gerry Goffin	Masser	3:23
2.	"I Thought It Took a Little Time (But Today I Fell in Love)"	Masser; Pam Sawyer	Masser	3:33
3.	"Love Hangover"	Sawyer; Marilyn McLeod	Hal Davis	7:48
4.	"Kiss Me Now"	Gwen Gordy Fuqua; Kenneth Lupper	Berry Gordy; Don Costa	2:42

Diana Ross – Side two
No.	Title	Writer(s)	Producer(s)	Length
1.	"You're Good My Child"	Lupper	Gordy; Costa	3:35
2.	"One Love in My Lifetime"	Terri McFaddin; Lawrence Brown; Leonard Perry	Brown	3:40
3.	"Ain't Nothin' but a Maybe"	Nickolas Ashford; Valerie Simpson	Diana Ross	3:27
4.	"After You"	Masser; Ron Miller	Masser	4:13
5.	"Smile"	John Turner; Geoffrey Parsons; Sir Charles Chaplin	Gil Askey	2:55

== CD re-issue ==
2012 Expanded Edition

Track listing for 2012 2-CD set issued on the Hip-o-Select label.

Disc 1

1. "Theme from Mahogany (Do You Know Where You're Going To)" – 3:24
2. "I Thought It Took a Little Time (But Today I Fell in Love)" – 3:25
3. "Love Hangover" – 7:48
4. "Kiss Me Now" – 2:44
5. "You're Good My Child" – 3:36
6. "One Love in My Lifetime" – 3:40
7. "Ain't Nothin' but a Maybe" – 3:26
8. "After You" – 4:11
9. "Smile" – 3:00
10. "Sorry Doesn't Always Make It Right" (Single Version) (Michael Masser, Pam Sawyer) – 3:33
11. "Together" (Single Version) (Michael Masser, Pam Sawyer) – 3:17
12. "I Thought It Took a Little Time (But Today I Fell in Love)" (Single Version) – 3:21
13. "Love Hangover" (Single Version) – 3:49
14. "One Love in My Lifetime" (Single Version) – 4:03
15. "To Love Again" (Alternate Version) (Michael Masser, Gerry Goffin) – 4:33
16. "We're Always Saying Goodbye" (Alternate Version) (Ron Miller, Terry Etlinger) – 2:35
17. "This Christmas" (Alternate Version) (Nadine McKinnor, Donny Pitts) – 4:10
18. "Coming Home" (Unreleased Mix of Coca-Cola advert) (William Bakker, Roquel Davis, Rob McBrien) – 1:44

Tracks 1 to 9 include a remaster of the complete 1976 album Diana Ross

Tracks 10 and 11 non-album single tracks issued as A and B-side in 1975

Tracks 12 to 14 edited/remixed single versions taken from the 1976 album Diana Ross

Tracks 15 and 16 alternative versions of tracks taken from the 1978 album Ross

Track 17 alternative version of a track taken from the 1993 Motown album Christmas in the City

Track 18 previously unreleased mix of 1975 advert soundtrack for Coca-Cola, issued on Motown promotional single only

Disc 2

1. "Theme from Mahogany (Do You Know Where You're Going To)" (Alternate Version #1) – 3:26
2. "I Thought It Took a Little Time (But Today I Fell in Love)" (Alternate Version) – 3:58
3. "Love Hangover" (Alternate Version) – 8:17
4. "Kiss Me Now" (Alternate Version) – 2:58
5. "You're Good My Child" (Alternate Version) – 4:36
6. "One Love in My Lifetime" (Alternate Version) – 4:40
7. "Ain't Nothin' but a Maybe" (Alternate Version) – 4:00
8. "After You" (Alternate Version) – 5:00
9. "Sorry Doesn't Always Make It Right" (Alternate Version) – 3:35
10. "Together" (Alternate Version) – 4:19
11. "Theme from Mahogany (Do You Know Where You're Going To)" (Alternate Version #2) – 4:05
12. "Harmony" (Elton John, Bernie Taupin) – 3:45
13. "Le Lo Li" (Sylvester Stewart) – 3:26
14. "Go Where Your Mind Is" (Jeffery Bowen, Bubba Banks) – 3:23
15. "Diana Ross Interview" – 15:49

Tracks 1 to 8 and 11 include alternative takes from the 1976 album Diana Ross

Tracks 9 and 10 alternative takes of non-album single tracks issued as A and B-side in 1975

Tracks 12 to 14 previously unreleased tracks recorded in 1975 and 1976

Track 15 January 1976 interview for TWA Airlines; conducted by Don Pietromonaco

== Charts ==
=== Weekly charts ===
Chart (1976)	Peak position
Australia (Kent Music Report)	39
Canada Top Albums/CDs (RPM)	2
Dutch Albums (Album Top 100)	2
French Albums (SNEP)	8
Japanese Albums (Oricon)	27
Swedish Albums (Sverigetopplistan)	26
UK Albums (Official Charts)	4
US Billboard 200	5
US Top R&B/Hip-Hop Albums (Billboard)	4

=== Year-end charts ===
Chart (1976)	Position
Canada Top Albums/CDs (RPM)	18
Dutch Albums (Album Top 100)	20
UK Albums (OCC)	38
US Billboard 200	41
US Top R&B/Hip-Hop Albums (Billboard)	18

== Certifications ==
Region	Certification	Certified units/sales
United Kingdom (BPI)	Gold	100,000^{^}
^{^} Shipments figures based on certification alone.
