= Lovin', Livin' and Givin' =

- French edition cover

Single by Diana Ross

from the album Thank God It's Friday
- B-side: Various: "Together" (Japan); "Top of the World" (Italy); "After You" (France, Netherlands, West Germany); "Baby It's Me" (Spain); "You Got It" (UK)
- Released: July 7, 1978
- Recorded: 1977–1978
- Studio: Motown Recording, Hollywood, California
- Genre: Disco
- Length: 4:40
- Label: Motown
- Songwriters: Kenneth Stover; Pam Davis
- Producer: Hal Davis

Diana Ross singles chronology
"You Got It" (1977)	"Lovin', Livin' and Givin'" (1978)	"Ease On down the Road" (1978)

"Lovin', Livin' and Givin'" is a song recorded by American singer Diana Ross. It was produced by Hal Davis and written by Kenneth Stover and Pam Davis. The song was included in the film soundtrack to Thank God It's Friday and peaked at number thirty-five on the disco charts.

== Background and release ==
In 1976, Ross released her first disco song, "Love Hangover", which became popular in the United States and abroad. Its producer was Hal Davis, together with him the singer conducted a number of sessions in 1977, intending to create a new dance album. In the same period, the song "Lovin' Livin' and Givin'" was recorded. Initially, it was an ordinary dance melody.

Soon the song was included in the film Thank God It's Friday, largely due to the fact that Motown, with which Ross collaborated, was working on the film. In the film, an almost instrumental version sounded in the background. In May 1978, the song was released on the soundtrack (in some editions of the album, the length of the song varies).

At the same time, a new studio album Ross was being prepared for release (more precisely, a compilation of old and new tracks). For it, the song was remixed, elements of electronic music were added—in the wake of the popularity of "I Feel Love", many artists began to introduce it into their songs. Motown decided to release it as a single in the USA (but it never took place) and the rest of the world. The song performed well, reaching number 54 in the UK, as well as number 35 on the US dance chart along with "What You Gave Me".

In 1979, the song was released as a B-side on some editions of the single "The Boss".

== Critical reception ==
The song received mostly negative reviews from critics. Jason Elias of AllMusic stated that Ross performs this song through force, pretending that there is enthusiasm in it. Paul Sexton, in his review for Record Mirror, called it an "charmless disco song" and noted the end of the Ross' creativity.

== Charts ==
Chart performance for "Lovin', Livin' and Givin'"
Chart (1978)	Peak position
UK Singles (OCC)	54
US Dance Club Songs (Billboard)	35
