= Too Shy to Say =

Too Shy to Say may refer to:

- "Too Shy to Say", a song written and performed by Stevie Wonder on Fulfillingness' First Finale
- "Too Shy to Say", a song written by Stevie Wonder and performed by Diana Ross on Baby It's Me
