= You Got It (Diana Ross song) =

- Japanese edition cover

Single by Diana Ross

from the album Baby It's Me
- B-side: "Too Shy to Say"
- Released: April 13, 1978
- Recorded: 1977
- Genre: Funk; soul
- Length: 3:39
- Label: Motown
- Songwriters: Linda Laurie; Jerry Ragovoy
- Producer: Richard Perry

Diana Ross singles chronology
"Top of the World" (1978)	"You Got It" (1978)	"Lovin', Livin' and Givin'" (1978)

"You Got It" is a song recorded by American singer Diana Ross for her eighth studio album Baby It's Me (1977). Its authors were Linda Laurie and Jerry Ragovoy, Richard Perry served as the record producer.

The song was released as the fourth and final single from the album on April 13, 1978, by Motown Records. It reached number 49 on the Billboard Hot 100 and number 39 on the Soul chart, and as with the lead single "Gettin' Ready for Love", it hit the top ten of the Adult Contemporary chart.

In 2014, a reissue of Baby It's Me was released with new mixes of songs, including "You Got It", produced by Kevin Reeves.

== Critical reception ==
The reviewer of Record World stated that "this beautiful song reveals the best in Diana Ross' voice", and as a result it could become her biggest hit in recent times. He also found many echoes of the old Motown sound in the song, including Jimmy Ruffin-style backing vocals.

== Track listing ==
7" single
A. "You Got It" – 3:39
B. "Too Shy to Say" – 3:13

== Personnel ==
- Diana Ross – lead vocals
- Lenny Castro – percussion
- David Hungate – bass guitar
- Michael Omartian – Fender Rhodes piano
- Jeff Porcaro – drums, syndrums
- Ray Parker Jr. – guitar
- Gene Page - string arrangements, conductor
- Pattie Brooks – background vocals
- Becky Lewis – background vocals
- Petsye Powell – background vocals

== Charts ==
Chart performance for "You Got It"
Chart (1978)	Peak position
Canada Top Singles (RPM)	67
US Billboard Hot 100	49
US Adult Contemporary (Billboard)	9
US Hot R&B/Hip-Hop Songs (Billboard)	39
