= M.P.G. =

Studio album by Marvin Gaye
- Released: April 30, 1969
- Recorded: 1966–1968
- Studio: Hitsville USA, Detroit
- Genre: Soul; psychedelic soul; R&B
- Length: 36:15
- Label: Tamla
- Producer: Norman Whitfield, Brian Holland, Lamont Dozier

Marvin Gaye chronology
Marvin Gaye and His Girls (1969)	M.P.G. (1969)	Easy (1969)

Singles from M.P.G.
- 1. "Too Busy Thinking About My Baby" Released: April 2, 1969; 2. "That's the Way Love Is" Released: August 7, 1969; 3. "The End of Our Road" Released: May 19, 1970

M.P.G. is the ninth studio album by American soul musician Marvin Gaye, released in 1969 for the Tamla label. His best-selling album of the 1960s, it became Gaye's first solo album to reach the Top 40 on the Billboard Pop Albums chart, peaking at No. 33, and also became his first No. 1 album on the Soul Albums Chart. Three Top 40 hits were released from the album. The title matches the initials of Gaye's full name, Marvin Pentz Gay.

== Production ==
Norman Whitfield provided the compositions "Too Busy Thinking About My Baby" (originally recorded by labelmates the Temptations), "That's The Way Love Is" (originally recorded by the Isley Brothers) and a cover of Gladys Knight & the Pips' "The End of Our Road". The singles "Too Busy Thinking About My Baby", the longest-running No. 1 hit on the R&B charts in 1969 and a No. 4 Pop hit, and "That's The Way Love Is" (No. 2 and No. 7 on the soul and pop charts, respectively) became consecutive million-sellers. These records were among Whitfield's many psychedelic soul productions of the time, and recalled the arrangement of Gaye's No. 1 hit "I Heard It Through the Grapevine".

== Release and reception ==
Professional ratings
Review scores
Source	Rating
AllMusic	3/5 stars

Released on April 30, 1969, the album became Gaye's first solo album to reach the Top 40 on the Billboard Pop Albums chart, peaking at No. 33, and also became his first No. 1 album on the Top Soul Albums chart.

The album was moderately received on release, and remains overlooked, though Ron Wynn in a retrospective review for AllMusic, felt the album contains "some outstanding songs". In a contemporary review, Jack Egan in Rolling Stone felt that Gaye did not "aim for spectacular effects", but that the album "treats the listener to the same infectious music and subtly varied singing" of Gaye's previous successful singles.

== Track listing ==
No.	Title	Writer(s)	Length
1.	"Too Busy Thinking About My Baby"	Janie Bradford, Norman Whitfield, Barrett Strong	2:56
2.	"This Magic Moment"	Doc Pomus, Mort Shuman	2:44
3.	"That's the Way Love Is"	Strong, Whitfield	3:35
4.	"The End of Our Road"	Rodger Penzabene, Strong, Whitfield	2:47
5.	"Seek and You Shall Find"	Ivy Jo Hunter, William "Mickey" Stevenson	3:40
6.	"Memories"	Lawrence Brown, Gaye, Anna Gordy, Allen Story	2:47
7.	"Only a Lonely Man Would Know"	Hunter, Beatrice Verdi	3:02
8.	"It's a Bitter Pill to Swallow"	Warren Moore, Smokey Robinson	3:15
9.	"More Than a Heart Can Stand"	Hunter, Stevenson	2:57
10.	"Try My True Love"	Henry Cosby, James Dean, Stevie Wonder	3:00
11.	"I Got to Get to California"	Shena DeMell, Hunter	2:53
12.	"It Don't Take Much to Keep Me"	Holland-Dozier-Holland	2:39

== Personnel ==
- Marvin Gaye – lead vocals and background vocals
- The Andantes – background vocals
- The Originals – background vocals
- Gladys Knight & the Pips – background vocals (track 9)
- The Funk Brothers – instrumentation
