= Ross (1978 album) =

Studio album by Diana Ross
- Released: September 1978
- Recorded: 1971–1978
- Studios: Motown Recording Studios (Hollywood, California)
- Genres: R&B, soul
- Length: 38:56
- Label: Motown
- Producers: Hal Davis, Greg Wright, Ashford & Simpson, Michael Masser

Diana Ross chronology
Baby It's Me (1977)	Ross (1978)	The Wiz: Original Motion Picture Soundtrack (1978)

Singles from Ross
- 1. "Sorry Doesn't Always Make It Right" Released: February 11, 1975; 2. "Lovin', Livin' and Givin'" Released: June 1978; 3. "What You Gave Me" Released: December 28, 1978

Professional ratings
Review scores
Source	Rating
AllMusic	2/5 stars

Ross is the ninth studio album by American singer Diana Ross, released in September 1978 by Motown Records. The album served as a new album and a compilation, as it was a mixture of old and new songs. Side A consisting of four new tracks recorded in 1978, and Side B of material recorded by Ross between 1971 and 1975, but remixed and/or extended by Motown in-house producer Russ Terrana specifically for the Ross album. Ross peaked at number 49 on the US Pop Albums chart, and number 32 on Black Albums. The album failed to chart in the UK. Its final US sales figures stood at around 150,000 copies. The cover illustration was by Rickey Ricardo Gaskins. A different album also titled Ross was released on the RCA label in 1983.

Several outtakes from the 1978 Ross sessions produced by Hal Davis, Greg Wright and Michael Masser have subsequently been issued on various other albums with Ross. Titles among these include "For Once in My Life", "You Build Me Up to Tear Me Down", "Sweet Summertime Livin'", "Share Some Love", "We're Always Saying Goodbye", "Fire Don't Burn" and "We Can Never Light That Old Flame Again" (a non-album single in 1982).

Although only enjoying moderate chart success on its original release in 1978, in 2009 "Lovin', Livin' and Givin'" was one of thirteen tracks featured on Almighty Records' tribute/remix album We Love Diana Ross – The Remix Collection.

While alternate versions of most of the recordings contained on the Ross album have re-surfaced on a number of Motown/Universal Music compilations over the years, the original album in its original form was eventually re-released on compact disc (SHM CD) in Japan on November 28, 2012.

== Track listing ==
=== Side A ===
1. "Lovin', Livin' and Givin'" (Extended Remix) (Kenny Stover, Pam Davis) – 5:11
  - Recorded 1978. Produced by Hal Davis. Arranged by Art Wright. Edited version originally issued on first pressings of the soundtrack album Thank God It's Friday (Casablanca), May 1978. Overdubbed remix issued on subsequent pressings. Re-remixed for the album Ross, scheduled as US Motown single October 1978 (cancelled). Released as A-side single in the UK, Continental Europe and Scandinavia b/w "You Got It" (UK), "After You" (Germany and Scandinavia) and "Top of the World" (France and Italy).
2. "What You Gave Me" (Nickolas Ashford, Valerie Simpson) – 4:57
  - Recorded 1978. Produced by Hal Davis. Arranged by Art Wright. Edited version (3:39) released as 7" single b/w "Together" (1978 Remix). Also released as Motown US promo 12" single 12 TMG 1135, including extended remix (6:06) b/w "Ain't No Mountain High Enough" (Album version), commercially released as Motown blue vinyl 12" single 1C 052-62 325 YZ b/w "Lovin', Livin' and Givin'" in Germany.
3. "Never Say I Don't Love You" (Greg Wright, Karin Patterson) – 3:50
  - Recorded 1978. Produced by Greg Wright. Arranged by Greg Wright, John Barnes.
4. "You Were the One" (Greg Wright, Karin Patterson) – 4:01
  - Recorded 1978. Produced by Greg Wright. Arranged by Greg Wright, Jimmie Haskell, John Barnes.

=== Side B ===
1. "Reach Out, I'll Be There" (1978 Extended Remix) (Brian Holland, Lamont Dozier, Eddie Holland Jr.) – 5:30
  - Recorded 1971. Produced by Nickolas Ashford & Valerie Simpson. Arranged by Paul Riser. Edited version (3:59) originally released as Motown single, April 1971 b/w "They Long to Be Close to You" and original full-length version (4:50) on album Surrender, June 1971.
2. "Sorry Doesn't Always Make It Right" (1978 Remix) (Michael Masser) – 3:28
  - Recorded 1974. Produced by Michael Masser. Arranged by Lee Holdridge, Michael Masser. Originally released as Motown US & UK single, February 1975, b/w "Together".
3. "Where Did We Go Wrong" (1978 Remix) (Ron Miller, Tom Baird) – 4:24
  - Recorded 1973. Produced by Michael Masser. Arranged by Ken Hirsch. Outtake from 1973 album Last Time I Saw Him.
4. "To Love Again" (1978 Remix) (Gerry Goffin, Michael Masser) – 4:04
  - Recorded 1975. Produced by Michael Masser. Arranged by Lee Holdridge, Michael Masser. Outtake from Mahogany OST sessions, 1975.
5. "Together" (1978 Remix) (Michael Masser and Pam Sawyer) – 3:31
  - Recorded 1975. Produced by Michael Masser. Arranged by Gene Page. Originally released as B-side of Motown US & UK single "Sorry Doesn't Always Make It Right", February 1975.

== Detailed info on track "Lovin', Livin' and Givin'" ==
The version of "Lovin', Livin' and Givin'" in the 1978 American musical disco comedy film Thank God It's Friday is almost an instrumental used as a background for dialogue.

The different versions of the song are as following:

1. On the LP Ross (1978) and later as a B-side on the 12" "The Boss" (1979) – 5:10 (with its own disco break).
2. On the MCA re-issue I'm Coming Out and on the CD Anthology from 1986 (the 5:10 version edited to 3:30 with a progressive synthesizer intro but without the disco break).
3. On the European 7" and the US movie soundtrack (4:40 with a 50-second disco break different from the album version break). This version is the one available on the CD Thank God It's Friday (on both the single CD edition and the 2-CD set).
4. On the 1983 double LP Anthology (4:00, same as #3 without the progressive synth intro).
5. On the original Thank God It's Friday European LP (3:15, with a different arrangement, less synth).
6. On the CD The Motown Anthology (same as #5 but longer, 4:40). This one is usually referred to as the film mix, which it isn't. The mostly instrumental version heard in the film would in fact be #7.

== Detailed track info ==
The complete original album was finally released on CD in Japan; this is a list of alternate versions available on other CDs:

1. "Lovin', Livin' and Givin'"
  - 7" version on album Anthology
  - European 7" version on Thank God It's Friday soundtrack reissue
  - Thank God It's Friday full-length European LP mix on The Motown Anthology.
2. "What You Gave Me"
  - 12" Version on expanded CD re-issue of album diana (2003 deluxe edition)
  - 7" version on album Anthology.
3. "Reach Out I'll Be There"
  - Original version on 1971 album Surrender (different mix)
  - Mix #2 on Anthology (1986) and The Motown Anthology
  - Mix #3 on Forever Diana
4. "Sorry Doesn't Always Make It Right"
  - Original 7" mix on The Motown Anthology and Diana Ross (2012 reissue)
  - Ross mix but without harmonica on Anthology
  - Covered by Gladys Knight and the Pips on their 1978 album The One and Only
5. "Where Did We Go Wrong"
  - First take on CD re-issue of album Last Time I Saw Him (2007 reissue)
6. "Together"
  - Original single 1975 mix on CD re-issue of album To Love Again (2003 edition) and Diana Ross (2012 reissue)

== Personnel and production ==
- Berry Gordy – executive producer
- Suzee Wendy Ikeda – producer assistant
- Russ Terrana – mix
- Jack Andrews – mastering
- Mixed and mastered at Motown Recording Studios, Hollywood, California
- Rickey Ricardo Gaskins – artwork (illustration)
- Brenda Boyce – art direction
- Tony Jones – art direction

== Charts ==
Chart (1978–83)	Peak position
Canada Top Albums/CDs (RPM)	59
German Albums (Offizielle Top 100)	34
Norwegian Albums (VG-lista)	11
US Billboard 200	49
US Top R&B/Hip-Hop Albums (Billboard)	32
