= An Evening with Diana Ross =

Live album by Diana Ross
- Released: January 18, 1977
- Recorded: December 1976
- Venues: Ahmanson Theatre, Los Angeles
- Genres: Soul, pop
- Length: 66:05
- Label: Motown

Diana Ross chronology
Diana Ross' Greatest Hits (1976)	An Evening with Diana Ross (1977)	Baby It's Me (1977)

An Evening with Diana Ross is a 1977 live double album released by American singer Diana Ross on the Motown label. It was recorded live at the Ahmanson Theatre in Los Angeles in December 1976 during the international tour of Ross' one-woman show, for which she was awarded a special Tony Award after the show's run at Broadway's Palace Theater, followed by an Emmy-nominated TV special of the same name. It marked the first time in history a solo female headlined a 90-minute TV special. The album reached number 29 in the USA (number 14 R&B). The album showcased her live performances for the second time as a solo performer, following 1974's Live At Caesars Palace. It was the last live album Ross released until 1989's Greatest Hits Live.

The album includes a number of songs unique to this collection that Ross never recorded as studio tracks. These include a number of songs from Harry Nilsson's 1970 album and animated feature The Point!, selections from the 1975 Broadway hit musical A Chorus Line and covers of Dionne Warwick's "Here I Am' and longtime Motown collaborator Johnny Bristol's "I Wouldn't Change A Thing".

An Evening with Diana Ross was certified Silver in the UK for sales in excess of 60,000 copies.

Professional ratings
Review scores
Source	Rating
AllMusic	4.5/5 stars
Christgau's Record Guide	B−

== Track listing ==
=== Side A ===
1. "Overture" - 2:35
2. "Here I Am" (Burt Bacharach, Hal David) - 1:02
3. "I Wouldn't Change A Thing" (Johnny Bristol) - 1:50
4. "The Lady Is a Tramp" (Lorenz Hart, Richard Rodgers) - 2:00
5. "Touch Me in the Morning" (Michael Masser, Ron Miller) - 2:54
6. "Smile"/"Send In the Clowns" (Charlie Chaplin, Geoffrey Parsons, John Turner)/(Stephen Sondheim) - 4:30
7. "Love Hangover" (Marilyn McLeod, Pam Sawyer) - 4:49

=== Side B ===
1. "Girls" (John Phillips) - 1:20

The Point

2. "Everybody's Got 'Em" (Harry Nilsson) - 1:05
3. "Me and My Arrow" (Nilsson) - 1:17
4. "Lifeline" (Nilsson) - 3:01
5. "Everybody's Got 'Em" (Reprise) (Nilsson) - 1:07

The Working Girls (Billie Holiday, Josephine Baker, Ethel Waters, Bessie Smith)

6. "Lady Sings The Blues" (Holiday, Herbie Nichols) - 1:00
7. "T'Ain't Nobody's Bizness If I Do" (Grainger, Prince, Williams) - 1:02
8. "I Cried For You" (Arnheim, Freed, Lyman) - 0:53
9. "Aux Iles Hawaii" (Bastia) - 1:00
10. "Stormy Weather" (Harold Arlen, Ted Koehler) - 1:50
11. "Jump in the Pot (And Let's Get Hot)" (Instrumental) - 0:23
12. "I Need a Little Sugar in My Bowl" (Brymn, Smalls, Williams) - 2:13
13. "My Man" (Jacques Charles, Channing Pollack, Albert Willemetz, Maurice Yvain) - 2:18

=== Side C ===
The Motown Story - 4:52

1. "Motown Overture"
2. "Money (That's What I Want)" (Janie Bradford, Berry Gordy)
3. "Please Mr. Postman" (Robert Bateman, Georgia Dobbins, William Garrett, Freddie Gorman, Brian Holland)
4. "I Want You Back" (The Corporation)
5. "Fingertips" (Clarence Paul, Henry Cosby)

The Supremes - 6:28

6. "You Keep Me Hanging On" (Holland-Dozier-Holland)
7. "Baby Love" (Holland-Dozier-Holland)
8. "Someday We'll Be Together" (Johnny Bristol, Jackey Beavers, Harvey Fuqua)
9. "Stop! In the Name of Love" (Holland-Dozier-Holland)
10. "You Can't Hurry Love" (Holland-Dozier-Holland)
11. "Reflections" (Holland-Dozier-Holland)
12. "My World Is Empty Without You" (Holland-Dozier-Holland)
13. "I Hear a Symphony" (Holland-Dozier-Holland)

Reach Out

14. "Reach Out and Touch (Somebody's Hand)" (Nickolas Ashford, Valerie Simpson) - 2:49

=== Side D ===
One Giant Step

1. "The Music in the Mirror" (Hamlisch, Kleban) - 3:35
2. "What I Did for Love" (Hamlisch, Kleban) - 2:17
3. "Improvisations" - 1:19
4. "Dance: Ten; Looks: Three" (Hamlisch, Kleban) - 2:59
5. "Theme From Mahogany (Do You Know Where You're Going To)" (Gerald Goffin, Michael Masser) - 1:15
6. "Ain't No Mountain High Enough" (Ashford, Simpson) - 4:05

== Personnel ==
- Diana Ross - vocals
- Gregg Wright - keyboards
- Marty Harris - piano
- Gene Pello - drums
- Louis Spears - bass guitar
- Jerry Steinholtz - conga drum
- John Colins - guitar
- The Jones Girls - backing vocals
- Hayward Coleman - mime
- Don McLeod - mime
- Stewart Fischer - mime
- Gil Askey - arranger/conductor

== Charts ==
Chart (1977)	Peak position
Canada Top Albums/CDs (RPM)	21
UK Albums (Official Charts)	52
US Billboard 200	29
US Top R&B/Hip-Hop Albums (Billboard)	14

== Certifications ==
Region	Certification	Certified units/sales
United Kingdom (BPI)	Silver	60,000^{^}
^{^} Shipments figures based on certification alone.
