= Easy (Marvin Gaye and Tammi Terrell album) =

Studio album by Marvin Gaye and Tammi Terrell
- Released: September 16, 1969
- Studio: Hitsville, USA, Detroit
- Genre: Soul
- Label: Tamla
- Producer: Nickolas Ashford and Valerie Simpson; Harvey Fuqua; Johnny Bristol

Marvin Gaye and Tammi Terrell chronology
You're All I Need (1968)	Easy (1969)	Greatest Hits (1970)

Marvin Gaye chronology
M.P.G. (1969)	Easy (1969)	That's the Way Love Is (1970)

Tammi Terrell chronology
Irresistible (1969)	Easy (1969)	Greatest Hits (1970)

Singles from Easy
- 1. "Good Lovin' Ain't Easy to Come By" Released: January 14, 1969; 2. "What You Gave Me" Released: November 6, 1969; 3. "The Onion Song" Released: March 20, 1970

Easy is an album recorded by Marvin Gaye and Tammi Terrell, and released by Motown Records on September 16, 1969, under the Tamla Records label. "Good Lovin' Ain't Easy to Come By" was a hit single.

== Background ==
Terrell had been ill, suffering from complications caused by a brain tumor, since the fall of 1967. Marvin Gaye later claimed that as a result, most of the female vocals on this album were performed by Valerie Simpson, who served as co-songwriter and co-producer for the LP with her boyfriend and future husband Nickolas Ashford.

Simpson is quoted in Ludie Montgomery's biography of Terrell, My Sister Tommie, as not having subbed Terrell for vocals. Simpson again explicitly denied having done so in the liner notes to The Complete Motown Singles series. On the docuseries Unsung about Terrell, Simpson admitted she sang with Gaye during sessions saying, "I sang things with Marvin because Tammi was not available. And, then we would bring Tammi in to go over her parts. Those are Tammi Terrell vocals because we know that we went back in with Tammi and got what we needed."

Gaye at the time criticized Motown for the album thinking they were taking advantage of Terrell's health. Motown assured him proceeds from the album would go to Terrell's family for insurance of her health. At the time the album was released, Terrell was on her seventh operation to cure the brain tumor that would eventually kill her after the eighth operation. The album was released on compact disc in 1992, and again in 2001 as part of The Complete Duets.

== Track listing ==
All tracks written by Nickolas Ashford & Valerie Simpson except where noted.

Side one

1. "Good Lovin' Ain't Easy to Come By" 2:30
2. "California Soul" 2:55
3. "Love Woke Me Up This Morning" 2:34
4. "This Poor Heart of Mine" 2:45
5. "I'm Your Puppet" (Spooner Oldham, Dan Penn) 3:02
6. "The Onion Song" 3:01

Side two

1. "What You Gave Me" 2:47
2. "Baby I Need Your Loving" (Holland-Dozier-Holland) 3:15
3. "I Can't Believe You Love Me" (Harvey Fuqua, Johnny Bristol) 2:47
4. "How You Gonna Keep It (After You Get It)" 2:55
5. "More, More, More" (Fuqua, Bristol, Clyde Wilson) 2:32
6. "Satisfied Feelin'" 2:58

== Production notes ==
All tracks were produced by Nickolas Ashford & Valerie Simpson save for "I Can't Believe You Love Me" and "More, More, More". These two recordings, produced by Harvey Fuqua and Johnny Bristol, were Terrell solo tracks with Gaye's vocals overdubbed.

== Personnel ==
- Marvin Gaye – lead vocals
- Tammi Terrell – lead vocals with additional background vocals
- Valerie Simpson – lead vocals
- The Originals – background vocals
- The Andantes – background vocals
- The Spinners – background vocals
- The Funk Brothers – instrumentation
