= Sorry Doesn't Always Make It Right =

Single by Diana Ross
- B-side: "Together"
- Released: February 11, 1975
- Genre: Country pop
- Length: 3:29
- Label: Motown
- Songwriter(s): Michael Masser; Pam Sawyer
- Producer(s): Michael Masser

Diana Ross singles chronology
"Love Me" (1974)	"Sorry Doesn't Always Make It Right" (1975)	"Theme from Mahogany (Do You Know Where You're Going To)" (1975)

"Sorry Doesn't Always Make It Right" is a song recorded by American singer Diana Ross in 1975. The song was written by Pam Sawyer and Michael Masser, the latter also produced the recording.

The song was released as a single in February 1975 with "Together" on the b-side. Although the single did not enter either the Hot 100 or the Hot Soul Singles chart, however, in the United States and Canada it was able to enter the top twenty charts focused on the adult contemporary music, and in the UK it rose to number 23 on the official singles chart.

In 1978, the song was included on the album called Ross.

== Critical reception ==
Billboard placed the single in the recommended listening section. The reviewer of Cash Box wrote: "Diana Ross' high, handsome, heavenly voice hasn't graced the charts for too long a time but with this country tinged ballad that is sure to change. A beautifully crafted production with strings tying everything together nicely, this is hit bound." In another review, Cash Box called on all country music fans to listen to a super talented sensitive ballad about tragic love. Sue Byrom from Record Mirror noted that, as always, it is a beautifully sung, beautifully arranged number, and even if it is not the strongest thing in terms of charts, but this does not detract from its attractiveness. Record World stated: "Hearing it once means always having to say it's a winner."

== Charts ==
Chart performance for "Sorry Doesn't Always Make It Right"
Chart (1975)	Peak position
Canada Top 100 Singles (RPM)	75
Canada Top Pop Music Playlist (RPM)	15
UK Singles (Record Mirror)	23
US Top Easy Listening (Billboard)	17
US Top 100 Singles (Cash Box)	84
US The Singles Chart (Record World)	122

== Cover versions ==
- The vocal group Gladys Knight & the Pips recorded their version of the song for the 1978 album The One and Only, also produced by Michael Masser. The song reached number 24 on the Hot Soul Singles chart.
