= Your Love Is So Good for Me =

- French edition cover

Single by Diana Ross

from the album Baby It's Me
- B-side: "Baby It's Me"
- Released: January 24, 1978
- Recorded: 1977
- Studio: Studio 55, Los Angeles
- Genre: Soul; disco
- Length: 3:52
- Label: Motown
- Songwriter: Ken Peterson
- Producer: Richard Perry

Diana Ross singles chronology
"Gettin' Ready for Love" (1977)	"Your Love Is So Good for Me" (1978)	"Top of the World" (1978)

"Your Love Is So Good for Me" is a song recorded by American singer Diana Ross for her eighth studio album Baby It's Me (1977). The song was written by Ken Peterson, and produced by Richard Perry.

The song was released as the album's second single on January 24, 1978 by Motown Records, although in October 1977, unlike the lead single "Gettin' Ready for Love", released at the same time, it entered the US dance chart. The fact is that the album itself was released in September, and the first single was released only in October. During this time, DJs began to independently put tracks from the album in clubs, so "Your Love Is So Good for Me" and "Top of the World" hit the chart without being singles in October. The song quickly rose to the 15th position and stayed on the chart for 18 weeks. In the Hot 100, the song was less successful, reaching only the 49th position.

At the 20th Annual Grammy Awards, the song received a nomination, not yet being a single, in the category "Best Female R&B Vocal Performance", but lost to "Don't Leave Me This Way" by Thelma Houston.

== Track listing ==
7" single
A. "Your Love Is So Good for Me" – 3:49
B. "Baby It's Me" – 3:09

12" single
A. "Your Love Is So Good for Me" – 6:27
B. "Baby It's Me" – 3:12

== Charts ==
Chart performance for "Your Love Is So Good for Me"
Chart (1977–1978)	Peak position
Canada Top Singles (RPM)	66
US Billboard Hot 100	49
US Dance Club Songs (Billboard)	15
US Hot R&B/Hip-Hop Songs (Billboard)	16
US Cash Box Top 100	36
