= Too Busy Thinking About My Baby =

Single by Marvin Gaye

from the album M.P.G.
- B-side: "Wherever I Lay My Hat (That's My Home)"
- Released: April 2, 1969
- Recorded: Hitsville USA (Studio A); 1969
- Genre: Rock; soul
- Length: 2:55
- Label: Tamla; T 54181
- Songwriters: Norman Whitfield; Barrett Strong; Janie Bradford
- Producer: Norman Whitfield

Marvin Gaye singles chronology
| "Good Lovin' Ain't Easy to Come By" (1969) | "Too Busy Thinking About My Baby" (1969) | "That's the Way Love Is" (1969) |

Audio video
- "Too Busy Thinking About My Baby" on YouTube

"Too Busy Thinking About My Baby" is a Motown song written by Norman Whitfield, Barrett Strong, and Janie Bradford. The song was first recorded by The Temptations as a track on their 1966 album Gettin' Ready. Eddie Kendricks sings lead on the recording, which was produced by Whitfield. Jimmy Ruffin also recorded a version with The Temptations providing background vocals in 1966. It remained unreleased until 1997.

Three years later, Motown artist Marvin Gaye recorded a cover version of "Too Busy Thinking About My Baby" as a follow-up single to his 1968 hit "I Heard It Through the Grapevine", another Whitfield/Strong composition, which was a trans-atlantic top five hit. Whitfield produced Gaye's version as well, which featured background vocals by The Andantes. The song's lyrics feature the male narrator discussing how he has "no time to discuss weather" or "think about what money can buy", because when he thinks about his woman, "I ain't got time for nothing else".

In terms of chart success, "Too Busy Thinking About My Baby" was Gaye's second biggest hit of the 1960s, after "I Heard It Through the Grapevine". "Too Busy Thinking About My Baby" peaked at No.4 on the Billboard Hot 100 in the United States, and remained at the No.1 position on Billboard's Black Singles Chart for six consecutive weeks, from the weeks of, June 7 until July 12, 1969, with sales close to two million records. The single was the top-selling R&B single of the year, and also reached No.14 on Billboard’s year-end charts. The tune was the first release from Gaye's 1969 studio album M.P.G.. The single also reached No.5 in the UK Singles Chart.

Cash Box described it as a "medium paced rock effort" with a "solid vocal" and "a phenomenal production using tom-tom effectiveness to stoke up dance fan fires."

== Personnel ==
=== Temptations version ===
- Lead vocals by Eddie Kendricks
- Background vocals by David Ruffin, Eddie Kendricks, Melvin Franklin, Paul Williams, and Otis Williams
- Instrumentation by the Funk Brothers

=== Jimmy Ruffin version ===
- Lead vocals by Jimmy Ruffin
- Background vocals by David Ruffin, Eddie Kendricks, Melvin Franklin, Paul Williams, and Otis Williams
- Instrumentation by the Funk Brothers

=== Marvin Gaye version ===
- Lead vocals by Marvin Gaye
- Background vocals by the Andantes: Jackie Hicks, Marlene Barrow and Louvain Demps
- Instrumentation by the Funk Brothers

== Chart history ==
=== Weekly charts ===
| Chart (1969) | Peak position |
|---|---|
| Canada RPM Top Singles | 15 |
| UK Singles Chart | 5 |
| US Billboard Hot 100 | 4 |
| US Billboard R&B singles | 1 |
| US Cash Box Top 100 | 5 |

=== Year-end charts ===
| Chart (1969) | Rank |
|---|---|
| UK | 43 |
| US Billboard Hot 100 | 14 |
| US Cash Box | 53 |

== Other cover versions ==
- The Young Vandals cut the track for The Isley Brothers' T-Neck label. It peaked at No.46 on the R&B charts in 1970.
- "Too Busy Thinking About My Baby" was also covered by the New York-based rock group Mardi Gras in the early 1970s, and released as a single on Map City Records. It climbed high up the charts across Europe in 1971–72.
- In 1995, the Manhattan Transfer recorded the song for their album Tonin' with Phil Collins. This version No.27 on the Adult Contemporary chart in the United States. In Canada, the song reached No.58 on the pop singles chart and No.6 on the Adult Contemporary chart.
