= That's the Way Love Is (Isley Brothers song) =

- German release picture sleeve

Single by Marvin Gaye

from the album M.P.G./That's the Way Love Is
- B-side: "Gonna Keep On Tryin' Till I Win Your Love"
- Released: August 7, 1969
- Recorded: 1969, Hitsville U.S.A.
- Genre: Soul
- Length: 3:35
- Label: Tamla
- Songwriters: Norman Whitfield; Barrett Strong
- Producer: Norman Whitfield

Marvin Gaye singles chronology
"Too Busy Thinking About My Baby" (1969)	"That's the Way Love Is" (1969)	"What You Gave Me" (1969)

"That's the Way Love Is" is a 1967 Tamla (Motown) single recorded by The Isley Brothers and produced by Norman Whitfield.

== Marvin Gaye recording ==
The single was later covered in a 1969 hit version by Marvin Gaye. It was his third consecutive million-selling solo hit after "I Heard It Through the Grapevine" and "Too Busy Thinking About My Baby" written by Whitfield and Barrett Strong. Whitfield took the up-tempo Isley Brothers record, and turned it into a slowed-down psychedelic soul opus. Like "Grapevine", Gaye delivers the song in an emotionally wrought fashion, approaching a preacher-like tone through which he tells a woman to "forget" her lover now that the lover has gone off to someone else.

== Chart performance ==
The song peaked at #7 on the Billboard pop singles chart and held the #2 spot for five weeks on the soul singles chart in October 1969 (it was held off by The Temptations' "I Can't Get Next To You"), eventually selling a million copies.

== Personnel ==
Isley Brothers version

- Lead vocals by Ronald Isley
- Background vocals by O'Kelly Isley Jr., Rudolph Isley and The Andantes: Jackie Hicks, Marlene Barrow and Louvain Demps
- Instrumentation by The Funk Brothers

Marvin Gaye version

- Lead Vocals by Marvin Gaye
- Background Vocals by The Andantes: Jackie Hicks, Marlene Barrow and Louvain Demps
- Instrumentation by The Funk Brothers

Temptations version

- Lead vocals by Dennis Edwards and Paul Williams
- Background vocals by Eddie Kendricks, Melvin Franklin, Paul Williams, and Otis Williams
- Instrumentation by The Funk Brothers

The Commitments version

- Lead vocals by Imelda Quirke (Angeline Ball)
- Background vocals by Natalie Murphy (Maria Doyle) and Bernie McGloughlin (Bronagh Gallagher)
- Instrumentation by The Commitments

== Charts ==
Chart (1969)	Peak position
US Billboard Hot 100	7
US Hot R&B/Hip-Hop Songs (Billboard)	2
