= Gettin' Ready for Love =

- Cover art for Belgium vinyl single

Single by Diana Ross

from the album Baby It's Me
- B-side: "Confide in Me"
- Released: October 16, 1977
- Recorded: 1977
- Genre: Soul
- Length: 2:46
- Label: Motown
- Songwriters: Tom Snow, Franne Golde
- Producer: Richard Perry

Diana Ross singles chronology
"One Love in My Lifetime" (1976)	"Gettin' Ready for Love" (1977)	"Your Love Is So Good for Me" (1978)

"Gettin' Ready for Love" is a 1977 hit song by Diana Ross. It was the first single from her Baby It's Me LP. The song was released on October 16, 1977, by Motown Records. It was written by Tom Snow and Franne Golde and produced by Richard Perry. The song reached #27 on the U.S. Billboard Hot 100 and #29 in Canada. It also charted in the UK, reaching #23.

"Gettin' Ready for Love" was a much bigger hit on the Adult Contemporary charts of both the U.S. and Canada, peaking at #8 in the U.S. and #6 in Canada.

The song features an alto sax solo and strings at the bridge.

== Personnel ==
- Diana Ross – lead vocals
- David Hungate – bass guitar
- Steve Lukather – guitar
- Tom Snow – piano
- Tom Scott – saxophone solo
- Jack Ashford – percussion
- Gene Page – strings arrangements, conductor
- Jeff Porcaro – drums

== Charts ==
Chart performance for "Gettin' Ready for Love"
Chart (1977–1978)	Peak position
Canada Adult Contemporary (RPM)	6
Canada Top Singles (RPM)	29
France (IFOP)	52
UK Singles (Official Charts)	23
US Adult Contemporary (Billboard)	8
US Billboard Hot 100	27
US Hot R&B/Hip-Hop Songs (Billboard)	16
US Cash Box Top 100 Singles	32
US Cash Box Top 100 R&B	16
US Record World Top Singles	41
US Record World Top R&B Singles	18

== Later uses ==
- "Gettin' Ready for Love" was included on the 1985 compilation LP, Motown Chartbusters 150 Hits of Gold.
- The song was included in Ross's 1993 compilation LP, Forever Diana: Musical Memoirs.
- Martine McCutcheon recorded a karaoke version in 1999 and included it on her 2012 LP, The Collection.
- Winston Ward covered "Gettin' Ready for Love" for inclusion on the 2008 compilation LP, Northern Soul 2008.
