= Irresistible (Tammi Terrell album) =

Studio album by Tammi Terrell
- Released: January 1969
- Recorded: 1965–1968
- Genre: Soul
- Length: 30:01
- Label: Motown
- Producers: Johnny Bristol; Harvey Fuqua; Smokey Robinson; James Dean; William Weatherspoon

Tammi Terrell chronology
You're All I Need (1968)	Irresistible (1969)	Easy (1969)

Professional ratings
Review scores
Source	Rating
AllMusic	4.5/5 stars

Irresistible is the only solo album by Tammi Terrell, which was released in January 1969 by Motown Records.

== Information ==
Due to complications with a malignant brain tumor in 1968 which caused her death in March 1970, Terrell did not record a subsequent solo album.

This album compiles solo recordings Terrell made for Motown between 1965 and 1968. Two of the tracks included on this album were later dubbed with vocals from Terrell's frequent singing partner Marvin Gaye to create album tracks for the duo's joint albums. These tracks were "Hold Me Oh My Darling" (on 1967's United) and "I Can't Believe You Love Me" (on 1969's Easy).

A re-recorded version of "Come On and See Me" appears on the 1968 Gaye/Terrell album You're All I Need. "This Old Heart of Mine (is Weak for You)" is actually the original version of the more famous version of the 1966 Isley Brothers' hit by the same name, though its release was delayed until The Isley Brothers' version had already climbed the charts.

Irresistible reached No. 39 on the Billboard R&B albums chart in March 1969.

Terrell's singles from Irresistible and other unreleased songs were re-released on compact disc entitled Tammi Terrell: The Essential Collection by Motown in 2001.

== Track listing ==
=== Side one ===
1. "I Can't Believe You Love Me" (Harvey Fuqua, Johnny Bristol)
2. "That's What Boys Are Made For" (Fuqua, Gwen Gordy Fuqua)
3. "Come On and See Me" (Fuqua, Bristol)
4. "What a Good Man He Is" (Smokey Robinson, Al Cleveland)
5. "Tears at the End of a Love Affair" (Fuqua, Bristol, Sylvia Moy)
6. "This Old Heart of Mine (Is Weak for You)" (Holland–Dozier–Holland, Moy)

=== Side two ===
1. "He's the One I Love" (Robinson)
2. "Can't Stop Now (Love Is Calling)" (James Dean, Stanley McMullen, William Weatherspoon)
3. "Just Too Much to Hope For" (Fuqua, Bristol, Clyde Wilson, Wilbur Jackson)
4. "Hold Me Oh My Darling" (Fuqua)
5. "I Can't Go on Without You" (Fuqua, Bristol, Moy)

== Personnel ==
- Tammi Terrell – lead and additional backing vocals
- The Andantes and The Spinners – backing vocals
- The Funk Brothers – instrumentation

== Singles ==
- 1966: "I Can't Believe You Love Me" (#72 US, #27 US R&B)
- 1966: "Come On and See Me" (#80 US, #25 US R&B)
- 1967: "What a Good Man He Is" (single release canceled)
- 1969: "This Old Heart Of Mine (Is Weak For You)" (#67 US, #31 US R&B)
