= You're All I Need =

Studio album by Marvin Gaye & Tammi Terrell
- Released: August 1968
- Recorded: 1966 and 1967
- Genre: Soul, R&B
- Length: 33:31
- Label: Tamla
- Producer: Harvey Fuqua; Johnny Bristol; Ashford & Simpson; Robert Gordy

Marvin Gaye & Tammi Terrell chronology
United (1967)	You're All I Need (1968)	Easy (1969)

Marvin Gaye chronology
Greatest Hits, Vol. 2 (1967)	You're All I Need (1968)	In the Groove (1968)

Tammi Terrell chronology
United (1967)	You're All I Need (1968)	Irresistible (1969)

Singles from You're All I Need
- 1. "Ain't Nothing Like the Real Thing" Released: March 28, 1968; 2. "You're All I Need to Get By" Released: July 9, 1968; 3. "Keep On Lovin' Me Honey" Released: July 9, 1968; 4. "You Ain't Livin' till You're Lovin'" Released: 1968

Professional ratings
Review scores
Source	Rating
AllMusic	4/5 stars

You're All I Need is the second studio album by soul musicians Marvin Gaye and Tammi Terrell, released in August 1968 on Motown-subsidiary label Tamla Records. Highlighted by three hit singles written by Nickolas Ashford and Valerie Simpson (who composed two of the four hit songs on the first Gaye/Terrell duets LP, United), You're All I Need was recorded throughout 1966 and 1967 and features two Top 10 Billboard Hot 100 hits, "Ain't Nothing Like the Real Thing" and "You're All I Need to Get By". It peaked at #60 on the U.S. Billboard 200 Album Chart.

== History ==
The album was recorded in 1966 and 1967 during the time Gaye and Terrell's first collaboration album United was released. After recording You're All I Need, Tammi Terrell collapsed onstage while performing with Gaye at the Hampden–Sydney College homecoming in Virginia. She was later diagnosed with a brain tumor, and could no longer record nor perform live. According to Gaye, the final Gaye/Terrell album, Easy, would be completed by having Valerie Simpson fill in for Tammi Terrell on most of the album's songs, and having Gaye overdub archived Terrell solo tracks for two tracks. Simpson vehemently denies this and says they had to record Tammi's vocals in pieces in order to get the project done, but in the Unsung documentary about Terrell, she admits to singing guide vocals intended for the unavailable Terrell.

Nickolas Ashford and Valerie Simpson produced the singles "Ain't Nothing Like the Real Thing", "Keep On Loving Me Honey," and "You're All I Need to Get By." Harvey Fuqua and Johnny Bristol produced the rhythm tracks and Terrell's vocal for "You Ain't Livin' 'Til You're Lovin'," with Ashford and Simpson completing the production and supervising Gaye's vocal. Fuqua and Bristol also produced "I'll Never Stop Loving You Baby" while Motown CEO Berry Gordy, Jr.'s brother Robert Gordy produced "I Can't Help But Love You." Harvey Fuqua and Johnny Bristol produced "Come On and See Me," "Baby Dont'cha Worry," "Give In, You Just Can't Win," "When Love Comes Knocking At Your Heart," "That's How It Is (Since You've Been Gone)," and "Memory Chest" as Tammi Terrell solo tracks in 1965 and 1966, and had Gaye overdub his vocals to them to create duet versions.

The hit title track was revived 25 years later as a duet between rapper Method Man and hip-hop soul singer Mary J. Blige. Their rendition, titled "I'll Be There for You/You're All I Need", won Method Man and Blige a Grammy Award for Best Rap Vocal Performance by a Duo or Group in 1995.

== Track listing ==
Side one

1. "Ain't Nothing Like the Real Thing" (Nickolas Ashford, Valerie Simpson)
2. "Keep On Lovin' Me Honey" (Ashford, Simpson)
3. "You're All I Need to Get By" (Ashford, Simpson)
4. "Baby Don't Cha Worry" (Johnny Bristol, Jackie Beavers)
5. "You Ain't Livin' till You're Lovin'" (Ashford, Simpson)
6. "Give In, You Just Can't Win" (Harvey Fuqua, Bristol)

Side two

1. "When Love Comes Knocking at My Heart" (Fuqua, Bristol, Gladys Knight, Vernon Bullock)
2. "Come On and See Me" (Fuqua, Bristol)
3. "I Can't Help but Love You" (Robert Gordy, Thomas Kemp, Marvin Gaye)
4. "That's How It Is (Since You've Been Gone)" (Fuqua, Bristol, Bullock)
5. "I'll Never Stop Loving You Baby" (Fuqua, Bristol, Beatrice Verdi)
6. "Memory Chest" (Fuqua, Bristol)

== Credits ==
- Lead (and additional background) vocals by Marvin Gaye and Tammi Terrell
- Background vocals by Nickolas Ashford, Valerie Simpson, the Originals, the Andantes and the Spinners
- Instrumentation by the Funk Brothers

== Charts ==
Chart (1968–1969)	Peak position
UK R&B Albums (Record Mirror)	4
US Billboard 200	60
