= The One and Only (Gladys Knight & the Pips album) =

Studio album by Gladys Knight & the Pips
- Released: August 1978
- Recorded: 1977–1978
- Genre: Soul
- Length: 40:23
- Labels: Buddah; 5701
- Producers: Michael Masser, Van McCoy, Charles Kipps, Tony Camillo, Richie Wise, Rina Sinakin, Bruce Hawes, Gladys Knight & the Pips

Gladys Knight & the Pips chronology
Still Together (1977)	The One and Only (1978)	About Love (1980)

Professional ratings
Review scores
Source	Rating
AllMusic	2.5/5 stars
The Virgin Encyclopedia of R&B and Soul	3/5 stars

The One and Only is an album by the American musical group Gladys Knight & the Pips, released in August 1978 on the Buddah label. It was their eighth and final album recorded for Buddah.

The first single, "Sorry Doesn't Always Make It Right", was released in late 1977 and peaked at No. 24 on the R&B singles chart. Three more singles were released, including the title song, "The One and Only", "Come Back and Finish What You Started" and "It's a Better Than Good Time". They only achieved moderate success on the charts, with "It's a Better Than Good Time" reaching No. 16 on the R&B chart and "Come Back and Finish What You Started" peaking at No. 15 on the UK Singles Chart.

== Track listing ==
Side one
No.	Title	Writer(s)	Length
1.	"Sorry Doesn't Always Make It Right"	Michael Masser, Pam Sawyer	4:12
2.	"Come Back and Finish What You Started"	Van McCoy, Joe Cobb	3:29
3.	"All the Time"	Barry Manilow, Marty Panzer	4:36
4.	"It's a Better Than Good Time"	Tony Macaulay	5:58
5.	"Butterfly"	Tiny Barge	4:24

Side two
No.	Title	Writer(s)	Length
1.	"The One and Only"	Alan & Marilyn Bergman, Paul Williams	3:00
2.	"Saved by the Grace of Your Love"	William B. Smith, David Palmer	2:54
3.	"Don't Say No to Me Tonight"	Dick & Don Addrisi	3:35
4.	"Be Yourself"	Van McCoy	3:58
5.	"What If I Should Need You"	Charles H. Kipps, Jr.	4:17

== Charts ==
Chart (1978)	Peak
U.S. Billboard Top LPs	145
U.S. Billboard Top Soul LPs	30

Singles

Year	Single	Chart positions	
Year	Single	US R&B	UK
1977	"Sorry Doesn't Always Make It Right"	24	—
1978	"The One and Only"	40	32
1978	"Come Back and Finish What You Started"	—	15
1978	"It's a Better Than Good Time"	16	59
