= Baby It's Me =

Studio album by Diana Ross
- Released: September 16, 1977
- Recorded: 1977
- Studios: Studio 55 (Hollywood, California)
- Genres: Soul; pop; disco
- Length: 35:41
- Label: Motown
- Producer: Richard Perry

Diana Ross chronology
An Evening with Diana Ross (1977)	Baby It's Me (1977)	Ross (1978)

Singles from Baby It's Me
- 1. "Gettin' Ready for Love" Released: October 16, 1977; 2. "Your Love Is So Good for Me" Released: January 24, 1978; 3. "Top of the World" Released: February 1978; 4. "You Got It" Released: April 13, 1978

Baby It's Me is the eighth studio album by American singer Diana Ross, released on September 16, 1977, by Motown Records. It peaked at No. 18 on the Billboard Top 200 and No. 7 on the R&B album chart. The album was produced by producer Richard Perry. The LP yielded one top 40 hit, "Gettin' Ready for Love", reaching number 27 on the US Billboard Hot 100. Other charting singles released from the album include "You Got It" and "Your Love Is So Good for Me", the latter receiving a Grammy nomination.

The album also included cover versions of songs written and previously recorded by Stevie Wonder, Bill Withers and Melissa Manchester.

Adult Contemporary airplay drove the success of this album, with both "Gettin' Ready for Love" (#8) and "You Got It" (#9) being top 10 hits on that chart, while the newly formed Billboard Dance charts ranked "Your Love Is So Good for Me" at #15 in Billboard, which listed it together with the popular album cut "Top Of The World", for which an unreleased 12" mix (running time 5:50) was created in 1978 and considered for release as the 4th single from the album. Meanwhile, Record World magazine placed "Your Love Is So Good For Me" #7 on its Disco chart. Although this album never made the UK charts, it was certified silver for UK sales in excess of 60,000 copies.

Ross would continue to work with Perry including on her pairing with international vocalist Julio Iglesias on their duet, "All of You" several years later. He also remixed the Ross-penned song "So Close" for its 1983 single release.

The album was re-released in 2014 in an Expanded Edition with 11 extra tracks (in digital format only). The bonus tracks included 2014 mixes of a number of the original cuts (often in longer unedited versions with additional vocals) as well as four unreleased songs from the album sessions; "Brass Band", "Country John", "Room Enough for Two" and a cover version of Peter Frampton's 1975 hit "Baby, I Love Your Way".

== Critical reception ==
Professional ratings
Review scores
Source	Rating
AllMusic	3/5 stars
Christgau's Record Guide	C+
Rolling Stone	(Positive)

In 2017, Goldmine wrote that, "at its best, Baby It's Me breathed sufficient fresh air into her output that when she did go back to basics, with the Ashford-Simpson masterminded The Boss, the new aura remained in play."

== Track listing ==
No.	Title	Writer(s)	Length
1.	"Gettin' Ready for Love"	Tom Snow; Frannie Golde	2:45
2.	"You Got It"	Jerry Ragovoy; Linda Laurie	3:55
3.	"Baby It's Me"	Donald Dunn; Charles C. Smith	3:09
4.	"Too Shy to Say"	Stevie Wonder	3:15
5.	"Your Love Is So Good for Me"	Ken Peterson	4:14
6.	"Top of the World"	Snow	3:06
7.	"All Night Lover"	Ragovoy; Len Roberts	3:33
8.	"Confide in Me"	Melissa Manchester; Stanley Schwartz	3:32
9.	"The Same Love That Made Me Laugh"	Bill Withers	3:56
10.	"Come In from the Rain"	Carole Bayer Sager; Manchester	3:58

== Personnel ==
- Diana Ross – lead vocals (all tracks)
- James Newton Howard – keyboards, synthesizers (4)
- Tom Scott – saxophone solo (1)
- Bud Shank – flute (7)
- David Foster – horn arrangements, conductor (3)
- Clydie King – background vocals (6)
- Tom Snow – acoustic piano (1, 6), Fender Rhodes piano (7, 8, 10)
- Bobbye Hall – congas (7)
- Jack Ashford – percussion (1, 6), hotel sheet (3), tambourine (7)
- Ben Benay – guitar (9)
- Pattie Brooks – background vocals (2, 7)
- Ollie E. Brown – drums (9)
- Lenny Castro – percussion (2, 3, 9)
- Don Dunn – guitar (3)
- Scott Edwards – bass guitar (9)
- Chuck Findley – horn (5)
- Bryan Garofalo – bass guitar (8, 10)
- Ed Greene – drums (7)
- Jim Horn – horn (5)
- David Hungate – bass guitar (1–3, 6, 7)
- Bobby Kimball – background vocals (5)
- Becky Lewis – background vocals (2, 7)
- Steve Lukather – guitar (1, 6)
- Ira Newborn – guitar (7, 8, 10), horn arrangements, conductor (8)
- Michael Omartian – Fender Rhodes piano (2, 3)
- David Paich – Fender Rhodes piano (7, 9), acoustic piano (7), organ (5), vocals (5)
- Jeff Porcaro – drums (1–3, 5, 6), syndrums (all tracks)
- Ray Parker Jr. – bass guitar (5), guitar (2, 3, 5, 9)
- Ken Peterson – Fender Rhodes piano, synthesizers, clavinet (5)
- Petsye Powell – background vocals (2, 7)
- Lee Ritenour – guitar (2, 3, 8, 10)
- Stanley Schwartz – acoustic piano (8, 10)
- Rick Shlosser – drums (8, 10)
- Richie Zito – guitar (7)
- Sherlie Matthews – background vocals (6)
- Gene Page – string arrangements, conductor (1, 2, 6, 9)
- Del Newman – string arrangements, conductor (4, 6, 10)
- Richard Hewson – string arrangement, conductor

Technical (7)

- Howard Steele – recording and remix engineer
- David Larkham – art direction
- Victor Skrebneski – photography

== Charts ==
=== Weekly charts ===
Weekly chart performance for Baby It's Me
Chart (1977–78)	Peak position
Australian Albums (Kent Music Report)	81
Canada Top Albums/CDs (RPM)	15
US Billboard 200	18
US Top R&B/Hip-Hop Albums (Billboard)	7

=== Monthly charts ===
Monthly chart performance for Baby It's Me
Chart (1979)	Peak position
Soviet Albums (Moskovskij Komsomolets)	10

=== Year-end charts ===
Year-end chart performance for Baby It's Me
Chart (1977)	Position
Canada Top Albums/CDs (RPM)	97

== Certifications ==
Region	Certification	Certified units/sales
United Kingdom (BPI)	Silver	60,000^{^}
^{^} Shipments figures based on certification alone.
