= One Love in My Lifetime =

- Artwork for Dutch release

Single by Diana Ross

from the album Diana Ross
- B-side: "Smile"
- Released: August 11, 1976
- Recorded: 1975
- Genre: Pop
- Length: 3:39
- Label: Motown
- Songwriters: Terri McFaddin; Lawrence Brown; Leonard Perry
- Producer: Lawrence Brown

Diana Ross singles chronology
"Love Hangover" (1976)	"One Love in My Lifetime" (1976)	"Gettin' Ready for Love" (1977)

"One Love in My Lifetime" is a song recorded by American singer Diana Ross, taken from her 1976 second self-titled album, Diana Ross. The song was written by Lawrence Brown, Leonard Perry and Terri McFadden, produced by Brown and arranged by Wade Marcus.

The song was released as the fourth and final single from the album on August 11, 1976 by Motown Records. On the second side, the publishers posted "Smile", a cover version of a Charlie Chaplin song from the 1936 film Modern Times. The single rose to number 25 on Billboard's Hot 100 chart and number 10 on the Hot Soul Singles chart.

== Critical reception ==
The Cash Box magazine wrote: "A funky number, this is an intelligent followup to 'Love Hangover.' It shows off another facet of Ms. Ross' talents. The chorus is a strong hook, the music has a lot of texture, and there's an excellent vocal tradeoff near the end. It looks like this one is right on the mark; it's headed straight for the top."

== Charts ==
=== Weekly charts ===
Weekly chart performance for "One Love in My Lifetime"
Chart (1976)	Peak position
Canada Top 100 Singles (RPM)	24
Netherlands (Dutch Single Tip)	22
US Billboard Hot 100	25
US Hot Soul Singles (Billboard)	10
US Top Easy Listening (Billboard)	31
US Top 100 Singles (Cash Box)	34
US Top 100 R&B (Cash Box)	16
US The Singles Chart (Record World)	37
US The R&B Singles Chart (Record World)	11

=== Year-end charts ===
Year-end chart performance for "One Love in My Lifetime"
Chart (1976)	Peak position
Canada Top 200 Singles (RPM)	173
