= What You Gave Me =

1969 song by Ashford & Simpson

Single by Marvin Gaye and Tammi Terrell

from the album Easy
- B-side: "How You Gonna Keep It (After You Get It)"
- Released: November 1969
- Recorded: 1968–1969, Hitsville USA
- Genre: Soul
- Length: 2:38
- Label: Tamla
- Songwriter: Ashford & Simpson
- Producers: Ashford & Simpson

Marvin Gaye and Tammi Terrell singles chronology
"Good Lovin' Ain't Easy to Come By" (1969)	"What You Gave Me" (1969)	"The Onion Song" (1970)

Marvin Gaye singles chronology
"That's the Way Love Is" (1969)	"What You Gave Me" (1969)	"How Can I Forget/Gonna Give Her All the Love I've Got" (1969)

Tammi Terrell singles chronology
"Good Lovin' Ain't Easy to Come By" (1969)	"What You Gave Me" (1969)	"The Onion Song" (1970)

"What You Gave Me"

Single by Diana Ross

from the album Ross
- Released: 1978
- Genre: Soul, Disco
- Label: Motown Records
- Songwriter: Ashford & Simpson
- Producer: Hal Davis

Diana Ross singles chronology
"Lovin', Livin' and Givin'" (1978)	"What You Gave Me" (1978)	"Ease On down the Road" (1978)

"What You Gave Me" is a hit duet written and produced by Ashford & Simpson and issued as a single originally by the vocal duo of Marvin Gaye and Tammi Terrell in 1969 on the Tamla label.

Recorded in the final throes of the Gaye-Terrell duet recordings, the song became the second single from their album, Easy. As with much of the album, there is debate over who sang with Gaye: Terrell, who was undergoing treatment for brain cancer, or the track's co-writer and co-producer, Valerie Simpson.

While Gaye later insisted that Simpson stood in for Terrell, Simpson has maintained that Terrell took part in the recordings. Whatever the case, the song gave the duo a modest charting, peaking at number forty-nine pop and number six R&B.

Cash Box described it as a "finely honed vocal collaboration."

== Chart history ==
=== Weekly charts ===
Marvin Gaye and Tammi Terrell

Chart (1969–70)	Peak position
U.S. Billboard Hot 100	49
U.S. Billboard R&B	6
U.S. Cash Box Top 100	47

Diana Ross

Chart (1978)	Peak position
U.S. Billboard R&B	86

== Later versions ==
David Ruffin also recorded the song for his 1969 album Feelin' Good. It was revived years later as a club hit by Diana Ross in 1978. Her version peaked at #86 on the R&B charts.

== Credits ==
- All vocals by Marvin Gaye & Valerie Simpson
- Produced by Ashford & Simpson
- Instrumentation by The Funk Brothers
