= I Thought It Took a Little Time (But Today I Fell in Love) =

Single by Diana Ross

from the album Diana Ross
- Released: February 20, 1976
- Recorded: 1975
- Genre: Pop
- Length: 3:18
- Label: Motown
- Songwriter(s): Michael Masser; Pam Sawyer
- Producer(s): Michael Masser

Diana Ross singles chronology
"Theme from Mahogany (Do You Know Where You're Going To)" (1975)	"I Thought It Took a Little Time (But Today I Fell in Love)" (1976)	"Love Hangover" (1976)

"I Thought It Took a Little Time (But Today I Fell in Love)" is a song recorded by American singer Diana Ross taken from her 1976 second self-titled album, Diana Ross. The song was written by Michael Masser and Pam Sawyer, and produced by Masser. It was released as the album's second single on February 20, 1976 by Motown Records. The song reached number 4 on the Top Easy Listening chart.

== Critical reception ==
A reviewer for Billboard noted that this is an excellent ballad, somewhat reminiscent of the material from the time of the Supremes, although at first listening it may seem somewhat commercial. The Record World wrote: "Following the sweeping majesty of the Mahogany theme, Diana, with the help of a Gene Page arrangement, turns in another beautiful performance. She paces herself through this ballad with consummate ease and style." In another review by the same magazine, they stated that all the talents of Miss Ross were emphasized thanks to first-class production.

== Charts ==
Chart performance for "I Thought It Took a Little Time (But Today I Fell in Love)"
Chart (1976)	Peak position
Canada Top 100 Singles (RPM)	53
UK Singles (OCC)	32
US Billboard Hot 100	47
US Hot Soul Singles (Billboard)	61
US Easy Listening (Billboard)	4
US R&B Singles Chart (Record World)	53
