= Keep On Lovin' Me Honey =

Single by Marvin Gaye & Tammi Terrell

from the album You're All I Need
- B-side: "You Ain't Livin' Til You're Lovin'"
- Released: July 9, 1968
- Recorded: Hitsville USA, Detroit, Michigan; 1967
- Genre: R&B, soul
- Length: 2:34
- Label: Tamla; T 54173
- Songwriters: Nickolas Ashford; Valerie Simpson
- Producer: Ashford & Simpson

Marvin Gaye & Tammi Terrell singles chronology
"You're All I Need to Get By" (1968)	"Keep On Lovin' Me Honey" (1968)	"You Ain't Livin' till You're Lovin'" (1968)

Marvin Gaye singles chronology
"You're All I Need to Get By" (1968)	"Keep On Lovin' Me Honey" (1968)	"Chained" (1968)

Tammi Terrell singles chronology
"You're All I Need to Get By" (1968)	"Keep On Lovin' Me Honey" (1968)	"This Old Heart of Mine (Is Weak for You)" (1968)

"Keep On Lovin' Me Honey" is a 1968 hit written and produced by Nickolas Ashford & Valerie Simpson, and issued as a single on Motown Records' Tamla label by Marvin Gaye and Tammi Terrell. It was the third release from the duo's You're All I Need album. Billboard described the single as a "potent, driving rocker" that "will put [Gaye and Terrell] rapidly at the top." Cash Box said that it "blazes its way with terrific rhythmic impact and super-powered vocal splendor."

== Chart performance ==
Released a few months after the success of "You're All I Need to Get By", the song performed more modestly than that song, but still charted into the Billboard Hot 100's Top 40. "Keep On Lovin' Me Honey" peaked at number twenty-four on the chart, while reaching number eleven on the R&B singles chart.

== Personnel ==
- All vocals by Marvin Gaye and Tammi Terrell
- Written and produced by Nickolas Ashford & Valerie Simpson
- Instrumentation by The Funk Brothers
