= Michael and the Messengers =

1960s rock band from Winona, Minnesota

Michael and the Messengers were an American rock band active during the 1960s and early 1970s. They were originally formed in Minnesota as The Messengers and were re-formed in Milwaukee at Marquette University by the bassist Greg Jeresek. The group had regional hits on USA Records, and mild national success on Motown's Rare Earth label.

The Messengers began in Winona, Minnesota in 1962 as a high school band consisting of Greg Jeresek (aka Greg Jennings) on bass, guitarists Greg Bambenek and Roy Berger, keyboardist Chip Andrews, and drummer Jim Murray.

In 1965, the Milwaukee-based group consisted of Peter Barans (lead guitar), Greg Jeresek (bass), Jesse Roe (keyboards), Jeff Taylor (vocals), and Augie Jurishica (drums). This group released a cover of "In the Midnight Hour" that charted at No. 116, and shortly after signed with Motown Records. They then moved to Detroit where they had a few releases with Motown, including an eponymous album (produced by R. Dean Taylor) and a No. 132 chart single with "Window Shopping", and toured with the Supremes.

When the Messengers signed with Motown they could not promote or release a follow-up to "Midnight Hour" on the USA label, so a new group was formed, and additional singles were released as Michael and the Messengers. This group put out a cover of "Romeo and Juliet" in the style of the Messengers that charted at No. 129, but broke up shortly after.

In 1968, several of the members of the “Motown Messengers” left the group and, while still calling themselves The Messengers, consisted of Michael Morgan, Peter Barans (now going by the name Peter Barnes), Bob Cavallo, and John Hoier. Morgan and Barnes would team up again in 1976 along with Ted Medbury to form the short-lived pop group The Movies.

In 1971, this group of Messengers reached No. 62 in the US charts with "That's the Way a Woman Is". Perhaps due to the simplicity of the lyrics, the single was an even bigger hit in Japan (under the title "Ki ni naru onna no ko" 気になる女の子). This song had a small revival in 2005 in Japan due to its being used in an Otsuka Pharmaceutical's "Amino Value" sports drink commercial, and again in 2024 in Suzuki Hustler, micro SUV car commercial.

== Album ==
- The Messengers (Rare Earth RS 509), 1969

== Singles ==
=== The Messengers ===
- 1965: "My Baby" / "I've Seen You Around" (Soma 1427) (Note: Original Minnesota-based group formed by Greg Jeresek.)
- 1967: "Midnight Hour" / "Hard Hard Year" (USA 866) (Note: New group recreated at Marquette University by Greg Jeresek.)

=== Michael and the Messengers ===
- 1967: "Midnight Hour" / "Up Til News" (USA 866) (Note: Replacement group hired by USA Records.)
- 1967: "Romeo and Juliet" (Note: Included on Nuggets: Original Artyfacts from the First Psychedelic Era, 1965-1968.) / "LIFS (Don't Mean Nothin')" (USA 874)
- 1967: "She Was The Girl" / "Run and Hide" (USA 889)
- 1968: "Gotta Take It Easy" / "I Need Her Here" (USA 897)

=== The Messengers ===
- 1967: "Window Shopping" / "California Soul" (Soul S-35037) (Note: "Motown Messengers" signed after charting with USA Records.)
- 1970: "Right On" / "I Gotta Dance" (Home Made 01)
- 1970: "Louie Louie" / "The Letter" (Rare Earth C006-91 550, Germany)
- 1971: "That's The Way A Woman Is" / "In The Jungle" (Rare Earth R 5032) (Note: Released in Japan with "The Letter" b-side.)

Discography notes
