= The Onion Song =

- Germany picture sleeve

Single by Marvin Gaye and Tammi Terrell

from the album Easy
- B-side: "California Soul"
- Released: October 1969 (U.K.); March 20, 1970 (U.S.)
- Recorded: 1969, Detroit
- Genre: Soul; pop; Motown sound
- Label: Tamla
- Songwriter: Ashford & Simpson
- Producers: Ashford & Simpson

Marvin Gaye and Tammi Terrell singles chronology
| "What You Gave Me" (1969) | "The Onion Song" (1969) | "California Soul" (1970) |

Marvin Gaye singles chronology
| "How Can I Forget/Gonna Give Her All the Love I've Got" (1969) | "The Onion Song" (1969) | "California Soul" (1970) |

Tammi Terrell singles chronology
| "What You Gave Me" (1969) | "The Onion Song" (1969) | "California Soul" (1970) |

"The Onion Song" was a hit for soul singers Marvin Gaye and Tammi Terrell in 1969. It reached the top ten overseas, where it became Gaye & Terrell's biggest hit in the United Kingdom, entering the singles chart on 15 November 1969 and peaking at No.9 on 9 December. "The Onion Song" was a more modest hit in the U.S. where it peaked at No. 18 on the soul singles chart and No. 50 on the Billboard Hot 100 Both the A-side and the B-side, "California Soul", were written by Ashford & Simpson.

== Background ==
The song was originally intended for the Supremes but reassigned to Gaye and Terrell. Recording began in January 1969 with the recording of backing tracks. Gaye recorded his vocal on March 15 with further sessions two days later at the Golden World studio. Terrell was in a wheelchair and only recorded a guide vocal according to Valerie Simpson who was present at the recordings. Gaye later acknowledged the voice heard was Simpson and that Motown were aware of this but kept Terrell’s name on the label due to her failing health and the financial implications of removing her name.

Terrell died, aged 24, just prior to the song's release as a single in the U.S., on March 20, 1970 and it became her and Gaye's last official single together.

The song's lyrics reflect social consciousness, opening with the claim that: "The world is just a great big onion, And pain and fear are the spices that make you cry" and continuing with advice that: ".. the only way to get rid of this great big onion, Is to plant love seeds until it dies".

Record World called the song "a groovy, bouncy tune." Cash Box said it has a "brotherhood message with the rhythmic familiarity of past Marvin-Tammi hits."

== Chart performance ==
| Chart (1970) | Peak position |
|---|---|
| UK Singles (The Official Charts Company) | 9 |
| US Billboard Hot 100 | 50 |
| US Billboard Best Selling Soul Singles | 18 |

== Credits ==
- All vocals by Marvin Gaye and Tammi Terrell
- All instrumentation by The Funk Brothers
