= Tammi Terrell =

American singer-songwriter (1945–1970)

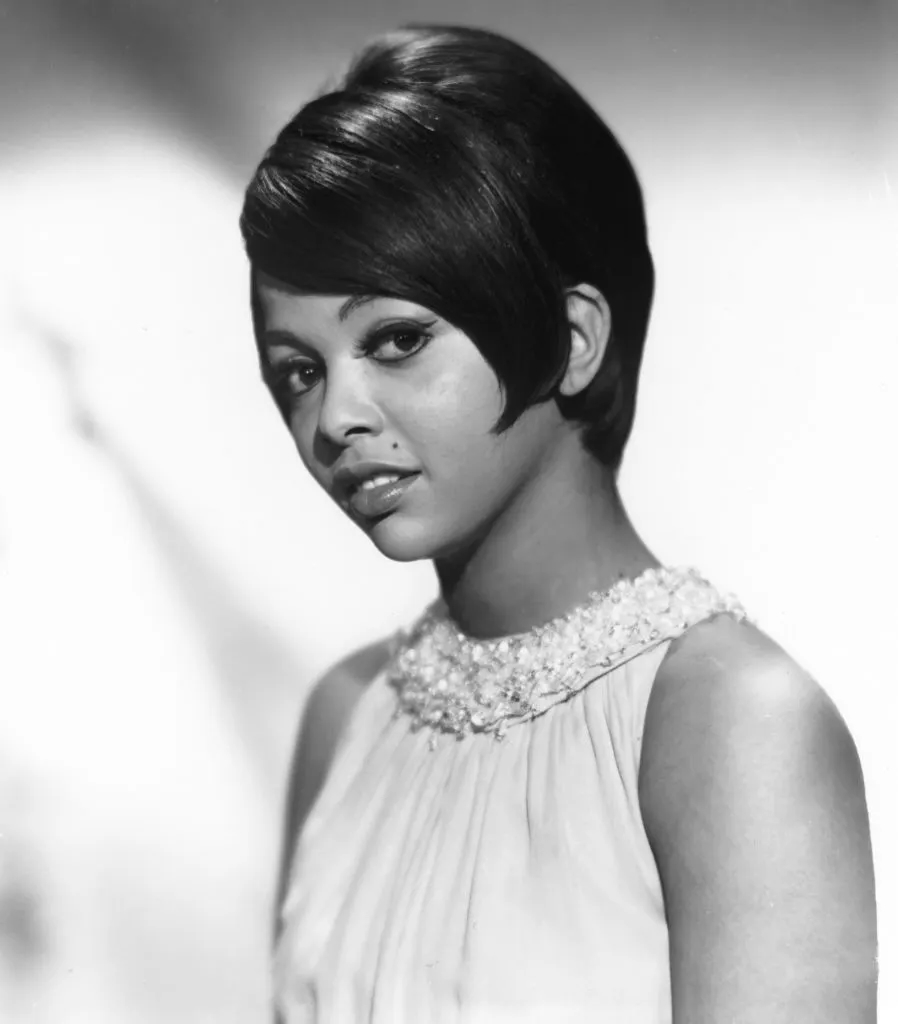
- Terrell in 1968
- Born: Thomasina Winifred Montgomery; April 29, 1945; Philadelphia, Pennsylvania, U.S.
- Died: March 16, 1970 (aged 24); Philadelphia, Pennsylvania, U.S.
- Resting place: Mount Lawn Cemetery, Sharon Hill, Pennsylvania, U.S.
- Occupation: Singer-songwriter
- Years active: 1960–1969
- Relatives: Bob Montgomery (uncle)
- Musical career
- Genres: R&B; soul
- Instrument: Vocals
- Labels: Scepter/Wand; Try Me; Checker; Motown; Tamla

Thomasina Winifred Montgomery (April 29, 1945 – March 16, 1970), professionally known as Tammi Terrell, was an American singer and songwriter, widely known as a star singer for Motown Records during the 1960s, notably for a series of duets with singer Marvin Gaye.

Terrell began her career as a teenager, first recording for Scepter/Wand Records, before spending nearly nine months as a member of James Brown's Revue, recording for Brown's Try Me label. After attending college, Terrell recorded briefly for Checker Records before signing with Motown in 1965. With Gaye, she scored seven Top 40 singles on the Billboard Hot 100, including "Ain't No Mountain High Enough", which was inducted into the Grammy Hall of Fame in 1999, "Ain't Nothing Like the Real Thing", and "You're All I Need to Get By".

Terrell's career was interrupted when she collapsed into Gaye's arms as the two performed at a concert at Hampden–Sydney College on October 14, 1967. Terrell was later diagnosed with a brain tumor and had eight unsuccessful surgeries before dying on March 16, 1970, at age 24.

== Early life ==
Thomasina Winifred Montgomery was born on April 29, 1945, in Philadelphia to Jennie (née Graham), and Thomas Montgomery. Jennie was an actress while Thomas was a barbershop owner and local politician. According to Terrell's sister, Ludie, their mother was mentally ill.

Terrell was the older of two siblings. According to the Unsung documentary, Ludie said her parents thought Terrell would be a boy and, therefore, she would be named after her father. When Terrell was born, the parents settled on the name Thomasina, nicknaming her "Tommie". At age 12, Terrell changed her name to "Tammy" after seeing the film Tammy and the Bachelor and hearing its theme song, "Tammy".

According to Ludie's book My Sister Tommie – The Real Tammi Terrell, Terrell was raped by three boys at age 11. Around this time, she began having migraine headaches. While it was not thought to be of significance at the time, family members later stated that these headaches might have been related to Terrell's later diagnosis of brain cancer.

Terrell attended Germantown High School in Philadelphia.

== Career ==
=== Early recordings ===
In 1960, Terrell signed under the Wand subsidiary of Scepter Records after being discovered by Luther Dixon. She recorded the ballad "If You See Bill" under the name Tammy Montgomery and did demos for the Shirelles. After another single, Terrell left the label. Having been introduced to James Brown, she signed a contract with him and began singing backup for his Revue concert tours. In 1961, Terrell created the group the Sherrys. In late 1962, Terrell was kicked out due to multiple disputes and after suffering violent abuse at the hands of Brown. Eventually, they went their separate ways, with the Sherrys moving on without Terrell. In 1963, she recorded the song "I Cried". Released on Brown's Try Me Records, it became her first charting single, reaching No. 99 on the Billboard Hot 100.

Terrell later signed with Checker Records and released the Bert Berns-produced "If I Would Marry You", a duet with Jimmy Radcliffe, which Terrell co-composed. Following this relative failure, Terrell announced a semi-retirement from the music business. Terrell enrolled in the University of Pennsylvania, where she majored in pre-med, staying at the school for two years. In the middle of this, Terrell was asked by Jerry Butler to sing with him in a series of shows in nightclubs. After Butler arranged to assure Terrell that she could continue her schooling, she began touring with Butler. In April 1965, during a performance at the Twenty Grand Club in Detroit, she was spotted by Motown CEO Berry Gordy, who promised to sign her to Motown.

Terrell agreed and signed with Motown on April 29, 1965, her 20th birthday. "I Can't Believe You Love Me" became Terrell's first R&B top 40 single, followed almost immediately by "Come On and See Me". In 1966, Terrell recorded the original versions of two future classics, Stevie Wonder's "All I Do (Is Think About You)" and The Isley Brothers' "This Old Heart of Mine (Is Weak for You)". After the release of her first single on Motown, Terrell joined the Motortown Revue opening for the Temptations and, later Smokey Robinson and the Miracles.

=== Success with Marvin Gaye ===
External audio
- Hear Tammi Terrell & Marvin Gaye sing "Ain't no Mountain High Enough" on YouTube

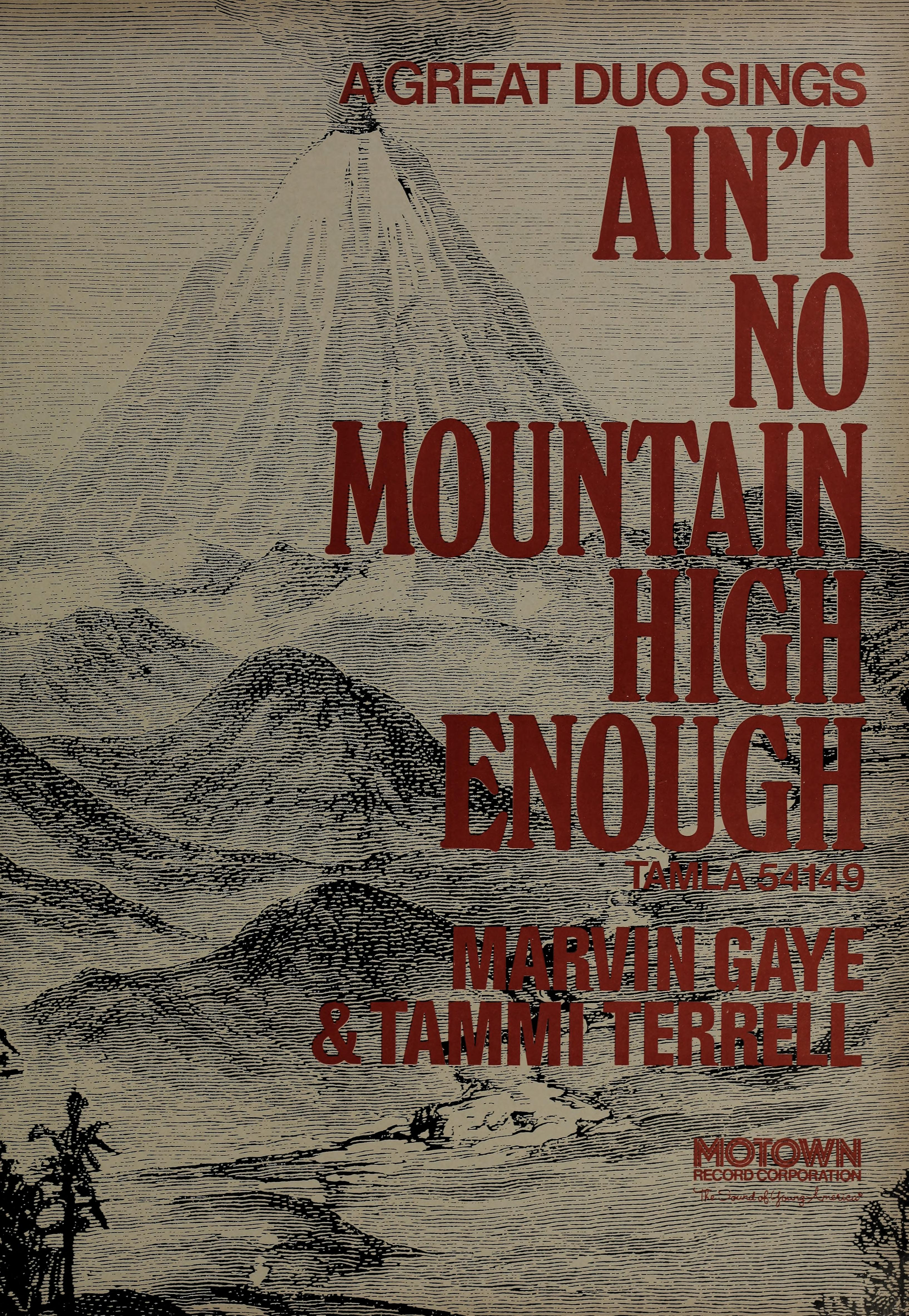
Cashbox advertisement, May 27, 1967

In early 1967, Motown hired Terrell to sing duets with Marvin Gaye, who had achieved duet success with Mary Wells and Kim Weston. Gaye recalled later that he did not know how gifted Terrell was until they began singing together. The duets were first recorded separately. For sessions of their first recording, the Ashford & Simpson composition "Ain't No Mountain High Enough", both Gaye and Terrell recorded separate versions. Motown remixed the vocals and edited out the background vocals, giving just Gaye and Terrell vocal dominance. The song became a crossover pop hit in the summer of 1967, reaching No. 19 on the Billboard Hot 100 and No. 3 on the R&B charts and making Terrell a star. Their follow-up, "Your Precious Love", became an even bigger hit, reaching No. 5 on the pop chart and No. 2 on the R&B chart. At the end of 1967, the duo scored another top-ten single with "If I Could Build My Whole World Around You", which peaked at No. 10 on the pop chart and No. 2 on the R&B chart. The song's B-side, the Marvin Gaye composition "If This World Were Mine", became a modest hit on both charts, No. 68 pop, No. 27 R&B. Gaye later cited the song as "one of Tammi's favorites". All four songs were included on Gaye and Terrell's first duet album, United, released in the late summer of 1967.

Throughout 1967, Gaye and Terrell began performing together, and Terrell became a vocal and performance inspiration for the shy and laid-back Gaye, who hated live performing. The duo also performed together on television shows to their hits. They were voted the No. 1 R&B duo in Cash Box magazine's Annual Year-End Survey in 1970. In 1967 the Funk Brothers supported Marvin Gaye & Tammi Terrell's live show as backing band.

=== Cancer diagnosis ===
While Terrell was being established as a star, the migraines and headaches she had suffered from since childhood were becoming more constant. While Terrell complained of pain, she insisted to people close to her that she was well enough to perform. However, on October 14, 1967, while performing "Your Precious Love" with Gaye at Hampden–Sydney College, just outside the town of Farmville, Virginia, Terrell collapsed into Gaye's arms onstage. Shortly after returning from Virginia, doctors diagnosed a malignant tumor on the right side of Terrell's brain. She underwent brain surgery at Graduate Hospital in Philadelphia on January 13, 1968.

After recovering from her first surgery, Terrell returned to Hitsville studios in Detroit and recorded "You're All I Need to Get By". Both that song and "Ain't Nothing Like the Real Thing" reached No. 1 on the R&B charts. Despite Terrell's optimism, her tumor worsened, requiring more surgeries. By 1969, Terrell had retired from live performances as doctors had ordered her not to perform due to her tumors. In early 1969, Motown issued Terrell's first and only solo album, Irresistible. She was too ill to promote the recordings. The album had no new repertoire, and all tracks had been recorded earlier and shelved for some time.

Marvin Gaye and Valerie Simpson gave different stories on how the production of Terrell's and Gaye's third and final album together, Easy, went about. According to reports, Terrell had become so ill due to her operations that she could not record, and Motown opted to have Simpson sub in for Terrell. This report was repeated in the book Marvin Gaye: What's Going On and the Last Days of the Motown Sound. Gaye would later say the move was "another moneymaking scheme on B.G.'s [Berry Gordy's] part."

Simpson, on the other hand, stated that the ailing Terrell was brought into the studio when she was strong enough to record over Simpson's guide vocals, insisting Terrell had sung on the album. Easy produced the singles "Good Lovin' Ain't Easy to Come By", "What You Gave Me", "California Soul", and the U.K. top-10 hit "The Onion Song". Late in 1969, Terrell made her final public appearance at the Apollo Theater, where Marvin Gaye was performing. As soon as Gaye spotted Terrell, he rushed to her side, and they began singing "You're All I Need to Get By" together. The crowd gave them a standing ovation.

== Personal life ==
"David [Ruffin] could sometimes be rough on a lady. You hear and see things when you're out on the road like we were. We all knew about Tammi and James Brown. We knew how James Brown was about women that he would flip a woman's ass. And back then, you wouldn't ever get the woman's side so that people would assume, fairly or not, he flipped her ass because she provoked him to."

— Otis Williams

In 1962, 17-year-old Terrell became involved in an abusive relationship with James Brown, who was 12 years her senior. One night on the road in 1963, Terrell left Brown after he assaulted her for not watching his entire performance. Bobby Bennett, former member of the Famous Flames, witnessed the incident. "He beat Tammi Terrell terribly. She was bleeding, shedding blood. Tammi left him because she didn't want her butt whipped", said Bennett.

During the Motortown Revue in 1966, Terrell embarked on a torrid romance with The Temptations lead singer David Ruffin. That year, Terrell accepted Ruffin's surprise marriage proposal. After Terrell announced their engagement onstage during an appearance together, she discovered that he was already married. Ruffin had a wife, three children, and another girlfriend in Detroit. This revelation and Ruffin's drug addiction led to violent arguments. Terrell told Ebony magazine in 1969 that she believed her emotional state during this relationship was a contributing factor to her headaches, which came after quarrels.

In 1967, Terrell ended their relationship after Ruffin hit her in the head with his motorcycle helmet. It was rumored that Ruffin also hit Terrell in the head with a hammer, which further complicated her unknown condition. This rumor was disputed in Terrell's Unsung episode.

At the time of Terrell's death, she was engaged to Ernie Garrett, a doctor at the hospital where she had been treated.

== Illness and death ==
Due to ongoing complications resulting from a brain tumor, by early 1970, Terrell was using a wheelchair, experienced blindness and hair loss, and weighed only 93 pounds (42 kg). Following an eighth operation on January 21, 1970, Terrell went into a coma. She never regained consciousness and died on March 16 at age 24. Terrell's funeral was held at the Janes Methodist Church in Philadelphia.

At the funeral, Gaye delivered a eulogy while "You're All I Need to Get By" was playing. According to Terrell's fiancé Ernie Garrett, who knew Gaye, Terrell's mother angrily barred everyone at Motown from the funeral, except for Gaye, who she felt was Terrell's closest friend. She blamed most of the label for failing to protect Terrell from David Ruffin during their relationship. Terrell was interred at Mount Lawn Cemetery in Sharon Hill, Pennsylvania.

Gaye reportedly never fully got over Terrell's death, according to several biographers who have stated that Terrell's death led him to depression and drug abuse. Additionally, Gaye's classic album What's Going On, a reflective, low-key work that dealt with mature themes, released in 1971, was in part a reaction to Terrell's death.

== Awards and nominations ==
Terrell and Marvin Gaye were nominated for Best Rhythm & Blues Group Performance, Vocal or Instrumental for their song "Ain't No Mountain High Enough" at the 10th Annual Grammy Awards in 1968. The song was later inducted into the Grammy Hall of Fame in 1999.

== Discography ==
=== Studio albums ===
Year	Album	Peak chart positions		Record label
Year	Album	US	US R&B	Record label
1967	The Early Show (with Chuck Jackson) ^{[A]}	—	—	Wand
1967	United (with Marvin Gaye)	69	7	Tamla
1968	You're All I Need (with Marvin Gaye)	60	4	Tamla
1969	Irresistible	—	39	Motown
1969	Easy (with Marvin Gaye)	184	—	Tamla
"—" denotes recordings that did not chart or were not released.

- ^{A} Side A is by Terrell, side B is by Jackson

=== Compilation albums ===
Year	Album	Peak chart positions			Record label
Year	Album	US	US R&B	UK	Record label
1970	Marvin Gaye and Tammi Terrell's Greatest Hits	171	17	60	Tamla
1980	Superstar Series Volume 2 (with Marvin Gaye)	—	—	—	Motown
2000	20th Century Masters – The Millennium Collection: The Best of Marvin Gaye & Tammi Terrell	—	—	—	Motown
2001	The Essential Collection	—	—	—	Spectrum
2001	The Complete Duets (with Marvin Gaye)	—	—	—	Motown
2010	Come On and See Me: The Complete Solo Collection	—	—	—	Hip-O Select
2011	Icon: Love Songs (with Marvin Gaye)	—	—	—	Motown
"—" denotes recordings that did not chart or were not released.

=== Singles ===
Year	Title	Peak chart positions					Certifications	Album
Year	Title	US	US R&B	AUS	CAN	UK	Certifications	Album
1961	"If You See Bill" ^{[B]}	—	—	—	—	—		The Early Show
1962	"Voice of Experience" ^{[B]}	—	—	—	—	—		The Early Show
1963	"I Cried" ^{[B]}	99	—	—	—	—		Non-album single
1964	"If I Would Marry You" ^{[B]}	—	—	—	—	—		Non-album single
1965	"I Can't Believe You Love Me"	72	27	—	—	—		Irresistible
1966	"Come On and See Me"	80	25	—	—	—		Irresistible
1967	"What a Good Man He Is"	—	—	—	—	—		Irresistible
1967	"Ain't No Mountain High Enough" (with Marvin Gaye)	19	3	63	—	80	US: 7× Platinum; GER: Gold; NZ: 5× Platinum; UK: 4× Platinum	United
1967	"Your Precious Love" (with Marvin Gaye)	5	2	92	—	—		United
1967	"If I Could Build My Whole World Around You" (with Marvin Gaye)	10	2	72	—	41		United
1968	"If This World Were Mine" (with Marvin Gaye)	68	27	—	—	—		United
1968	"Ain't Nothing Like the Real Thing" (with Marvin Gaye)	8	1	—	9	34		You're All I Need
1968	"You're All I Need to Get By" (with Marvin Gaye)	7	1	—	10	19		You're All I Need
1968	"Keep On Lovin' Me Honey" (with Marvin Gaye)	24	11	—	27	—		You're All I Need
1968	"This Old Heart of Mine (Is Weak for You)"	67	31	—	89	—		Irresistible
1969	"You Ain't Livin' till You're Lovin'" (with Marvin Gaye)	—	—	—	—	21		You're All I Need
1969	"Good Lovin' Ain't Easy to Come By" (with Marvin Gaye)	30	11	—	65	26		Easy
1969	"What You Gave Me" (with Marvin Gaye)	49	6	—	—	—		Easy
1969	"The Onion Song" (with Marvin Gaye)	50	18	—	—	9		Easy
1970	"California Soul" (with Marvin Gaye)	56	—	79	87	—		Easy
"—" denotes recordings that did not chart or were not released.

- ^{B} Credited to Tammy Montgomery.

== See also ==
- List of notable brain tumor patients
