= You Ain't Livin' till You're Lovin' =

Single by Marvin Gaye and Tammi Terrell

from the album You're All I Need
- Released: 1968
- Genre: Soul
- Label: Tamla-Motown
- Songwriters: Ashford, Simpson
- Producer: Ashford & Simpson

Marvin Gaye and Tammi Terrell singles chronology
"Keep On Lovin' Me Honey" (1968)	"You Ain't Livin' till You're Lovin'" (1968)	"Good Lovin' Ain't Easy to Come By" (1969)

Marvin Gaye singles chronology
"I Heard It Through the Grapevine" (1968)	"You Ain't Livin' till You're Lovin'" (1968)	"Good Lovin' Ain't Easy to Come By" (1969)

Tammi Terrell singles chronology
"This Old Heart of Mine (Is Weak for You)" (1968)	"You Ain't Livin' till You're Lovin'" (1968)	"Good Lovin' Ain't Easy to Come By" (1969)

"You Ain't Livin' till You're Lovin'" is a 1968 single released on the Tamla-Motown label by Motown vocal duo Marvin Gaye and Tammi Terrell.

The song gave the duo a boost in the UK where the single was released. Motown's stateside headquarters issued the song as the b-side to the hit "Keep On Lovin' Me Honey". The song eventually reached the top thirty on the UK Top 50 peaking at number twenty-one.

It was the fourth and final release from the duo's best-selling album You're All I Need, and was later covered by Diana Ross and the Supremes and The Marvelettes.

== Credits ==
- Lead vocals by Marvin Gaye and Tammi Terrell
- Backing vocals by The Andantes and The Originals
- Produced by Ashford & Simpson
- Instrumentation by The Funk Brothers
