= California Soul =

- Netherlands picture sleeve

Single by the Messengers
- A-side: "Window Shopping"
- Released: September 7, 1967
- Recorded: 1967
- Genre: Funk-soul
- Label: Soul
- Songwriter: Ashford & Simpson
- Producer: Jeffrey Bowen

The Messengers singles chronology
"Midnight Hour" (1967)	"California Soul" (1967)	"Right On" (1970)

Official audio
- "California Soul" on YouTube

"California Soul" is a funk-soul tune written by Ashford & Simpson, issued originally as the B-side of the Messengers' single "Window Shopping" in 1967 under the Motown group of labels.

== Other recordings ==
- Nick Ashford released his own version in June 1968 on Verve 10599.
- The song was then issued as a single by American pop quintet the 5th Dimension in late 1968.
- The song was also covered by Motown vocal duo Marvin Gaye and Tammi Terrell. It was Gaye's and Terrell's last single together when released in early 1970.
- A version appears on the 1970 studio album War & Peace by Edwin Starr (Gordy Records). Cash Box said that this version "glimmers with the special touch of a motor city arrangement and the vocal fuel ignited by this splendid team."
- Marlena Shaw recorded a version in 1969, which appears on her album The Spice of Life.
- Stone Throw Records recorded a version in 2021, which would later be included in the intro for the September 2021 Apple Event.

== Chart performance ==
Both the 5th Dimension's version and the Gaye-Terrell version were modest chart hits. The recording by the 5th Dimension performed better, reaching number 25 on the pop singles chart. Gaye and Terrell's cover was the B-side of "The Onion Song". The duo's version of "California Soul" reached number 50 pop but never charted on the US R&B chart. The duet was released after Terrell's death from a brain tumor in March 1970.

== Credits ==
=== The 5th Dimension version ===
- All vocals by the 5th Dimension: Billy Davis Jr., Marilyn McCoo, Florence LaRue, Lamonte McLemore, and Ron Townson
- Written by Ashford & Simpson
- Produced by Bones Howe

=== Marvin Gaye and Tammi Terrell version ===
- All vocals by Marvin Gaye and Tammi Terrell/ Valerie Simpson)
- Written and produced by Ashford & Simpson
- Instrumentation by the Funk Brothers

== Certifications and sales ==
=== Marlena Shaw version ===
Region	Certification	Certified units/sales
New Zealand (RMNZ)	Gold	15,000^{‡}
United Kingdom (BPI) Sales since 2004	Platinum	600,000^{‡}
^{‡} Sales+streaming figures based on certification alone.
