= You're All I Need to Get By =

1968 single by Marvin Gaye and Tammi Terrell

Single by Marvin Gaye and Tammi Terrell

from the album You're All I Need
- B-side: "Two Can Have a Party"
- Released: July 9, 1968
- Recorded: March 1968, Hitsville USA, Detroit, Michigan
- Genre: Soul
- Length: 2:48
- Label: Tamla; T 54169
- Songwriters: Nickolas Ashford; Valerie Simpson
- Producers: Harvey Fuqua; Johnny Bristol

Marvin Gaye and Tammi Terrell singles chronology
"Ain't Nothing Like the Real Thing" (1968)	"You're All I Need to Get By" (1968)	"Keep On Lovin' Me Honey" (1968)

Marvin Gaye singles chronology
"Ain't Nothing Like the Real Thing" (1968)	"You're All I Need to Get By" (1968)	"Keep On Lovin' Me Honey" (1968)

Tammi Terrell singles chronology
"Ain't Nothing Like the Real Thing" (1968)	"You're All I Need to Get By" (1968)	"Keep On Lovin' Me Honey" (1968)

"You're All I Need to Get By"

Single by Tony Orlando and Dawn

from the album To Be with You
- B-side: "I Know You Like a Book"
- Released: August 1975
- Recorded: 1975
- Genre: Easy listening
- Length: 4:08
- Label: Elektra
- Songwriters: Nickolas Ashford; Valerie Simpson
- Producers: Hank Medress; Dave Appell

Tony Orlando and Dawn singles chronology
"Mornin' Beautiful" (1975)	"You're All I Need to Get By" (1975)	"Skybird" (1975)

"You're All I Need to Get By" is a song recorded by the American R&B/soul duo Marvin Gaye and Tammi Terrell and released on Motown Records' Tamla label in 1968. It was the basis for the 1995 single "I'll Be There for You/You're All I Need to Get By" from Method Man and Mary J. Blige.

== Overview ==
Written by Nickolas Ashford & Valerie Simpson, it became one of the few Motown recordings of the 1960s that was not recorded with the familiar "Motown sound". Instead, "You're All I Need to Get By" had a more soulful and gospel-oriented theme surrounding it, that was influenced by the writers, who also sing background vocals on the recording, sharing vocals in a church choir in New York City. Marvin and Tammi recorded the song at Hitsville. Ashford & Simpson later stated how the session was hard as Terrell was recovering from surgery on the malignant brain tumor that ultimately caused her death less than two years after they recorded the song.

During moments in the recording, Gaye can be heard encouraging Terrell to sing her verses, ad-libbing "come on Tammi" several times. A year later, Gaye was performing this song with Stax vocalist Carla Thomas at the Apollo Theater, when Terrell, who was seated in the front row in her wheelchair, began singing along, prompting Gaye to leave the stage and sing the song with Terrell, who was offered a microphone. It was Terrell's final performance before her death in March 1970. The song was played during Terrell's funeral while Gaye gave a brief, tearful eulogy.

The original recording by Gaye and Terrell peaked at number seven on the Billboard Hot 100 and number-one on Billboard's Hot R&B/Soul Singles chart for five weeks, becoming one of the longest-running number one R&B hits of 1968 and the most successful duet recording of Marvin Gaye's career. It reached #19 on the British singles charts in late 1968, staying there for 19 weeks.

Billboard described the single as a "driving rhythm follow-up" to the duo's previous hit single "Ain't Nothing Like the Real Thing" which "will hit hard and fast." Cash Box called it a "tremendous ballad with a hearty beat," saying that the "scintillating opening excites listener response with an impending explosion that develops slowly unfolding solid performances."

== Personnel ==
- Lead vocals by Marvin Gaye and Tammi Terrell
- Background vocals by Ashford & Simpson
- Produced by Nicholas Ashford and Valerie Simpson
- Instrumentation by the Funk Brothers

== Charts ==
=== Weekly charts ===
Chart (1968)	Peak position
Canada RPM Top Singles	10
UK Singles (Official Charts)	19
UK R&B (Record Mirror)	1
US Billboard Hot 100	7
US Hot Rhythm & Blues Singles (Billboard)	1
US Cash Box Top 100	7

=== Year-end charts ===
Chart (1968)	Rank
U.S. Billboard Hot 100	82
U.S. Cash Box	82

== Certifications ==
Region	Certification	Certified units/sales
United Kingdom (BPI)	Silver	200,000^{‡}
^{‡} Sales+streaming figures based on certification alone.

== Johnny Mathis and Deniece Williams version ==
"You're All I Need to Get By"

Single by Johnny Mathis and Deniece Williams

from the album That's What Friends Are For
- B-side: "You're a Special Part of My Life"
- Released: July 1978
- Genre: Pop
- Length: 2:41
- Label: Columbia
- Composers: Nick Ashford, Valerie Simpson
- Producer: Jack Gold

Johnny Mathis and Deniece Williams singles chronology
"Too Much, Too Little, Too Late" (1978)	"You're All I Need to Get By" (1978)	"Love Won't Let Me Wait" (1984)

Johnny Mathis and Deniece Williams recorded "You're All I Need to Get By" for their 1978 duet album That's What Friends Are For. It was the follow-up to their U.S. #1 hit "Too Much, Too Little, Too Late".

Their version of "You're All I Need to Get By" peaked at #47 on the Billboard Hot 100, #10 on the Hot Soul Singles Chart, #16 on the Adult Contemporary chart, and #45 on the UK Singles Chart. It did best on the Canadian Adult Contemporary chart, where it reached #5.

== Critical reception ==
Billboard wrote, "The version here brings fresh spirit to the Ashford & Simpson number within a nicely crafted Jack Gold production."

== Charts ==
=== Chart history ===
==== Weekly charts ====
Chart (1978)	Peak position
Canada RPM Top Singles	52
Canada RPM Adult Contemporary	5
UK Singles (Official Charts)	45
US Billboard Hot 100	47
US Adult Contemporary (Billboard)	16
US Hot R&B/Hip-Hop Songs (Billboard)	10
US Cash Box Top 100	67

== Notable cover versions ==
- Aretha Franklin recorded the song as a single in 1971 (Atlantic 45-2787). The song was also included on her compilation album Aretha's Greatest Hits, released later the same year. Her version peaked at #19 on the Billboard Hot 100 and #3 on the Hot Soul Singles chart. It also features in a 2020 holiday advertisement for Walmart. This version of the song was featured in the 2024 film Deadpool & Wolverine and its soundtrack.
- Tony Orlando and Dawn's version became the third to reach the U.S. Top 40, peaking at #34 in 1975. It also reached #13 on the Adult Contemporary chart and #55 in Canada.
- Kathy Troccoli recorded her version on her debut album Stubborn Love in 1982. The lyrics had minor changes to make it fit into the CCM genre.
- The song was covered in the 2021 film CODA, which tells the story of the hearing child of deaf parents who discovers her own singing abilities. The song was performed as a duet by Emilia Jones and Ferdia Walsh-Peelo several times throughout the film.
