= Good Lovin' Ain't Easy to Come By =

Single by Marvin Gaye and Tammi Terrell

from the album Easy
- Released: January 14, 1969
- Recorded: 1968, Hitsville USA
- Genre: Soul
- Length: 2:50
- Label: Tamla
- Songwriter: Ashford & Simpson
- Producers: Ashford & Simpson

Marvin Gaye and Tammi Terrell singles chronology
"You Ain't Livin' till You're Lovin'" (1968)	"Good Lovin' Ain't Easy to Come By" (1969)	"What You Gave Me" (1969)

Marvin Gaye singles chronology
"You Ain't Livin' till You're Lovin'" (1968)	"Good Lovin' Ain't Easy to Come By" (1969)	"Too Busy Thinking About My Baby" (1969)

Tammi Terrell singles chronology
"You Ain't Livin' till You're Lovin'" (1968)	"Good Lovin' Ain't Easy to Come By" (1969)	"What You Gave Me" (1969)

"Good Lovin' Ain't Easy to Come By" is a duet released in 1969 on the Tamla label by singers Marvin Gaye and Tammi Terrell.

The first release off the duo's third album, Easy, it has been hugely debated whether or not an ailing Terrell, who was dying from a brain tumor, was on the track or if the song's co-writer, Valerie Simpson, subbed for Terrell.

In his biography, Divided Soul: The Life of Marvin Gaye, Marvin said Tammi was too ill to record, but Motown pushed for another Marvin/Tammi record. Marvin refused, calling it inhuman, until the label convinced him the album would cover for Terrell and her family, so Gaye and Simpson sung as if it were a Gaye/Terrell duet.

However, in Terrell's sister Ludie Montgomery's book, My Sister Tommie: The Real Tammi Terrell, Simpson reportedly denied she took part in the song saying Terrell was assisted to the studio to record her part. Whatever the reason, the song became an international top forty hit for the duo reaching number thirty on the pop chart and number twenty-six on the UK pop singles chart.

Cash Box praised the song's "belting rhythmic accompaniment, loverly lyric and the twosome's distinctive impact."

The recording was featured in the film The Boys in the Band.

== Personnel ==
- All vocals by Marvin Gaye and Valerie Simpson
- Produced and written by Ashford & Simpson
- Instrumentation by The Funk Brothers
