= Love Hangover =

Single by Diana Ross

from the album Diana Ross
- B-side: "Kiss Me Now"
- Released: March 16, 1976
- Recorded: 1975
- Genre: Disco; pop
- Length: 7:48; 3:46 (single edit)
- Label: Motown; M 1392
- Songwriters: Marilyn McLeod; Pamela Sawyer
- Producer: Hal Davis

Diana Ross singles chronology
| "I Thought It Took a Little Time (But Today I Fell in Love)" (1976) | "Love Hangover" (1976) | "One Love in My Lifetime" (1976) |

Official audio
- "Love Hangover" (album edit) on YouTube

"Love Hangover" is a song by the American singer Diana Ross, recorded in 1975 and released as a single on March 16, 1976. It was written by Marilyn McLeod and Pam Sawyer, and produced by Hal Davis. It rose to number one on the Billboard Hot 100 and Hot-Selling Soul Singles. It also hit number one on the Record World disco charts.

Producer Hal Davis instructed the song's engineer Russ Terrana to install a strobe light so that Ross could be in the "disco" mindset. As the song changed from ballad to uptempo, Ross became more comfortable with the material; she hummed, sang bit parts, laughed, danced around and even imitated Billie Holiday. The distinctive bassline is played by Henry E. Davis.

The song was first released on the album Diana Ross in February 1976. Motown initially promoted the album by releasing the single "I Thought It Took a Little Time". The vocal group the 5th Dimension released their own version of "Love Hangover" as a single, and Motown then issued Ross's version as a single. Both versions entered the chart the same day. By the time Ross's version of the song reached number one, Ross had reinvented herself as a disco diva and the 5th Dimension's version had peaked at number 80. It won Ross a Grammy nomination for Best Female R&B Vocal Performance. It appeared on the soundtrack of the following year's Diane Keaton movie Looking for Mr. Goodbar.

"Love Hangover" reached number one on May 29, 1976. That week, Casey Kasem reported on American Top 40 that Ross had broken the record for the most number-one hits by a female vocalist. With her fourth number one, she passed Connie Francis, Helen Reddy, Roberta Flack, and Cher, each of whom had three.

Ross performed the song on the April 4, 1980 episode of The Muppet Show during its fourth season.

The song was remixed several times. A version remixed by Eric Kupper, known as "Love Hangover 2020", hit number one on Billboard's Dance Club Songs chart in March 2020.

== Remixes ==
Motown released versions of Ross's version in 1988 (remixed by the British team PWL) and 1993 (remixed by Frankie Knuckles for the album Diana Extended: The Remixes and by Joey Negro for a single).

A promotion-only alternate mix of the original version was released on the deluxe edition of the album Diana in 2001.

Almighty Records released a remixed version in 2007 (remixed by the UK team Almighty).

New remixes were released in 2020 by Eric Kupper, peaking at number one on March 28 on the Billboard Dance Club chart. It marked the final number one single on the Dance Club Songs chart.

== Track listing ==
1993 UK 12" promo Side A

1. "Love Hangover" (Tribal Hangover) – 9:26
2. "Love Hangover" (Classic Club – EP version) – 8:20
3. "Love Hangover" (Tribal Reprise) – 5:25
4. "Your Love" – 3:58

Side B

1. "Upside Down" ('93 Remix – EP version) – 8:00
2. "Upside Down" (Dub 2 – Morales) – 7:37
3. "Someday We'll Be Together" ('93 Remix – EP version) – 8:40
4. "Someday We'll Be Together" (Final Sound Factory) – 6:54

== Cover versions ==
- In 1982, Scottish post-punk and pop band the Associates released the double A-side single "18 Carat Love Affair" / "Love Hangover" which peaked at No. 21 on the UK chart in 1982.
- British soul singer Pauline Henry (former lead vocalist of the Chimes) recorded a contemporary version of the track in 1995. It was a UK top 40 hit the same year.
- Italian dance act Black Box sampled the song on their 1996 disco-house single, "I Got the Vibration/Positive Vibration", which reached No. 21 in the UK and No. 18 in Italy.
- The song was sampled in Monica's 1998 hit "The First Night", which reached No. 1 on the Billboard Hot 100.
- American singer Beyoncé added the song to her historic headlining 2011 Glastonbury Festival Performance (then sung by her background vocalists "The Mamas"), and in 2023 her backup singers "Pure Honey" performed the song nightly on her Renaissance World Tour, including a special performance accompanying Ross on Beyonce's birthday.

== Charts ==
=== Weekly charts ===
Weekly chart performance for "Love Hangover"
| Chart (1976) | Peak position |
|---|---|
| Australia (Kent Music Report) | 67 |
| Belgium (Ultratop 50 Wallonia) | 44 |
| Canada Top Singles (RPM) | 9 |
| Canada Adult Contemporary (RPM) | 5 |
| France (IFOP) | 30 |
| Ireland (IRMA) | 11 |
| Italy (Musica e dischi) | 16 |
| Netherlands (Dutch Top 40) | 23 |
| Netherlands (Single Top 100) | 18 |
| New Zealand (Recorded Music NZ) | 28 |
| UK Singles (Official Charts) | 10 |
| US Billboard Hot 100 | 1 |
| US Adult Contemporary (Billboard) | 19 |
| US Dance Club Songs (Billboard) | 1 |
| US Hot Soul Singles (Billboard) | 1 |

=== Year-end charts ===
Year-end chart performance for "Love Hangover"
| Chart (1976) | Position |
|---|---|
| Canada Top Singles (RPM) | 101 |
| UK Singles (OCC) | 92 |
| US Billboard Hot 100 | 15 |
| US Cash Box Top 100 | 13 |

== See also ==
- List of Hot 100 number-one singles of 1976 (U.S.)
- List of number-one R&B singles of 1976 (U.S.)
- List of number-one dance singles of 1976 (U.S.)
- List of number-one dance singles of 2020 (U.S.)
