= Anita O'Day discography =

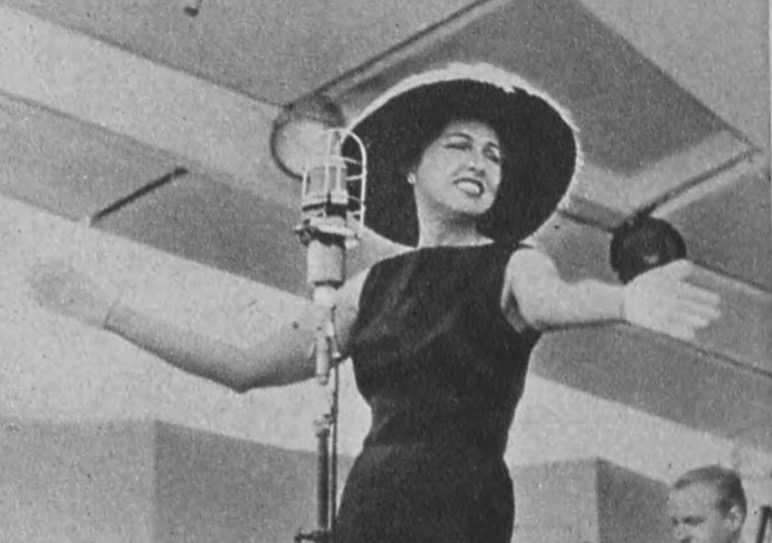
- Anita O'Day in performance, 1958.
- Studio albums: 24
- Extended plays: 14
- Live albums: 12
- Compilation albums: 19
- Singles: 37
- Box sets: 1

The discography of American singer, Anita O'Day, contains 24 studio albums, 12 live albums, 19 compilation albums, one box set, 14 extended plays (EP's) and 37 singles. Her first recordings were released as a featured vocalist in big bands, beginning with Gene Krupa and His Orchestra in 1941. Among her six debut releases, "Georgia on My Mind", "Just a Little Bit South of North Carolina" and "Let Me off Uptown" made the US pop chart, with the latter two making the top-10. O'Day had her highest-peaking US pop single with the number four "And Her Tears Flowed Like Wine", recorded with Stan Kenton and His Orchestra in 1944. She returned to Krupa in 1945 and had two more US top-10 singles with "Chickery Chick" (1945) and "Boogie Blues" (1946). O'Day was then included on singles released by orchestras like Will Bradley, Ralph Burns and Benny Carter. In collaboration with the All Stars, she reached number 24 on the US pop chart in 1951 with "Tennessee Waltz".

O'Day's first studio albums were released in the 1950s decade, beginning with Songs by Anita O'Day (1954). The Verve record label issued 13 studio albums by O'Day between 1956 and 1964, beginning with Anita. At Verve, she was joined by several collaborators including Billy May on Anita O'Day Swings Cole Porter with Billy May (1959), Jimmy Giuffre on Cool Heat (1959) and Cal Tjader on Time for 2 (1962). The label also issued her first live album in 1958 titled Anita O'Day at Mister Kelly's. Following her Verve albums, O'Day's next release would also be a live album titled Anita O'Day in Berlin (1971). The Trio label (based in Japan) issued two studio albums by O'Day during this time: Anita 1975 (1975) and My Ship(1976). The company also issued three live albums during the same period, including Live in Tokyo, 1975 (1976).

In 1979, the GNP Crescendo label released the studio album Mello'day, followed by the Emily label releasing several albums during the 1980s like Live at the City (1980), The Night Has a Thousand Eyes (1982) and A Song for You (1984). A live album of O'Day's 1963 Japanese concert was issued by Polydor Records in 1985 titled Anita O'Day in Tokyo '63. Her final live album was issued in 1991 called At Vine St. Live. Studio albums by O'Day continued being issued, including In a Mellow Tone (1989), Rules of the Road (a 1993 collaboration with the Jack Sheldon Orchestra) and her final release Indestructible! (2006). Her 2013 compilation, Four Classic Albums, made the top 20 of the UK Jazz and Blues Chart.

== Albums ==
=== Studio albums ===
List of studio albums, showing all relevant details
Title	Album details
Songs by Anita O'Day	Released: 1954; Label: Norgran; Formats: LP
Anita	Released: March 1956; Label: Verve; Formats: LP
Pick Yourself Up with Anita O'Day	Released: February 1957; Label: Verve; Formats: LP
Anita Sings the Most (with the Oscar Peterson Quartet)	Released: April 1958; Label: Verve; Formats: LP
Anita O'Day Sings the Winners	Released: 1958; Label: Verve; Formats: LP
Anita O'Day Swings Cole Porter with Billy May (with Billy May)	Released: 1959; Label: Verve; Formats: LP
Cool Heat (with Jimmy Giuffre)	Released: 1959; Label: Verve; Formats: LP
Anita O'Day and Billy May Swing Rodgers and Hart (with Billy May)	Released: 1960; Label: Verve; Formats: LP
Waiter, Make Mine Blues	Released: 1961; Label: Verve; Formats: LP
Trav'lin Light	Released: 1961; Label: Verve; Formats: LP
All the Sad Young Men	Released: 1962; Label: Verve; Formats: LP
Time for 2 (with Cal Tjader)	Released: 1962; Label: Verve; Formats: LP
Anita O'Day & the Three Sounds (with The Three Sounds)	Released: 1963; Label: Verve; Formats: LP
Incomparable!	Released: 1964; Label: Verve; Formats: LP
Anita and Rhythm Section	Released: 1971; Label: Anita O'Day/Glendale; Formats: LP
Anita 1975	Released: 1975; Label: Trio; Formats: LP
My Ship	Released: 1976; Label: Trio; Formats: LP
There's Only One	Released: 1978; Label: Dobre; Formats: LP
Mello'day	Released: 1979; Label: GNP Crescendo; Formats: LP
The Night Has a Thousand Eyes	Released: 1982; Label: Emily/Lob; Formats: LP
A Song for You	Released: 1984; Label: Emily; Formats: LP, cassette
In a Mellow Tone	Released: 1989; Label: DRG; Formats: CD, cassette
Rules of the Road (with the Jack Sheldon Orchestra)	Released: 1993; Label: Pablo; Formats: CD
Indestructible!	Released: April 18, 2006; Label: Kayo Stereophonic; Formats: CD

=== Live albums ===
List of live albums, showing all relevant details
Title	Album details
Anita O'Day at Mister Kelly's	Released: 1958; Label: Verve; Formats: LP
Anita O'Day in Berlin	Released: 1971; Label: BASF/MPS; Formats: LP
Live in Tokyo, 1975	Released: 1976; Label: Trio; Formats: LP
Live at Mingo's	Released: 1976; Label: Trio; Formats: LP
Skylark – Live at Sometime	Released: 1978; Label: Trio; Formats: LP
Live at the City	Released: 1980; Label: Emily; Formats: LP
Live at the City: The Second Set	Released: 1982; Label: Emily; Formats: LP
Ao Vivo No 150 Night Club	Released: 1984; Label: Estúdio Eldorado; Formats: LP
Anita O'Day in Tokyo '63	Released: 1985; Label: Polydor; Formats: LP
SS 'Wonderful Big Band Concert 1985	Released: 1985; Label: Emily; Formats: LP
Live at Ronnie Scott's, London	Released: 1986; Label: Wadham/Hendring; Formats: CD
At Vine St. Live	Released: 1991; Label: Disques Swing; Formats: CD

=== Compilation albums ===
List of compilation albums, with selected chart positions, and other relevant details
Title	Album details	Peak chart positions
Title	Album details	UK Jazz & Blues
Anita O'Day Specials	Released: 1951; Label: Signature; Formats: LP	—
Singin' and Swingin' with Anita O'Day	Released: 1953; Label: Coral; Formats: LP	—
Anita O'Day Collates	Released: September 1953; Label: Clef; Formats: LP	—
The Lady Is a Tramp	Released: 1957; Label: Verve; Formats: LP	—
The Girl Friends (with Toni Arden, Peggy King, Peggy Lee and Dinah Shore)	Released: 1959; Label: Columbia/Harmony; Formats: LP	—
The Jazz Stylings of Anita O'Day	Released: 1966; Label: Verve; Formats: LP	—
Drum Boogie (as Gene Krupa and His Orchestra featuring Anita O'Day)	Released: 1972; Label: CBS; Formats: LP	—
Kenton's Girl Friends (Stan Kenton with various artists)	Released: 1973; Label: Capitol; Formats: LP	—
Gene Krupa, His Orchestra and Anita O'Day featuring Roy Eldridge (with Gene Krupa and Roy Eldridge)	Released: 1974; Label: Columbia; Formats: LP	—
The Big Band Sessions	Released: 1979; Label: Verve; Formats: LP, cassette	—
Uptown (as Roy Eldridge with the Gene Krupa Orchestra featuring Anita O'Day)	Released: 1990; Label: CBS; Formats: LP, CD, cassette	—
I Told Ya I Love Ya, Now Get Out	Released: 1991; Label: Sony Special Products; Formats: CD, cassette	—
Compact Jazz: Anita O'Day	Released: 1993; Label: Verve; Formats: CD	—
Verve Jazz Masters 49	Released: 1995; Label: Verve; Formats: CD	—
Jazz 'Round Midnight	Released: 1997; Label: Verve; Formats: CD	—
Let Me Up Off Uptown	Released: 1999; Label: Columbia; Formats: CD	—
Anita O'Day's Finest Hour	Released: 2000; Label: Verve; Formats: CD	—
The Diva	Released: 2003; Label: Verve; Formats: CD	—
Four Classic Albums	Released: 2013; Label: Avid; Formats: CD	19
"—" denotes a recording that did not chart or was not released in that territory.

== Extended plays ==
List of extended plays (EPs), showing all relevant details
Title	Album details
Pagan Love Song	Released: 1952; Label: Clef; Formats: 10" EP
Drum Boogie (Gene Krupa featuring Anita O'Day and Roy Eldridge)	Released: 1956; Label: Verve; Formats: 7" EP
Anita	Released: 1956; Label: Verve; Formats: 7" EP
Boogie Blues (Gene Krupa featuring Anita O'Day)	Released: 1957; Label: Columbia; Formats: 7" EP
Pick Yourself Up with Anita O'Day	Released: 1957; Label: Verve; Formats: 7" EP
Anita O'Day Sings the Winners	Released: 1958; Label: Verve; Formats: 7" EP
The Lady Is a Tramp	Released: 1958; Label: Karusell; Formats: 7" EP
Pick Yourself Up with Anita O'Day	Released: 1959; Label: Verve; Formats: 7" EP
Pick Yourself Up with Anita O'Day	Released: 1959; Label: Verve; Formats: 7" EP
Anita O'Day Swings Cole Porter with Billy May (with Billy May)	Released: 1959; Label: Verve; Formats: 7" EP
At Mister Kelly's	Released: 1959; Label: Karusell; Formats: 7" EP
Jazz a Newport	Released: 1960; Label: Barclay/Verve; Formats: 7" EP
Eee-o-Eleven	Released: 1960; Label: Barclay/Verve; Formats: 7" EP
The Moon Looks Down and Laughs	Released: 1961; Label: Verve; Formats: 7" EP

== Box sets ==
List of box sets, showing all relevant details
Title	Album details
The Complete Anita O'Day Verve-Clef Sessions	Released: 1999; Label: Mosaic; Formats: 9-CD box set

== Singles ==
List of singles, with selected chart positions, showing other relevant details
Title	Year	Peak chart positions	Album
Title	Year	US	Album
"Georgia on My Mind" (with Gene Krupa and His Orchestra)	1941	18	non-album singles
"Just a Little Bit South of North Carolina" (with Gene Krupa and His Orchestra)	1941	9	non-album singles
"Let Me off Uptown" (with Gene Krupa, His Orchestra and Roy Eldridge)	1941	10	non-album singles
"Stop! The Red Light's On" (with Gene Krupa and His Orchestra)	1941	—	non-album singles
Two in Love" (with Gene Krupa and His Orchestra)	1941	—	non-album singles
"Thanks for the 'Boogie' Ride" (with Gene Krupa and His Orchestra)	1941	—	non-album singles
"Rumba Fox Trot" (with Gene Krupa and His Orchestra and Howard DuLany)	1942	—	non-album singles
"Skylark" (with Gene Krupa and His Orchestra)	1942	—	non-album singles
"Pass the Bounce" (with Gene Krupa and His Orchestra)	1942	—	non-album singles
"Fightin' Doug MacArthur" (with Gene Krupa and His Orchestra)	1942	—	non-album singles
"That's What You Think" (with Gene Krupa and His Orchestra)	1942	—	non-album singles
"Massachusetts" (with Gene Krupa and His Orchestra)	1942	—	non-album singles
"Side by Side" (with Gene Krupa and His Orchestra)	1944	—	non-album singles
"And Her Tears Flowed Like Wine" (with Stan Kenton and His Orchestra)	1944	4	non-album singles
"Gotta Be Gettin'" (with Stan Kenton and His Orchestra)	1944	—	non-album singles
"Are You Livin' Old Man" (with Stan Kenton and His Orchestra)	1945	—	non-album singles
"(Did You Ever Get) That Feeling In The Moonlight" (with Gene Krupa and His Orchestra)	1945	—	non-album singles
"Chickery Chick" (with Gene Krupa and His Orchestra)	1945	10	non-album singles
"Harriet (A Western Novelty Song)" (with Gene Krupa and His Orchestra)	1945	—	non-album singles
"Hop, Skip, and Jump" (with Gene Krupa and His Orchestra)	1946	—	non-album singles
"Boogie Blues" (with Gene Krupa and His Orchesatra)	1946	9	non-album singles
"Opus No. 1" (with Gene Krupa and His Orchestra)	1947	—	non-album singles
"Ace in the Hole" (with Alvin and His Little Band)	1947	—	non-album singles
"What Is This Thing Called Love" (with Will Bradley and His Orchestra)	1947	—	non-album singles
"Travelin' Man" (with Stan Kenton and His Orchestra)	1948	—	non-album singles
"How High the Moon" (with Ralph Burns and His Orchestra)	1948	—	non-album singles
"I Ain't Gettin' Any Younger" (with Benny Carter and His Orchestra)	1948	—	non-album singles
"Blues for Bojangles" (with Paul Jordan and His Orchestra)	1950	—	non-album singles
"Tennessee Waltz" (as Anita O'Day with the All Stars)	1950	24	non-album singles
"I Apologize"	1951	—	non-album singles
"Pagan Love Song"	1953	—	Anita O'Day Sings Jazz
"Vaya Con Dios"	1953	—	Anita O'Day Sings Jazz
"Rock and Roll Waltz"	1956	—	Pick Yourself Up with Anita O'Day
"The Getaway and the Chase"	1956	—	Pick Yourself Up with Anita O'Day
"You're the Top"	1956	—	Anita
"Night and Day"	1959	—	Anita O'Day Swings Cole Porter with Billy May
"Ain't No Big Thing"	1966	—	non-album singles
"The Easy Life"	1988	—	non-album singles
"—" denotes a recording that did not chart or was not released in that territory.
