= Incomparable! =

Studio album by Anita O'Day
- Released: 1964
- Recorded: August 1960
- Studio: Radio Recorders
- Genre: Vocal jazz; swing
- Label: Verve

Anita O'Day chronology
Anita O'Day & the Three Sounds (1963)	Incomparable! (1964)	Anita O'Day in Berlin (1971)

Incomparable! is a studio album by American singer, Anita O'Day. It was released in 1964 by Verve Records and was the fifteenth studio project of her career. It contained a total of 12 songs that featured swing and jazz arrangements of "Old Devil Moon" and "Slaughter on Tenth Avenue". It was met with positive critical reception from publications like DownBeat and authors like Gary Giddins. It has been re-released several times on different formats since its original distribution.

== Background, recording and content ==
Anita O'Day first gained notoriety as a featured vocalist in big bands by Gene Krupa and Stan Kenton. Her vocals were featured on 1940s hits like "Boogie Blues", "Let Me off Uptown" and "And Her Tears Flowed Like Wine". She then became known in the jazz community for a series of albums made for the Verve label during the 1950s and 1960s. Incomparable! was among the albums O'Day recorded for Verve during the 1960s. The project was cut at the Radio Recorders studio in Hollywood, California in sessions on August 16, August 18, and August 23, 1960. Arrangements were crafted by Bill Holman, "a big band orchestrator" according to jazz biographer, Walt Friedwald. The project consisted of 12 tracks, featuring a mix of swing numbers and ballads. Among its ballads was "The Party's Over", a song first featured in the Broadway production, Bells Are Ringing. Other songs included Richard Rodgers's "Slaughter on Tenth Avenue", along with pop covers of "Old Devil Moon", "Speak Low" and "Why Shouldn't I?".

== Critical reception ==
Professional ratings
Review scores
Source	Rating
AllMusic	3/5 stars
DownBeat	4.5/5 stars

Incomparable! received positive reviews from critics and music publications following its original release. DownBeat rated it at four and a half stars, finding that despite there being "no really wild moments of jazz excitement", there was many songs that featured sophisticated arrangements and performances. Walt Friedwald in his book A Biographical Guide to the Great Jazz and Pop Singers called it a project of "high octane swingers, delivered with bop era voicings". Negro Digest found that "O'Day has seldom sounded in better voice than on this album." The publication also believed that O'Day's voice on "Easy Living" sounded similar to that of Billie Holiday. Author Gary Giddins of the book Weather Bird also found a similarity to Holiday on certain tracks, such as on "It Could Happen to You" or on "Indian Summer". Although no formal review was given, AllMusic rated Incomparable! three out of five stars.

== Releases ==
Incomparable! was originally released by Verve Records in 1964 and was the thirteenth studio album released by the label. It was also the fifteenth studio album of her career. It was first offered as a vinyl LP in either mono or stereo versions. Six tracks were placed on either side of the LP. It was then re-released on May 21, 2002, as a compact disc as part of Verve's "LP Reproduction" series. It was also digitally remastered and included information about session players and recording dates. It was later made available to digital retailers and markets, including Apple Music.

== Track listing ==
Side one
No.	Title	Writer(s)	Length
1.	"It Could Happen to You"	Burke; Van Heusen	2:34
2.	"Blue Champagne"	Watts; Ryerson	2:35
3.	"Avalon"	Rose; Jolson; DeSylva	2:12
4.	"Old Devil Moon"	Harburg; Lane	3:01
5.	"The Party's Over"	Comden; Green; Styne	3:10
6.	"Why Shouldn't I?"	Porter	3:06

Side two
No.	Title	Writer(s)	Length
1.	"Easy Living"	Leo Robin; Rainger	3:18
2.	"Can't We Be Friends?"	James; Swift	2:14
3.	"Slaughter on 10th Avenue"	Rodgers–Hart	5:45
4.	"If I Love Again"	Oakland; Murray	2:46
5.	"Speak Low"	Weill; Nash	3:02
6.	"Indian Summer"	Herbert; Dubin	3:13

== Personnel ==
All credits are adapted from the 2002 liner notes of Incomparable!.

Musical personnel

- Conte Candoli – Trumpet
- Bob Edmonson – Trombone
- Al Hendrickson – Guitar
- Richie Kamuca – Tenor saxophone
- Charlie Kennedy – Saxophone
- Mel Lewis – Drums
- Lou Levy – Piano
- Joe Maini – Saxophone
- Lou McCreary – Trombone
- Joe Mondragon – Bass
- Jack Nimitz – Baritone saxophone
- Anita O'Day – Lead vocals
- Bill Perkins – Tenor saxophone
- Al Porcino – Trumpet
- Frank Rosolino – Trombone
- Kenny Shroyer – Bass Trombone
- Ray Triscari – Trumpet
- Stu Williamson – Trumpet

Technical personnel

- John Engstead – Photography
- Bill Holman – Conductor, arranger
- Val Valentin – Director of engineering
- John Vorhees – Liner notes

== Release history ==
Release history and formats for Incomparable!
Region	Date	Format	Label	Ref.
Various	1964	LP mono; LP stereo	Verve Records	
Italy	1965	LP mono	Verve Records	
Japan	1983	LP stereo	Verve Records	
Various	May 21, 2002	Compact disc	Verve Records	
Various	March 7, 2007	Compact disc	Verve Records	
Various	Circa 2020	Music download; streaming	Verve Records	
