= Joe Greene (American songwriter) =

American songwriter and novelist (1915–1986)

- Greene in Jet magazine, May 15, 1952
- Born: Joseph Perkins Greene; 19 April 1915; Spokane, Washington, US
- Died: 16 June 1986 (aged 71); Pasadena, California, US
- Occupations: Songwriter, composer
- Known for: "Across the Alley from the Alamo"

Joseph Perkins Greene (April 19, 1915 – June 16, 1986) was an American songwriter, best known for "Across the Alley from the Alamo", "And Her Tears Flowed Like Wine" (1944), and "Don't Let the Sun Catch You Cryin'" (1946).

== Life ==
Greene became a singer and actor. As a young man Greene was associated with songwriter Hoagy Carmichael. He is said to have discovered Ernie Andrews in 1945 and produced his first sessions. He wrote Andrews' biggest hit, the song "Soothe Me". Greene's lyrics were stylish and often had strong emotional impact.

The idea for "Across the Alley from the Alamo" came to Greene in 1946 in the middle of the night. He had been writing songs for Nat King Cole, and visited Cole's manager the next morning, who thought the song had potential. Mel Tormé made a demo, then the Mills Brothers made a hit recording. This was soon followed by a version by Woody Herman and his Orchestra, sung by Woody Herman with The Four Chips, and a version by Stan Kenton and his Orchestra, sung by June Christy.

Greene collaborated as composer and lyricist with bandleader and pianist Stan Kenton and arranger Pete Rugolo, making the Kenton band one of the most popular in America in the 1940s and 1950s. He collaborated as a lyricist with Stan Kenton on "And Her Tears Flowed Like Wine" and "I'm Going Mad for a Pad" in 1946. The band's musical style was a precursor to West Coast jazz. In 1952 Greene was working with pianist and arranger Eddie Beal, who had accompanied Herb Jeffries and Toni Harper, on new music for the Kenton "aggregation". June Christy and Chris Connor, vocalists with Kenton's band, performed hit songs by Greene such as "Across the Alley from the Alamo", "And Her Tears Flowed Like Wine" and "Don't Let the Sun Catch You Cryin'".

Greene's songs were recorded by artists such as Ella Fitzgerald, Carmen McRae, Julie London, Fats Waller, Ray Charles and Dinah Washington. The Muppets recorded one of his songs.

His "Read My Lips" was recorded in 1958 by the Russ Garcia orchestra for Liberty Records, possibly the origin of the statement "Read my lips—no new taxes" by George H. W. Bush at the 1988 Republican National Convention. In the 1960s and 1970s Greene worked on feature film scripts and music. Greene also wrote the novel House of Pleasure (1967).

Greene wrote the soundtrack for the film Psychedelic Sexualis, also called On Her Bed of Roses (1966), about a violent sociopath. It has been described as "a bizarre concoction of proto-psychedelic jams ("The Boozer"), beat jazz ("The Bar Fly"), and experimental percussive abstractions ("Theme" and "Walk to Hell").

Joe Greene died of kidney failure on 16 June 1986 in a hospital in Pasadena, California, aged 71. He was survived by his wife, Marthella, three children and four grandchildren.

== Selected songs ==
- "And Her Tears Flowed Like Wine" (1944) Words. Music by Stan Kenton and Charles Lawrence.
  - The 1944 version by Stan Kenton and His Orchestra, vocals by Anita O'Day, reached number 3 on the Billboard chart.
  - The 1945 Ella Fitzgerald version reached number 4 on the Billboard chart.
- "Soothe Me" (1945) Words and music. First performed by Ernie Andrews
- "Don't Let the Sun Catch You Cryin'" (1946) Words and music. First performed by Ernie Andrews accompanied by the Wilbert Baranco Trio
- "Across the Alley from the Alamo" (1947) Words and music.
  - The Mills Brothers version reached number 2 on the Billboard chart.
- "Just Like Two Drops of Water" (1951) First performed by June Barton
- "All About Ronnie" (1953) Words and music. First performed by Stan Kenton and His Orchestra, vocals by Chris Connor
- "Annabelle" (1953) Words; music by Nelson Riddle
- "Come to the Party" (1955) Words and music
- "I'm Lost Without You Tonight" (1955) Performed by Dinah Washington
- "Oh My" (1956), Words and music; Performed by Sarah Vaughan
- "The Tender Touch" (1956) Words and music by Joe Greene and Nelson Riddle
- "Make Me a Present of You" (1958) Performed by Dinah Washington

== Film credits ==
Various films featured songs by Greene, including,

- 1944 Artistry in Rhythm (Short) (lyrics: I'm Going Mad for a Pad)
- 1946 Cowboy Blues (music: I Been Down in Texas)
- 1946 The Big Sleep (lyrics: And Her Tears Flowed Like Wine - uncredited)
- 1946 Two Guys from Milwaukee (lyrics: And Her Tears Flowed Like Wine - uncredited)
- 1947 Stan Kenton and His Orchestra (Short) (writer: I Been Down in Texas - uncredited)
- 1966 Psychedelic Sexualis (music)
- 1975 Black Lolita (lyrics: "Lolita") / (music: Lolita)
- 1996 Bogart: The Untold Story (TV Movie documentary) (lyrics: And Her Tears Flowed Like Wine (1944) - uncredited)
- 1999 Lansky (TV Movie) (writer: All About Ronnie)
- 2001 An American Rhapsody (writer: Don't Let the Sun Catch You Cryin' (1946))
- 2003 A Guy Thing (writer: Across The Alley From The Alamo)

== Sources ==
- Buttsy (2014-04-01). "Almost Remembering the Alamo".
- Chadbourne, Eugene (2015). "Joe Greene". All Music.
- Cryer, Max (2013-12-13). Common Phrases: And the Amazing Stories Behind Them. Skyhorse Publishing Company, Incorporated. ISBN 978-1-62873-154-5.
- Jet (1952-05-15). "Entertainment". Jet – the Weekly Negro News Magazine. Johnson Publishing Company. ISSN 0021-5996.
- "Joseph Greene, Composer With Stan Kenton's Orchestra, Dies". Los Angeles Times. 1986-06-28.
- "Songs written by Joe Greene". Music VF.
- Spencer, Kristopher (2008-01-01). Film and Television Scores, 1950-1979: A Critical Survey by Genre. McFarland. ISBN 978-0-7864-5228-6.
