= At Vine St. Live =

Live album by Anita O'Day
- Released: 1991
- Recorded: August 2–3, 1991
- Genre: Vocal jazz
- Length: 43:04
- Label: Kayo Stereophonics/DRG (reissue)

Anita O'Day chronology
In a Mellow Tone (1989)	At Vine St. Live (1991)	Live in Person (1993)

Professional ratings
Review scores
Source	Rating
Allmusic	1.5/5 stars

At Vine St. Live is a 1991 live album by Anita O'Day.

== Track listing ==
1. "You'd Be So Nice to Come Home To" (Cole Porter) – 5:41
2. "Old Devil Moon" (Yip Harburg, Burton Lane) – 4:23
3. "Is You Is or Is You Ain't My Baby" (Bill Austin, Louis Jordan) – 4:22
4. "A Song for You" (Leon Russell) – 3:05
5. "You Can Depend on Me" (Charles Carpenter, Louis Dunlap, Earl Hines) – 3:47
6. "Street of Dreams" (Sam M. Lewis, Victor Young) – 6:04
7. "You Turned the Tables on Me" (Louis Alter, Sidney D. Mitchell) – 4:09
8. "Yesterday"/"Yesterdays" (Lennon and McCartney)/(Otto Harbach, Jerome Kern) – 3:48
9. "S'posin'" (Paul Denniker, Andy Razaf) – 3:59
10. "It Don't Mean a Thing (If It Ain't Got That Swing)" (Duke Ellington, Irving Mills) – 3:52

== Personnel ==
- Anita O'Day – vocals
- Gordon Brisker - Tenor Sax & Flute
- Pete Jolly - Piano
- Bob Maize - Bass
- Steve Homan - Guitar
- Danny D'Imperio - Drums
- Recorded live at The Vine Street Bar & Grill, Hollywood CA., August 2 & 3, 1991.
