= Tea for Two (song) =

1924 Song by Vincent Youmans and Irving Caesar

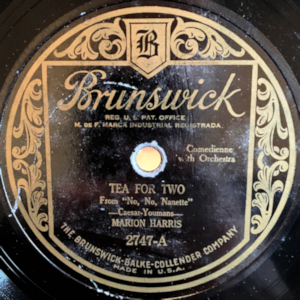
- Record label of 1925 number one hit by Marion Harris

Single by Marion Harris
- B-side: "The Blues Have Got Me"
- Written: 1924
- Published: June 10, 1924 Harms, Inc.
- Released: January 1925
- Recorded: October 15, 1924
- Studio: Brunswick Studios, 799 Seventh Avenue, New York City
- Genre: Popular music, musical theater
- Label: Brunswick 2747
- Composer: Vincent Youmans
- Lyricist: Irving Caesar

Audio sample
- Recording of Tea For Two, performed by Marion Harris (1924): file; help

"Tea for Two" is a 1924 song composed by Vincent Youmans, with lyrics by Irving Caesar. It was introduced in May 1924 by Phyllis Cleveland and John Barker during the Chicago pre-Broadway run of the musical No, No, Nanette. When the show finally hit Broadway on September 16, 1925, Nanette was played by Louise Groody, and her duet with Barker of "Tea for Two" was a hit. The song went on to become the biggest success of Youmans's career.

== Background ==
Youmans had written the basic melody idea of "Tea for Two" while he was in the navy during World War I, and he used it later on as an introductory passage for a song called "Who's Who with You?". While in Chicago, Youmans developed the idea into "a song that the hero could sing to the heroine" for the musical No, No, Nanette. Soon after, he played his composition for Irving Caesar and insisted he write the lyrics then and there. Caesar quickly jotted down a mock-up lyric, fully intending to revise it later on. Youmans, though, loved the mock-up and convinced Caesar it was just right for the melody.

It has been proposed, with little supporting evidence, that the phrase 'Tea for Two' was originally shouted by hawkers on the streets of 18th century England who wanted to attract business by lowering the price of a pot of tea from thruppence (three pence) to tuppence (two pence). While this may be the case, 'tea for two' would have been a commonplace order for a couple in 19th-century English cafeterias.

== Lyrics ==
The song is a duet between a man and a woman contemplating marriage and their idyllic life together, isolated from society. It has many internal rhymes.

== Musical characteristics ==
The melody is rhythmically repetitive and is described as simple yet charming. The song is originally in the key of A♭ major and starts with the verse, which is followed by the refrain.

The refrain has an A1-A2-A3-B form, a range of just over an octave, and major tonalities. The melody of the "A1", "A3", and "B" sections uses an alternating pattern of dotted quarter notes and eighth notes. The melody and harmony of the "A2" section is almost a copy of the "A1" section, but is transposed up a major third and uses a slightly embellished rhythm for the melody. The "A2" section ends by modulating back to the original key using an E♭ whole note over an E♭7, the dominant chord of the original key. The melody and harmony of the "A3" section is a copy of the "A1" section, but ends on a different pitch and transitions to the "B" section using a iiø–V7–i. The first half of the melody of the "B" section uses two falling phrase segments with the same rhythm as the "A1" melody. The second half of the "B" section is the same as the second half of the "A1" section, but its melody ends on the root of the tonic chord instead of on its third.

== Charting recordings ==
- January 1925: The Benson Orchestra of Chicago's instrumental rendition reaches number five on the US Billboard chart and stays there for five weeks.
- January 1925: Marion Harris's rendition reaches number one on the US Billboard chart and stays there for 11 weeks.
- 1939: Art Tatum's rendition, for which he posthumously received a Grammy Hall of Fame Award, hits number eighteen on the US Billboard chart and stays there for a week.
- September 1958: Tommy Dorsey's rendition reaches number seven on the US Billboard chart and stays there for twenty weeks and number five on the weekly top 50 charts from the Toronto radio station 'CHUM' and stays there for thirteen weeks.
- October 1958: Tommy Dorsey's rendition reaches number three on the UK Singles chart and stays there nineteen weeks.

== Adaptations and notable covers ==
- In 1926, Boris Fomin arranged it for inclusion in his operetta "The Career of Pierpont Blake" (Карьера Пирпойнта Блэка), with Russian lyrics by Konstantin Podrevsky, under the title "Tahiti Trot".
- In 1927, Dmitri Shostakovich arranged "Tea for Two", known in the Soviet Union as Tahiti Trot, from memory after conductor Nicolai Malko bet him he could not do it in under an hour. He completed the orchestration in 45 minutes.

The following artists covered the song: The Comedian Harmonists (1928), Benny Goodman (1937), Fats Waller (c. 1938–1939), Gene Krupa with Anita O'Day (c. 1942), Art Tatum, Stan Kenton with O'Day (1944–1945), Frank Sinatra and Dinah Shore (1947), Doris Day (1955), Duke Ellington, appearing on a 1999 expanded version of Ellington at Newport (1956), Bud Powell, appearing on The Genius of Bud Powell (1956), Teddy Wilson (1956), and Anita O'Day, appearing on Anita O'Day at Mister Kelly's (1959). Blossom Dearie recorded the song for her 1959 album Once Upon A Summertime.

== In popular culture ==
- In the 1975 documentary, Grey Gardens, Edith Ewing Bouvier Beale, or Big Edie, notoriously sings a slightly broken version of the song for the Maysles brothers, as it was one of her favorite songs during her youth.
- Bugs Bunny and Daffy Duck soft-shoe to “Tea for Two” in the Looney Tunes short Show Biz Bugs.
- The song features prominently in the novel La invención de Morel (1940) by Argentine writer Adolfo Bioy Casares.
- In the French–British WWII-set comedy film La Grande Vadrouille (1966) the humming of the "Tea for Two" melody is the secret code for the British bomber crew members to recognise each other in the hammam at the Grand Mosque of Paris.
- Occasionally on The Tonight Show Starring Johnny Carson, if a joke bombed during his monologue, the band would play "Tea for Two" and Carson would do a short soft shoe dance, which always got a laugh from the studio audience.
- The pianist Yuja Wang will play "Tea For Two" as an encore, after, for example, playing all four Rachmaninov piano concertos at a concert.
- The song is featured on The Offspring's 1997 album Ixnay on the Hombre, in the form of the track "Intermission."
- The song is referenced in the 1974 Grateful Dead song "Scarlet Begonias."
- James Thurber lampoons the song's lyrics in his 1956 fable, "Tea for One" in which the husband wants coffee, but his bride tells him it "doesn't rhyme with anything" and the husband eventually slips away to find "a meal a man could eat", with the moral, "If life went along like a popular song, every man's marriage would surely go wrong."
