= Tahiti Trot =

1927 arrangement by Dmitri Shostakovich

- Tea for Two
- Arrangement by Dmitri Shostakovich
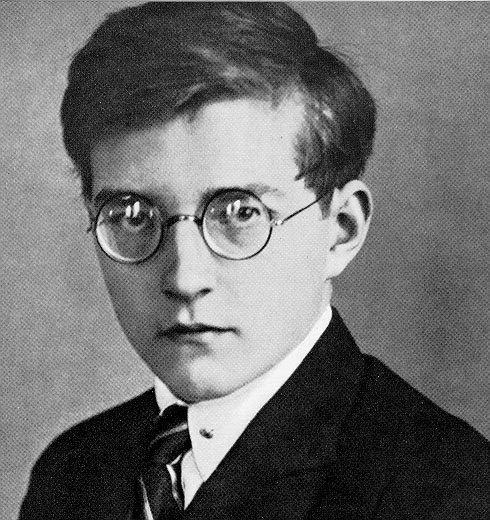
- Dmitri Shostakovich in 1925
- Opus: 16
- Commissioned by: Nicolai Malko
- Based on: "Tea for Two" by Vincent Youmans
- Composed: circa October 1927
- Dedication: To dear Nicolai Andreyevich Malko as a token of my best feelings
- Publisher: Muzika, Hans Sikorski Musikverlage
- Duration: 4 minutes
- Scoring: symphony orchestra

Premiere
- Date: November 25, 1928
- Location: Large Hall of the Moscow Conservatory, Moscow, Russian SFSR
- Conductor: Nicolai Malko
- Performers: SovFil Orchestra

Tahiti Trot (Russian: Таити трот, romanized: Taiti trot) (or Tea for Two), Op. 16, is an arrangement for symphony orchestra by Dmitri Shostakovich of the song "Tea for Two" from the musical No, No, Nanette by Vincent Youmans. It was composed in 1927 and resulted from a bet between the composer and the score's dedicatee, Nicolai Malko.

Tahiti Trot was premiered on November 25, 1928, and quickly became popular in the Soviet Union. Changing cultural politics that resulted from the Great Break and the end of NEP led to Shostakovich renouncing the work. It subsequently was withdrawn, then considered a lost work until Gennady Rozhdestvensky reconstructed it in the early 1980s from orchestral parts presented to him by Malko's widow; it was first published in 1984.

== History ==
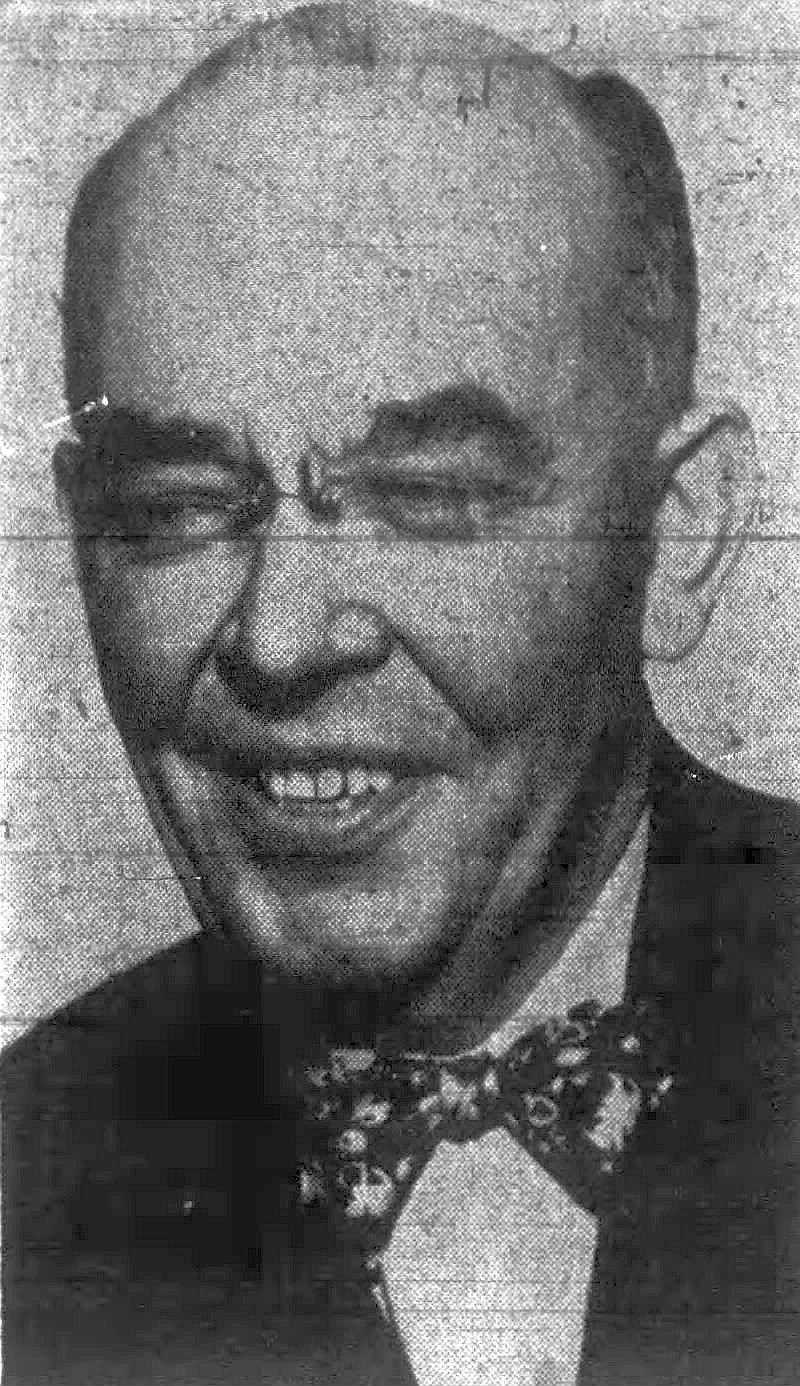
Nikolai Malko (pictured here in 1946) proposed an orchestral arrangement of "Tea for Two" as a bet to Shostakovich

In his memoirs, Nicolai Malko recalled first hearing Vincent Youmans' "Tea for Two" at the Meyerhold Theatre in Moscow in 1927:

[They] performed a play called Roar, China. In one of the scenes some Americans on a ship are dancing. The foxtrot used in that scene became very popular. Nobody knew who the composer was. [...] It was called the "Tahiti Trot". In reality it was "Tea for Two". Jazz music was regarded very negatively in Russia in those days. I did not agree with this philosophy and referred to that foxtrot as an example of music that was not bad.

Shostakovich developed an interest in popular music during this period. Like Malko, he had heard "Tea for Two" at the Meyerhold Theatre. He was also greatly impressed by Ernst Krenek's jazz-influenced opera, Jonny spielt auf, and its arrangement of another Youmans song from No, No, Nanette, "I Want to Be Happy". In the company of friends he enjoyed playing jazz-style improvisations on the piano for them.

At some point before October 1927, Malko jokingly suggested to Shostakovich that he should orchestrate "Tea for Two" and proposed a bet:

If you, Mitenka, are as brilliant as they all say, then please go into the next room, write that song down from memory, orchestrate it, and I will play it. I will give you an hour to do this.

Shostakovich completed his task in forty-five minutes, thereby winning the bet. He dedicated the score to Malko as a "token of [his] best feelings".

Tahiti Trot was later included, with modified orchestration, as the interlude to the third act of the ballet The Golden Age upon the request of Alexander Gauk. Shostakovich also included Tahiti Trot in an unpublished five-movement version of the ballet's suite.

== Music ==
The manuscript score has no tempo markings; these were added by Gennady Rozhdestvensky when he edited the score for its first publication in 1984. (Note: В автографе темпа отсутствует, метр—четыре четверти. Добавлено и изменено редактором.) A typical performance takes four minutes.

=== Instrumentation ===
In the original arrangement, the orchestra consists of the following instruments:

Woodwinds
2 flutes (2nd doubling piccolo)
2 oboes
1 clarinet
1 bassoon
Brass
4 French horns
2 trumpets
1 trombone

Percussion
timpani
triangle
tambourine
snare drum
cymbals
glockenspiel
xylophone
Keyboards
celesta

Strings
harp
1st violins
2nd violins
violas
cellos
double basses

Shostakovich later adjusted the orchestration for the version of Tahiti Trot in The Golden Age and added a woodblock and alto saxophone.

== Premieres ==
Tahiti Trot was officially premiered at the Large Hall of the Moscow Conservatory on November 25, 1928, by the SovFil Orchestra conducted by Malko, although this had been preceded by his performances on August 2 and 3 with the Baku Academic Orchestra in the Azerbaijani SSR. It appeared in a program devoted to Shostakovich's music, which also included the suite from The Nose and another arrangement, Two Pieces by Domenico Scarlatti, Op. 17. Malko toured Tahiti Trot around the Soviet Union, including in Kiev where the score was pirated and performed without permission. According to Gauk, Tahiti Trot elicited the vivid approval of audiences, which always demanded the piece be encored.

The first British performance took place in London on March 8, 1929, (Note: Derek C. Hulme incorrectly states that the British premiere did not occur until August 14, 1981, at the 87th Proms.) with Malko conducting the Wireless Orchestra. Prior to that performance, Malko told the Daily Mail that he did not make distinctions between a "great symphony" or a "musical comedy" provided that they are good, and that he appreciated a "good jazz band as much as a good symphony orchestra and far prefer[ed] to listen to a really good jazz band than a poor symphony orchestra".

== Retraction and loss ==
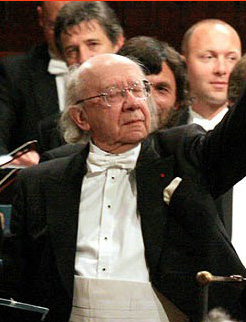
Gennady Rozhdestvensky reconstructed Tahiti Trot from the original orchestral parts that Malko bequeathed to his widow

The popularity of foxtrots and light music in the Soviet Union was viewed as a "problem" by the authorities. At a June 1929 conference of the Central Committee of the CPSU, People's Commissar of Education Anatol Lunacharsky said that no task was "more urgent" for Soviet culture than to rebuke the "aggressive, jazzy syncopations of the foxtrot":

The bourgeoisie would like man to live not so much by his head as by his sexual organs. [...] The fundamental element of the foxtrot derives from mechanization, suppressed eroticism, and a desire to deaden feeling through drugs. [...] [W]e do not need that kind of music.

Shostakovich repudiated Tahiti Trot in a 1930 issue of Proletarskiy Muzikant, the house journal of the Russian Association of Proletarian Musicians. He said that composing the arrangement and letting Malko perform it had been a "political mistake", that he had conceived it for The Golden Age and that playing outside the context of the ballet gave the incorrect impression that he was a supporter of light music, and that he dispatched a letter to Malko immediately demanding that he cease performing Tahiti Trot. A later issue of Proletarskiy Muzikant published Malko's response, which said that he never received any demand to stop performing Tahiti Trot, but that he had not programmed it in any of his recent concerts anyway. He also expressed irritation that Shostakovich had seemingly put the entire blame for the affair on him. In an afterword, the editorial board of the magazine wrote that both composer and conductor shared equal responsibility.

The score was withdrawn and quickly forgotten, an outcome that Gauk deplored in his memoirs. By 1942, the manuscript was reported lost by Nicolas Slonimsky, although Malko confirmed in his memoirs that he still possessed it.

== Reconstruction ==
Gennady Rozhdestvensky reconstructed Tahiti Trot using the original orchestral parts that had been in the possession of Malko. His widow provided them to Rozhdestvensky. Tahiti Trot was published for the first time in 1984.

== Sources ==
- Fay, Laurel (2000). Shostakovich: A Life. Oxford University Press. ISBN 0-19-513438-9.
- Gauk, Alexander (1975). "Творческие встречи: Д. Д. Шостакович". А. В. Гаук. Мемуары. Избранные статьи. Воспоминания современников (in Russian). Moscow: Советский композитор.
- Khentova, Sofia (1985). Шостакович. Жизнь и творчество, Т. 1 (in Russian). Moscow: Советский композитор.
- Malko, Nicolai (1966). A Certain Art. Translated by Malko, George. New York City: William Morrow and Company.
- Shostakovich, Dmitri (1984). Rozhdestvensky, Gennady (ed.). Collected Works in Forty-Two Volumes, Volume 10. Moscow: Muzika.
- Volkov, Solomon (April 1978). "Dmitri Shostakovich and 'Tea for Two'". The Musical Quarterly. 64 (2): 223–228. doi:10.1093/mq/LXIV.2.223. JSTOR 741446.
