= Indestructible! =

Studio album by Anita O'Day
- Released: April 18, 2006
- Recorded: February 2004 – November 2005
- Genre: Vocal jazz
- Length: 36:31
- Label: Kayo Stereophonics
- Producer: Robbie Cavolina, Anita O'Day

Anita O'Day chronology
Rules of the Road (1993)	Indestructible! (2006)

Professional ratings
Review scores
Source	Rating
AllMusic	2/5 stars

Indestructible! is a 2006 studio album by the American jazz singer Anita O'Day. It was O'Day's final recording.

Indestructible! was O'Day's first album in thirteen years on her record label, Kayo Stereophonics, and was recorded between February 2004 and November 2005 at the Maid's Room, New York City. Musical arrangements and piano were by John Colianni.

O'Day died seven months after the album was released.

== Track listing ==
1. "Blue Skies" (Irving Berlin) – 2:58
2. "This Can't Be Love" (Richard Rodgers, Lorenz Hart) – 3:16
3. "Is You Is or Is You Ain't My Baby" (Bill Austin, Louis Jordan) – 4:01
4. "All of Me" (Gerald Marks, Seymour Simons) – 3:10
5. "A Slip of the Lip" (Mercer Ellington, Luther Henderson) – 2:39
6. "Pennies from Heaven" (Johnny Burke, Arthur Johnston) – 2:33
7. "Gimme a Pigfoot (And a Bottle of Beer)" (Coot Grant, Wesley Wilson) – 3:30
8. "Them There Eyes" (Maceo Pinkard, Doris Tauber, William Tracey) – 3:10
9. "Between the Devil and the Deep Blue Sea" (Berlin) – 2:54
10. "My Little Suede Shoes" (Charlie Parker) – 3:30
11. "The Nearness of You" (Hoagy Carmichael, Ned Washington) – 5:25
