= Anita O'Day Sings the Winners =

Anita Sings the Winners

Studio album by Anita O'Day
- Released: 1958
- Recorded: 1958
- Genre: Vocal jazz
- Label: Verve
- Producer: Norman Granz, Anita O'Day

Anita O'Day chronology
Anita Sings the Most (1957)	Anita Sings the Winners (1958)	Anita O'Day at Mister Kelly's (1958)

Professional ratings
Review scores
Source	Rating
Down Beat	4/5 stars
The Rolling Stone Jazz Record Guide	3/5 stars

Anita O'Day Sings the Winners is a 1958 album by Anita O'Day.

The concept of this album was to pick the "winners" from the top Jazz and Orchestral Charts.

== Track listing ==
1. "Take the "A" Train" (Billy Strayhorn, Duke Ellington) - 2:48
2. "Tenderly" (Walter Gross, Jack Lawrence) - 2:38
3. "A Night in Tunisia" (Dizzy Gillespie) - 2:35
4. "Four" (Miles Davis) - 2:48
5. "Early Autumn" (Ralph Burns, Woody Herman, Johnny Mercer) - 3:08
6. "Four Brothers" (Jimmy Giuffre) - 2:23
7. "Sing, Sing, Sing" (Louis Prima) - 3:29
8. "My Funny Valentine" (Richard Rodgers, Lorenz Hart) - 3:34
9. "Frenesi" (Alberto Dominguez, Leonard Whitcup) - 3:01
10. "Body and Soul" (Edward Heyman, Robert Sour, Frank Eyton, Johnny Green) - 3:20
11. "What's Your Story Morning Glory?" (Jack Lawrence, Paul Francis Webster, Mary Lou Williams) - 3:47
12. "Peanut Vendor" (L. Wolfe Gilbert, Moisés Simóns, Marion Sunshine) - 2:38

== Personnel ==
- Anita O'Day - vocals
- Marty Paich - arranger and conductor, tracks 1 - 6
- Russell Garcia - arranger and conductor, tracks 7 - 12
