= Yesterdays (1933 song) =

Song by Jerome Kern
- Published: 1933 by Harms
- Songwriter: Otto Harbach
- Composer: Jerome Kern

"Yesterdays" is a 1933 song about nostalgia composed by Jerome Kern with lyrics by Otto Harbach. They wrote the song for Roberta, a musical based on the novel Gowns by Roberta by Alice Duer Miller. "Yesterdays" was overshadowed by the musical production's more popular song, "Smoke Gets in Your Eyes", which was a number one hit for the Paul Whiteman orchestra.

== Other recordings ==
- Artie Shaw and his Orchestra (1938) (RCA-Victor mx. BS-027231, take 1; Rel. Bluebird B-10001-B)
- Billie Holiday (1939) and 1952 recording
- Coleman Hawkins (1944)
- Jo Stafford with Paul Weston – Songs by Jo Stafford (1946)
- Lee Konitz with Miles Davis – Conception (1949)
- Art Tatum – Piano Starts Here (1949)
- Lennie Tristano – Crosscurrents (1949)
- Bud Powell – Jazz Giant (1950)
- Miles Davis (1951) (1965)
- Stan Getz – Stan Getz at Storyville Vol. 2 (1951)
- Johnny Smith feat. Stan Getz – Moonlight in Vermont (1952)
- Jackie Gleason Orchestra – Music, Martinis and Memories (1954)
- Ink Spots (1954)
- Helen Merrill – Helen Merrill (1954)
- Artie Shaw - Artie Shaw and his Gramercy Five (Album 3) (including Tal Farlow, Hank Jones, Tommy Potter) (1954) Reissue: The Last Recordings: Rare and Unreleased, Vol. 1 (1992)
- Clifford Brown – Clifford Brown with Strings (1955)
- Stan Kenton – Contemporary Concepts (1955)
- Tal Farlow – Tal (1956)
- Vince Guaraldi Trio – A Flower Is a Lovesome Thing (1957)
- Charles Mingus with Hampton Hawes – Mingus Three (1957)
- Modern Jazz Quartet – Modern Jazz Quartet (1975)
- Tito Puente – Puente Goes Jazz (1957)
- Four Freshmen – Voices in Latin (1958)
- Marion Marlowe – Dearly Beloved (1959)
- Buddy Rich and Max Roach – Rich Versus Roach (1959)
- Anita O'Day – Waiter, Make Mine Blues (1960)
- Oscar Peterson (1961)
- Frank Sinatra - Sinatra and Strings (1962)
- Ella Fitzgerald – Ella Fitzgerald Sings the Jerome Kern Song Book (1963)
- Sonny Rollins and Coleman Hawkins – Sonny Meets Hawk! (1963)
- Booker Ervin – The Song Book (1964)
- Barbra Streisand – Color Me Barbra (1966)
- Erroll Garner – Magician (1973)
- Stephane Grappelli and Yehudi Menuhin – Tea for Two (1977)
- Adam Makowicz and George Mraz – Classic Jazz Duets (1982)
- Kevin Eubanks – Guitarist (1983)
- Marianne Faithfull – Strange Weather (1987)
- Gato Barbieri – The Third World Revisited (1988)
- Larry Coryell – Shining Hour (1989)
- Tom Harrell with Kenny Werner – Sail Away (1991)
- Nnenna Freelon – Nnenna Freelon (1992)
- Stevie Holland – More Than Words Can Say (2006)
- Gordon Goodwin's Big Phat Band – Act Your Age (2008)
- Dorothy Donegan
- Paul Smith

== See also ==
- List of 1930s jazz standards
