= In a Mellow Tone (album) =

Studio album by Anita O'Day
- Released: 1989
- Recorded: 1989
- Genre: Vocal jazz
- Length: 50:57
- Label: Kayo Stereophonics, DRG (reissue)
- Producer: Hugh Fordin

Anita O'Day chronology
A Song for You (1984)	In a Mellow Tone (1989)	At Vine St. Live (1991)

Professional ratings
Review scores
Source	Rating
AllMusic	4/5 stars

In a Mellow Tone is a 1989 studio album by Anita O'Day.

== Track listing ==
1. "In a Mellow Tone" (Duke Ellington, Milt Gabler) – 4:20
2. "On the Trail" (Harold Adamson, Ferde Grofé) – 3:43
3. "The Man with a Horn" (Eddie DeLange, Jack Jenney, Bonnie Lake) – 3:24
4. "Once in a While" (Michael Edwards, Bud Green) – 3:48
5. "A Sleepin' Bee" (Harold Arlen, Truman Capote) – 5:04
6. "I Cried for You" (Gus Arnheim, Arthur Freed, Abe Lyman) – 5:48
7. "No Moon at All" (Redd Evans, Dave Mann) – 2:52
8. "Anita's Blues" (Anita O'Day) – 3:45
9. "Gee, Baby, Ain't I Good to You" (Andy Razaf, Don Redman) – 4:00
10. "Like Someone in Love" (Johnny Burke, Jimmy Van Heusen) – 3:48
11. "More Than You Know" (Edward Eliscu, Billy Rose, Vincent Youmans) – 5:30
12. "Lover, Come Back to Me" (Oscar Hammerstein II, Sigmund Romberg) – 4:55

== Personnel ==
- Anita O'Day - vocals
- Pete Jolly - piano
- Corky Hale - harp
- Brian Bromberg - double bass
- Frank Capp - drums
- David Black - percussion
- Gordon Brisker - synthesizer, flute, arranger, conductor, saxophone
