= Anita Sings the Most =

Studio album by Anita O'Day with the Oscar Peterson Quartet
- Released: April 1958
- Recorded: January 1957
- Genre: Vocal jazz
- Label: Verve
- Producer: Norman Granz

Anita O'Day chronology
Pick Yourself Up with Anita O'Day (1956)	Anita Sings the Most (1958)	Anita Sings the Winners (1958)

Anita Sings the Most is a studio album by American singer Anita O'Day with Oscar Peterson's quartet. It was released by Verve Records in April 1958 and was her fourth studio album in her career. Unlike her previous orchestra projects, Anita Sings the Most featured a simpler backing group containing 11 tracks with many up-tempo arrangements. The album received positive reviews following its release from publications like Cash Box, DownBeat and AllMusic.

== Background, recording and content ==
Anita O'Day began as a big band singer in the 1940s with Gene Krupa and Stan Kenton before graduating to a solo career in the 1950s. During the decade, she recorded for Norman Granz's Clef and Norgran labels before being one of the first artists signed to his newly-established Verve company. Granz's label released two studio albums of O'Day's material that featured her alongside orchestras: Anita (1956) and Pick Yourself Up with Anita O'Day (1957). Anita Sings the Most (her third Verve album) was with a small group backed by Oscar Peterson's quartet. The project was recorded in January 1957 in Chicago with Granz credited as the album's sole producer. The album contained a total of 11 tracks featuring Peterson's quartet along with O'Day's long-time collaborator and drummer, John Poole. Many of the songs were recorded in fast uptempo arrangements, with the exception of some tracks like "Bewitched, Bothered and Bewildered" and "We'll Be Together Again".

== Critical reception ==
Professional ratings
Review scores
Source	Rating
AllMusic	5/5 stars
DownBeat	5/5 stars

Anita Sings the Most received a positive reception from critics after its release. DownBeat magazine rated it five out of five stars and found O'Day's vocals to be "first rate" despite "skimpy liner notes and a poor cover". Cash Box magazine found it to be "her best [album] to date", believing the album would result in high sales figures. Jazz: The Rough Guide identified the album as one that shows O'Day's "rhythmic invention and accuracy". AllMusic's Scott Yanow also gave it a five-star rating and concluded, "The very brief playing time (just 33 minutes) is unfortunate on this set, but the high quality definitely makes up for the lack of quantity. A gem."

== Release and aftermath ==
Anita Sings the Most was released in April 1958 by Verve Records and was her fourth studio album. It was originally distributed as a vinyl LP, featuring five songs on Side A and six songs on Side B. It was then reissued onto a compact disc (CD) in 1986 in both Europe and Japan. In the years that followed, it became available to digital platforms including Apple Music. Reflecting on the album years later, The Independent recalled O'Day saying, "Songs to me are like horse races. We're off and running and if it lays real good in the back stretch you try to win. The only one I really lost was with Oscar Peterson. I lost 12 tunes consecutively." Meanwhile biographer Will Friedwald stated that O'Day found that it was "among her favorite albums".

== Track listing ==
Details taken from the original 1958 liner notes may differ from other sources. Song length was not included in the original liner notes, therefore song lengths are taken from the digital version from Apple Music.

Side one
No.	Title	Writer(s)	Length
1.	"'S Wonderful"/"They Can't Take That Away from Me"	George Gershwin; Ira Gershwin	2:58
2.	"Tenderly"	Walter Gross; Jack Lawrence	3:22
3.	"Old Devil Moon"	Yip Harburg; Burton Lane	2:54
4.	"Love Me or Leave Me"	Walter Donaldson; Gus Kahn	2:34
5.	"We'll Be Together Again"	Carl T. Fischer; Frankie Laine	3:41

Side two
No.	Title	Writer(s)	Length
1.	"Stella by Starlight"	Ned Washington; Victor Young	2:07
2.	"Taking a Chance on Love"	Vernon Duke; Ted Fetter; John Latouche	2:23
3.	"Them There Eyes"	Maceo Pinkard; Doris Tauber; William Tracey	2:39
4.	"I've Got the World on a String"	Harold Arlen; Ted Koehler	4:00
5.	"You Turned the Tables on Me"	Louis Alter; Sidney Mitchell	3:42
6.	"Bewitched, Bothered and Bewildered"	Lorenz Hart; Richard Rodgers	3:59

== Personnel ==
All credits are adapted from the 2024 LP reissue of Anita Sings the Most.

Musical and technical personnel

- Anita O'Day – vocals
- Oscar Peterson – piano
- Herb Ellis – guitar
- Ray Brown – double bass
- John Poole – drums
- Milt Holland – drums

== Release history ==
Release history and formats for Anita Sings the Most
Region	Date	Format	Label	Ref.
Various	April 1958	Verve Records; Columbia Records	LP mono	
Japan	1974–1985	Verve Records	LP mono	
Various	1986	Verve Records	Compact disc	
Japan	1990–2018	Verve Records	Compact disc	
Japan	1991–2013	Verve Records	LP	
Various	circa 2020	Verve Records	Music download; streaming	
Europe	2024	Supper Club	LP	
