= Trav'lin' Light (Anita O'Day album) =

Studio album by Anita O'Day
- Released: 1961
- Recorded: January 18, 19, 1961
- Genre: Vocal jazz
- Length: 35:36
- Label: Verve
- Producer: Russell Garcia

Anita O'Day chronology
| Waiter, Make Mine Blues (1961) | Trav'lin' Light (1961) | All the Sad Young Men (1961) |

Professional ratings
Review scores
| Source | Rating |
|---|---|
| Down Beat | 4.5/5 stars |
| Allmusic | 4/5 stars |

Trav'lin' Light is an album by Anita O'Day released on Norman Granz's Verve record label in 1961. It was a tribute to her idol Billie Holiday. It was recorded January 18 and 19, 1961, in Los Angeles, California. The music was arranged by Johnny Mandel and Russ Garcia and features Ben Webster and Mel Lewis among the personnel.

== Track listing ==
1. "Trav'lin' Light" (Johnny Mercer, Jimmy Mundy, Trummy Young) - 3:36
2. "The Moon Looks Down and Laughs" (Bert Kalmar, Harry Ruby, Sid Silvers) - 3:58
3. "Don't Explain" (Billie Holiday, Arthur Herzog Jr.) - 3:12
4. "Remember" (Irving Berlin) - 2:40
5. "Some Other Spring" (Herzog, Irene Kitchings) - 2:28
6. "What a Little Moonlight Can Do" (Harry M. Woods) - 2:30
7. "Miss Brown to You" (Leo Robin, Richard A. Whiting, Ralph Rainger) - 4:03
8. "God Bless the Child" (Herzog, Holiday) - 2:10
9. "If the Moon Turns Green" (Paul Cates, Bernie Hanighen) - 2:56
10. "I Hear Music" (Burton Lane, Frank Loesser) - 2:16
11. "Lover, Come Back to Me" (Oscar Hammerstein II, Sigmund Romberg) - 2:52
12. "Crazy He Calls Me" (Carl Sigman, Bob Russell) - 3:25
