= Cool Heat =

Studio album by Anita O'Day
- Released: 1959
- Recorded: April 6–8, 1959
- Studio: Radio Recorders, Los Angeles, CA
- Genre: Jazz
- Length: 31:45
- Label: Verve; MGV 8312

Anita O'Day chronology
Anita O'Day at Mister Kelly's (1958)	Cool Heat (1959)	Anita O'Day Swings Cole Porter with Billy May (1959)

Cool Heat, subtitled Anita O'Day Sings Jimmy Giuffre Arrangements, is an album by vocalist Anita O'Day backed by an orchestra arranged and conducted by Jimmy Giuffre which was released on the Verve label in 1959.

== Critical reception ==
Professional ratings
Review scores
Source	Rating
AllMusic	4.5/5 stars

Ken Dryden of AllMusic states: "All of O'Day's recordings for Verve in the 1950s are recommended, and this set is no exception".

== Track listing ==
1. "Mack the Knife" (Kurt Weill, Bertolt Brecht) – 3:05
2. "Easy Come, Easy Go" (Johnny Green, Edward Heyman) – 3:10
3. "Orphan Annie" (Public Domain) – 2:00
4. "You're a Clown" (Joe Albany, Aileen Albany) – 2:30
5. "Gone with the Wind" (Allie Wrubel, Herb Magidson) – 2:24
6. "Hooray for Hollywood" (Richard A. Whiting, Johnny Mercer) – 2:21
7. "It Had to Be You" (Isham Jones, Gus Kahn) – 3:10
8. "Come Rain or Come Shine" (Harold Arlen, Mercer) – 2:13
9. "Hershey Bar" (Johnny Mandel) – 2:05
10. "A Lover Is Blue" (Charles Carpenter, Jimmy Mundy, Trummy Young) – 2:59
11. "My Heart Belongs to Daddy" (Cole Porter) – 2:51
12. "The Way You Look Tonight" (Jerome Kern, Dorothy Fields) – 2:09

== Personnel ==
- Orchestra arranged and conducted by Jimmy Giuffre including:
- Conte Candoli, Tommy Reeves, Jack Sheldon – trumpet
- Gil Falco, Lester Robinson, Frank Rosolino – trombone
- Bud Shank – alto saxophone, flute
- Art Pepper – alto saxophone
- Richie Kamuca – tenor saxophone
- Jim Hall – guitar
- George Morrow – bass
- Mel Lewis – drums
