= Anita O'Day Collates =

Compilation album by Anita O'Day
- Released: September 1953
- Recorded: January–December 1952
- Genre: Jazz
- Label: Clef
- Producer: Norman Granz

Anita O'Day chronology
| Anita O'Day Collates (1953) | Songs by Anita O'Day (1954) |

Anita O'Day Collates is a compilation album by American singer, Anita O'Day. It was released in September 1953 by Clef Records and was the debut album of her career. The album originally contained eight tracks, but was re-released with an expanded version in 1954 that featured 12 tracks. It received mixed critical response following its original release.

== Background, recording and content ==
Anita O'Day had recently separated herself from performing as a big band singer to being a solo artist. She began recording for Norman Granz's Clef label, making $200 from her first session, according to her autobiography. She would later sign with his next label, Verve Records, in 1955. Anita O'Day Collates was the first album she made for Granz. The project was recorded in three sessions held throughout 1952. The first session (held in January) was recorded in New York City, while the second and third sessions were held in July and December respectively (held in Chicago). Despite a producer not credited on the original album, session information was later included in O'Day's 1999 box set, crediting Norman Granz as the sole producer. Anita O'Day Collates originally consisted of eight tracks. Its opening track was an original tune composed by O'Day titled "Rock 'n Roll Blues". Also included was a cover of Cole Porter's "Love for Sale" and Rodgers and Hart's "The Lady Is a Tramp". The 1955 reissued version featured the tracks "Pagan Love Song", "Ain't This a Wonderful Day", "Somebody's Crying" and "Vaya con Dios".

== Releases and critical reception ==
Anita O'Day Collates was originally released by Clef Records in September 1953 as a 10-inch vinyl LP featuring four songs on each side of the record. In 1955, it was reissued under the title Anita O'Day Sings Jazz, featuring a total of 12 tracks and offered with six sides on each side of the record. The album was called a "collate" in reference to the re-released material on the album. In its original release, Anita O'Day Collates received a mixed critical response. DownBeat only rated the project two out of five stars, writing, "Best thing about this is Norman Granz's superbly elliptical liner notes. Speak and Strawberry (a waltz) are new to us; rest were reviewed as singles. We have nothing to add." In reviewing a compilation containing the songs from the original project, Jazz Journal favorably wrote, "Excellent songs, high standards, and always in the spotlight one of the finest jazz singers of all time captured in her prime."

== Track listing ==
=== Side One ===
1. "Rock 'n' Roll Blues" (Anita O'Day) — 3:17
2. "Love for Sale" (Cole Porter) — 3:34
3. "Lover, Come Back to Me" (Sigmund Romberg, Oscar Hammerstein II) — 2:27
4. "Lullaby of the Leaves" (Bernice Petkere) — 3:08

=== Side Two ===
1. "The No Soap, No Hope, No Mouse, No House Blues" (Jerry Ross) — 2:32
2. "The Lady Is a Tramp" (Richard Rodgers, Lorenz Hart) — 2:39
3. "Speak Low" (Kurt Weill, Ogden Nash) — 2:34
4. "Strawberry Moon" (Sammy Mysels, Bob Hilliard) — 3:08

=== Additional tracks on the 1957 version ===
1. "Pagan Love Song" (Arthur Freed, Nacio Herb Brown)
2. "Ain't This a Wonderful Day"
3. "Somebody's Crying"
4. "Vaya con Dios" (Larry Russell, Inez James, Buddy Pepper)

== Personnel ==
All credits are adapted from the liner notes of the 1999 box set, The Complete Anita O'Day Verve/Clef Sessions.

- Anita O'Day – vocals
- Norman Granz – producer
- Roy Eldridge – trumpet
- Bill Harris – trombone
- Budd Johnson – tenor sax
- Cecil Payne – baritone sax
- Ralph Burns – piano, arranger
- Al McKibbon – bass
- Don Lamond – drums
- Roy Kral – piano, arranger
- Earl Backus – guitar
- Johnny Frigo – bass
- Robert "Red" Lionberg – drums
- Jimmy Wilson – bongos

== Release history ==
Release history and formats for Anita O'Day Collates and Anita O'Day Sings Jazz
| Region | Date | Format | Label | Ref. |
|---|---|---|---|---|
| Various | September 1953 | LP 10-inch mono | Clef Records | |
| Various | 1955 | LP mono | Norgran Records | |
| Various | 1956 | LP 10-inch mono | Columbia Records | |
| Japan | November 26, 2003 | Compact disc | Clef Records | |
| Japan | March 7, 2007 | Compact disc | Verve Records | |
