= Pick Yourself Up with Anita O'Day =

Studio album by Anita O'Day
- Released: February 1957
- Recorded: January 4 – December 20, 1956
- Studio: Capitol Studios
- Genre: Jazz; pop
- Label: Verve
- Producer: Norman Granz

Anita O'Day chronology
Anita (1956)	Pick Yourself Up with Anita O'Day (1957)	Anita Sings the Most (1957)

Pick Yourself Up with Anita O'Day is a studio album by American singer, Anita O'Day. It was released in February 1957 by Verve Records with arrangements by Buddy Bregman. The original release of the project featured 12 tracks performed in jazz and pop styles. Included in the track listing was one of O'Day's signature pieces: "Sweet Georgia Brown". It received mixed reception from critics, with some praising O'Day's vocal performance while others disliked the hoarseness of her delivery.

== Background and recording ==
Anita O'Day started her career as a big band singer in the 1940s alongside Gene Krupa and Stan Kenton before going into a solo career in the 1950s. She was one of the first artists to sign with Norman Granz's Verve record label in the middle of the decade and would record a series of critically-acclaimed discs for the company into the 1960s. Her second Verve album was Pick Yourself Up with Anita O'Day. The album was recorded in sessions held between January 4 and December 20, 1956, at Capitol Studios located in Los Angeles, California. It featured orchestra conducted by Buddy Bregman and production from Granz. It was her second Verve project featuring Bregman and his orchestra. In her autobiography, O'Day states that she was pleased with the album because she believed the studio musicians were of the highest quality.

== Content ==
The 12 tunes featured on Pick Yourself Up followed a similar formula of featuring American standards fused jazz with pop. Among its tracks was "Sweet Georgia Brown", a tune that would become a signature piece in O'Day's concerts throughout her career. The style of the track was different compared to other versions of the song because O'Day and Bregman created their own arrangement of it. Other tracks like "Stompin' at the Savoy" featured O'Day performing a scat solo while "Don't Be That Way" features a vibraphone instrumentation solo. A reissue of the album featured nine additional tracks, including "The Rock & Roll Waltz", "I'm with You" and We Laughed at Love". These songs were not previously included on an album offering by Verve despite being recorded around the same time frame.

== Release and critical reception ==
Professional ratings
Review scores
Source	Rating
The Penguin Guide to Jazz Recordings	3.5/4 stars
AllMusic	4.5/5 stars
DownBeat	5/5 stars

Pick Yourself Up with Anita O'Day was originally released in February 1957 by Verve Records and was among 28 albums issued by the company that month. It was originally distributed as a vinyl LP while a reissue of the album was released on November 17, 1992, and was distributed as a compact disc. The project was given mixed reception from critics upon its release. DownBeat gave it a five-star rating, noticing a hoarseness in O'Day's voice while also finding it to be "head and shoulders above any vocal album" the reviewer had recently reviewed. Meanwhile Billboard found it to be "something of a disappointment" when compared to her last Verve LP, writing, "a feeling of uncertainty in the vocal department persists." Cash Box appreciated O'Day's vocal stylings, commenting, "Miss O'Day’s husky styling feels intimately at home on standards fitting neatly into the swinging atmosphere." AllMusic's Scott Yanow gave the CD reissue 4.5 out of five stars and concluded, "Virtually all of Anita O'Day's 1950s recordings are recommended, for her drug use had not yet affected her voice and her creativity was generally at its height."

== Track listing ==
Details taken from the original 1957 liner notes may differ from other sources. Song length was not included in the original liner notes, therefore song lengths are taken from the 1992 compact disc reissue.

Side one
No.	Title	Writer(s)	Length
1.	"Don't Be That Way"	Benny Goodman; Edgar Sampson; Mitchell Parish	2:32
2.	"Let's Face the Music and Dance"	Irving Berlin	3:16
3.	"I Never Had a Chance"	Berlin	4:22
4.	"Stompin' at the Savoy"	Goodman; Chick Webb; Andy Razaf; Sampson	3:18
5.	"Pick Yourself Up"	Jerome Kern; Dorothy Fields	3:05
6.	"Stars Fell on Alabama"	Frank Perkins; Parish	2:51

Side two
No.	Title	Writer(s)	Length
7.	"Sweet Georgia Brown"	Ben Bernie; Maceo Pinkard; Kenneth Casey	4:13
8.	"I Won't Dance"	Kern; Jimmy McHugh; Oscar Hammerstein II; Otto Harbach; Fields	3:25
9.	"Man with a Horn"	Eddie DeLange; Bonnie Lake; Jack Jenney	3:55
10.	"I Used to Be Color Blind"	Berlin	3:09
11.	"There's a Lull in My Life"	Mack Gordon; Harry Revel	3:18
12.	"Let's Begin"	Harbach; Kern	2:21

CD Reissue Bonus Tracks
No.	Title	Writer(s)	Length
13.	"I'm with You"	Johnny Mercer; Bobby Troup	2:04
14.	"The Rock & Roll Waltz"	Shorty Allen; Roy Alfred	2:44
15.	"The Getaway and the Chase"	Biff Jones; Charles Meyer	2:25
16.	"Your Picture's Hanging Crooked on the Wall"	George R. Brown; William Lava	2:29
17.	"We Laughed at Love"	Bourne; Gus Kahn; Messenheimer	3:09
18.	"I'm Not Lonely"	Keith; Spence	3:03
19.	"Let's Face the Music and Dance"	Berlin	3:17
20.	"Ivy"	Hoagy Carmichael	2:45
21.	"Stars Fell on Alabama"	Parish; Perkins	2:48

== Personnel ==
All credits are adapted from the CD liner notes of Pick Yourself up with Anita O'Day

Musical and technical personnel

- Anita O'Day – vocals
- Norman Granz – producer
- Herman Leonard – photography
- Buddy Bregman – arrangements
- Conte Candoli – trumpet
- Pete Candoli – trumpet
- Harry Edison – trumpet
- Ray Linn – trumpet
- Conrad Gozzo – trumpet
- Lloyd Ulyate – trombone
- Milt Bernhart – trombone
- Frank Rosolino – trombone
- George Roberts – trombone, bass trombone
- Herb Geller – alto saxophone
- Bud Shank – alto saxophone, tenor saxophone
- Georgie Auld – tenor saxophone
- Bob Cooper – tenor saxophone
- Jimmy Giuffre – baritone saxophone
- Paul Smith – piano
- Larry Bunker – vibraphone
- Al Hendrickson – guitar
- Barney Kessel – guitar
- Joe Mondragon – bass
- Alvin Stoller – drums

== Release history ==
Release history and formats for Pick Yourself Up with Anita O'Day
Region	Date	Format	Label	Ref.
Various	February 1957	LP mono	Verve Records	
Various	1958	10-inch LP	His Master's Voice	
Japan	1960–1988	LP mono	Verve Records	
Denmark	1988	LP mono	Official Records	
Japan	1988	Compact disc	Verve Records	
Various	1990–1992	Compact disc	Verve Records	
Spain	2004	Compact disc	Universal Music Spain	
Japan	2007–2023	Compact disc	Verve Records	
Various	Circa 2020	Music download; streaming	Verve Records	
