= Waiter, Make Mine Blues =

Studio album by Anita O'Day
- Released: 1961
- Recorded: August 1, October 4, 7, Los Angeles
- Genre: Vocal jazz
- Length: 37:30
- Label: Verve

Anita O'Day chronology
Anita O'Day and Billy May Swing Rodgers and Hart (1960)	Waiter, Make Mine Blues (1961)	Trav'lin' Light (1961)

Waiter, Make Mine Blues is a vocal jazz album by Anita O'Day released in April 1961 on Verve Records. This was the tenth record that Anita O'Day made for Norman Granz's Verve records. It was recorded in 1960 on August 1, October 4 and October 7 in Los Angeles, California. Arranged by Russ Garcia, the record has been described as "forties swing based", with a contrasting "boppish alto solo" by saxophonist Bud Shank on "Whatever Happened to You?"

== Reception ==
Professional ratings
Review scores
Source	Rating
Allmusic	4/5 stars

The Allmusic review by Jason Ankeny awarded the album four stars and said that "West Coast greats including Barney Kessel and Bud Shank are...on hand to lend the session an even lighter, sweeter tone that couches the melancholy the album's title portends songs like "The Thrill Is Gone" and "When Sunny Gets Blue" capture O'Day at her most affecting, balancing her trademark sophistication with the world-weary resignation of one who has loved and lost"

== Track listing ==
1. "That Old Feeling" (Lew Brown, Sammy Fain) - 2:31
2. "Angel Eyes" (Earl Brent, Matt Dennis) - 3:42
3. "The Thrill Is Gone" (Brown, Ray Henderson) - 2:16
4. "Detour Ahead" (Lou Carter, Herb Ellis, Johnny Frigo) - 4:26
5. "Yesterdays" (Otto Harbach, Jerome Kern) - 5:14
6. "Waiter, Make Mine Blues" (Ray Biondi, Anita O'Day) - 3:24
7. "Whatever Happened to You" (Al Cohn, Tom Garlock, Herb Wasserman) - 4:45
8. "When Sunny Gets Blue" (Marvin Fisher, Jack Segal) - 3:05
9. "Stella by Starlight" (Ned Washington, Victor Young) - 2:53
10. "Mad About the Boy" (Noël Coward) - 3:29
11. "A Blues Serenade" (Vincent Grande, Jimmy Lytell, Mitchell Parish, Frank Signorelli) - 3:04
12. "Goodbye" (Gordon Jenkins) - 3:40

== Personnel ==
- Anita O'Day - vocals
- Russell Garcia - arranger
- Barney Kessel - guitar
- Bud Shank - saxophone, flute
