= Anita O'Day Swings Cole Porter with Billy May =

Studio album by Anita O'Day
- Released: 1959
- Recorded: April 2 & 9, 1959
- Venue: Los Angeles
- Studio: Radio Recorders
- Genre: Vocal jazz
- Length: 43:02
- Label: Verve
- Producer: Norman Granz

Anita O'Day chronology
Cool Heat (1959)	Anita O'Day Swings Cole Porter with Billy May (1959)	Anita O'Day and Billy May Swing Rodgers and Hart (1959)

Professional ratings
Review scores
Source	Rating
Allmusic	4/5 stars
The Penguin Guide to Jazz Recordings	3.5/4 stars

Anita O'Day Swings Cole Porter with Billy May is a 1959 studio album by Anita O'Day, of songs written by Cole Porter arranged by Billy May.

O'Day and May recorded another album dedicated to a single composer, Richard Rodgers, in 1960.

== Track listing ==
1. "Just One of Those Things" – 2:05
2. "Love for Sale" – 2:42
3. "You'd Be So Nice to Come Home To" – 1:48
4. "Easy to Love" – 2:01
5. "I Get a Kick Out of You" – 2:21
6. "All of You" – 1:40
7. "Get Out of Town" – 2:28
8. "I've Got You Under My Skin" – 1:47
9. "Night and Day" – 1:59
10. "It's De-Lovely" – 2:03
11. "I Love You" – 1:56
12. "What Is This Thing Called Love?" – 2:30

CD bonus tracks

13. "You're the Top" – 2:24
14. "My Heart Belongs to Daddy" – 2:51
15. "Why Shouldn't I?" – 3:06
16. "From This Moment On" – 3:09
17. "Love for Sale" – 3:34
18. "Just One of Those Things" – 2:38

All songs written by Cole Porter.

== Personnel ==
- Anita O'Day – vocals
- Billy May – arranger, conductor
