= The Man with a Horn =

"The Man With a Horn"

Song
- Released: 1946
- Genre: Jazz, swing, big band
- Songwriters: Bonnie Lake, Jack Jenney
- Lyricist: Eddie DeLange

The Man with a Horn (sometimes titled, "Man with a Horn") is a popular song composed by Bonnie Lake and Jack Jenney with lyrics by Eddie DeLange. It was first recorded by Boyd Raeburn and his orchestra in 1946 who used the song as one of his band's theme songs, the others being "Over the Rainbow" and "Raeburn's Theme". It was also recorded that same year by Randy Brooks and his orchestra. It was later recorded by Ray Anthony and his orchestra in 1950 and by trumpeter Jimmy Zito in 1948. The song was also performed by Harry James in the 1944 Metro-Goldwyn-Mayer film Two Girls and a Sailor. The song bears no relation to the 1950 motion picture,Young Man with a Horn starring Doris Day and Kirk Douglas, despite its similar title. It was recorded as an instrumental piece until 1949 when the first version with lyrics was released, performed on the Armed Forces Radio Services radio program Personal Album #1599 by Mark Carter with songwriter Bonnie Lake. It has since been covered by numerous jazz vocalists including Della Reese, Cheryl Bentyne and Nina Simone.
