= Let Me off Uptown =

Single by Gene Krupa and His Orchestra with Anita O'Day and Roy Eldridge
- B-side: "Flamingo"
- Released: June 1941
- Recorded: May 1941
- Genre: Jazz; swing
- Label: Okeh
- Songwriters: Earl Bostic; Redd Evans

Anita O'Day singles chronology
"Just a Little Bit South of North Carolina" (1941)	"Let Me off Uptown" (1941)	"Stop! The Red Light's On" (1941)

"Let Me off Uptown" is a song originally recorded by Gene Krupa and His Orchestra, along with vocals by Anita O'Day and a trumpet solo by Roy Eldridge. The song was among the hits the group had together during the 1940s, rising into the top-10 of the US pop chart in 1941. Written by Earl Bostic and Redd Evans, its lyrics describe the uptown Harlem neighborhood in New York City. The song has since been considered an example of racial integration in American music for featuring Eldridge (a black musician) alongside an all-white band.

== Background ==
Drummer Gene Krupa formed his own orchestra after leaving Benny Goodman's group in 1938. He was considered "the first drummer to be a superstar", according to AllMusic's Scott Yanow and would go on to have US pop hits in the 1940s, often being fronted by other vocalists or instrumentalists. Among Krupa's lead vocalists was Anita O'Day, who joined in 1941 alongside trumpeter, Roy Eldridge. Krupa thought that Eldridge and O'Day had musical chemistry and started looking for material for them to cut with his group. Among their hit songs collaboratively was "Let Me off Uptown", which was composed by Earl Bostic and Redd Evans. According to O'Day, Evans was an "old friend" of hers who brought the song in hopes that it would bring her commercial success.

== Content and recording ==
The title of the song was in reference to the Harlem neighborhood of New York City, which is considered to be in its uptown section. The song's characters name specific places in the uptown neighborhood they enjoy visiting, such as "rib joints", "juke joints" and "hep joints". O'Day (who was raised in Chicago's uptown neighborhood) did not have a clear understanding of Harlem and had Krupa band member, Waverly Ivy, take her there so she "could check out the atmosphere". Redd was not pleased with the way O'Day phrased the word "uptown" in her performance, which prompted her to take vocal lessons with coach Miriam Spier. After a lesson with Spier, "Let Me off Uptown" was then recorded with Krupa and His Orchestra. It featured vocal dialogue and a trumpet solo by Eldridge, along with a vocal dialogue and a vocal singing solo by O'Day. The official recording session took place in May 1941 in New York City. According to sheet music published by Lush Life, "Let Me off Uptown" is sung in the key of D and the trumpet solo goes up to G.

== Release, chart performance and legacy ==
"Let Me off Uptown" was released as the A-side to a 78 RPM single by Okeh Records in June 1941. It was credited to Krupa, his orchestra, O'Day and Eldridge. The B-side was a cover of "Flamingo" credited to Krupa and His Orchestra, along with vocals by Howard LuLany. It became a top-10 single on the US Billboard Music Popularity Chart in 1941, rising to the number ten position that year. Along with the song "Thanks for the Boogie Ride", "Let Me off Uptown" was filmed as a soundie in 1942, appearing in cinemas across the US during this period. Because Eldridge (a black musician) was part of an all-white band (including O'Day), "Let Me off Uptown" has been considered to be an example of racial integration in jazz music. In reference to the song, NPR's Simon Retmer wrote in 2011, "When Gene Krupa invited Roy Eldridge to play lead trumpet in his band in the early '40s, it made a statement: Few musicians broke the color barrier during this time. So it's unsurprising that Krupa infamously brawled with a racist music presenter who refused to let Eldridge enter a theater before a gig."

== Track listings ==
78" RPM single

- "Let Me off Uptown" (Gene Krupa and His Orchestra – Vocal chorus by Anita O'Day and Roy Eldridge)
- "Flamingo" (Gene Krupa and His Orchestra – Vocal chorus by Howard DuLany)

== Charts ==
Weekly chart performance for "Let Me off Uptown"
Chart (1941)	Peak position
US Music Popularity Chart (Billboard)	10
