= Anita O'Day and Billy May Swing Rodgers and Hart =

Studio album by Anita O'Day
- Released: 1960
- Recorded: June 6–8, 1960
- Genre: Vocal jazz
- Length: 29:33
- Label: Verve
- Producer: Norman Granz

Anita O'Day chronology
Anita O'Day Swings Cole Porter with Billy May (1959)	Anita O'Day and Billy May Swing Rodgers and Hart (1960)	Waiter, Make Mine Blues (1961)

Anita O'Day and Billy May Swing Rodgers and Hart is a 1960 studio album by American jazz singer Anita O'Day, arranged by Billy May. O'Day and May had previously recorded an album dedicated to a single composer, Cole Porter, in 1959.

== Reception ==
Professional ratings
Review scores
Source	Rating
AllMusic	3.5/5 stars
The Penguin Guide to Jazz Recordings	3/4 stars
The Virgin Encyclopedia of Fifties Music	4/5 stars

In a review for AllMusic, John Bush wrote: "Broadway fans could understandably fear that O'Day and May would pulverize the waltzing balladry of Rodgers as well as Hart's intricate wordplay. They should have realized that, like the breakneck yet technically perfect performances of bop originators Charlie Parker and Dizzy Gillespie, O'Day would miss no subtleties -- and would probably add some of her own -- while she graced these energized versions of American pop classics."

The authors of The Penguin Guide to Jazz Recordings remarked that the album "starts on a wild high... and just goes on from there." They commented: "O'Day is a natch for Hart's clever lyrics and multiple rhymes and there isn't a poor track on it."

Marc Myers, writing for All About Jazz, called the album a "gem," and stated that it "intermingles ferocious band arrangements and tender string charts on some of the American Songbook's most novel tunes. In nearly every case, O'Day's interpretation is bursting with peppery swing and cool seduction... every track on Rodgers and Hart is an stunning knockout."

== Track listing ==
1. "Johnny One Note" – 1:54
2. "Little Girl Blue" – 3:03
3. "Falling in Love With Love" – 1:31
4. "Bewitched, Bothered and Bewildered" – 4:22
5. "I Could Write a Book" – 2:13
6. "Have You Met Miss Jones?" – 1:55
7. "Lover" – 2:05
8. "It Never Entered My Mind" – 2:26
9. "Ten Cents a Dance" – 2:19
10. "I've Got Five Dollars" – 1:48
11. "To Keep My Love Alive" – 3:14
12. "Spring Is Here" – 2:43

All music composed by Richard Rodgers, all lyrics by Lorenz Hart.

== Personnel ==
=== Performance ===
- Anita O'Day – vocals
- Jimmy Rowles - piano
- Joe Mondragon - double bass
- Alvin Stoller - drums
- Billy May – arranger, conductor
