= Songs by Anita O'Day =

Studio album by Anita O'Day
- Released: 1954
- Recorded: April and June 1954
- Genre: Vocal jazz
- Label: Norgran
- Producer: Norman Granz

Anita O'Day chronology
Anita O'Day Collates (1953)	Songs by Anita O'Day (1954)	Anita (1956)

Songs by Anita O'Day is a studio album by American singer Anita O'Day. It was released in 1954 by Norgran Records and was the debut studio album of her career. The disc comprised eight tracks featuring songs written by Rodgers and Hart, George and Ira Gershwin, among others. On 1955 it was re-released under the title An Evening with Anita O'Day and included 12 tracks in total. It was reviewed positively by critics in the years that followed.

== Background, recording and content ==
Anita O'Day moved into a solo career after years of working as a vocalist in big bands. She began recording with Norman Granz's Clef label in 1952 and in 1954, Granz announced the formation of his latest label named Norgran Records, which was set to release 100 LP's during the year. Songs by Anita O'Day was recorded in Los Angeles in an April and June 1954 session. Granz served as the album's sole producer. The songs were recorded with a quartet that included Arnold Ross and Barney Kessel. The project consisted of eight tracks, including O'Day's self-composed "Anita's Blues", along with the Rodgers and Hart tune "I Didn't Know What Time It Was" and the Gershwin song "The Man I Love".

== Release and critical reception ==
Songs by Anita O'Day was released in 1954 by Norgran Records as a ten-inch vinyl LP, featuring four sides on each side of the record. It was reissued in 1955 under the title An Evening with Anita O'Day. The album featured four additional tunes and was issued first by Norgran Records and later by Verve Records. "Low-key, modestly produced, this is best heard as directed -- in the evening," concluded AllMusic's Richard S. Ginell in his review of the disc. Songs by Anita O'Day was also given critical commentary, beginning with CashBox in 1955: "The entire package has that mood music flavor since Anita is assisted by only a piano. Chirp sings like a dream. Miss O’Day is a strong seller among jazz afficionados." It was reviewed by AllMusic's Ron Wynn, who rated it three out of five stars and wrote, "O'Day heads her own group, plus sings with power. Also reissued under different title." In reviewing a compilation containing the songs from the original project, Jazz Journal favorably wrote, "Excellent songs, high standards, and always in the spotlight one of the finest jazz singers of all time captured in her prime."

== Track listing ==
Side one
No.	Title	Writer(s)	Length
1.	"Gypsy in My Soul"	Boland; Jaffe	2:31
2.	"Just One of Those Things"	Porter	2:39
3.	"The Man I Love"	George and Ira Gershwin	4:10
4.	"Frankie and Johnny"	Leighton; Bunch	3:35

Side two
No.	Title	Writer(s)	Length
1.	"Anita' Blues"	O'Day	3:25
2.	"I Cover the Waterfront"	Heyman; Green	3:45
3.	"I Didn't Know What Time It Was"	Rodgers and Hart	2:40
4.	"Let's Fall in Love"	Arlen; Koehler	2:25

== Personnel ==
All credits are adapted from the discography in O'Day's autobiography, High Times Hard Times (compiled by Robert A. Sixsmith and Alan Eichler).

- Monte Budwig – bass
- Norman Granz – producer
- Barney Kessel – guitar
- Jackie Mills – drums
- Anita O'Day – vocals
- Arnold Ross – piano

== Release history ==
Release history and formats for Songs by Anita O'Day and An Evening with Anita O'Day
Region	Date	Format	Label	Ref.
Various	1954	LP 10-inch mono	Norgran Records	
Various	1955	LP mono	Norgran Records	
Various	1957	LP mono; LP mono (Hollywood Pressing)	Verve Records; Columbia Records	
