= All the Sad Young Men (album) =

Studio album by Anita O'Day
- Released: 1962
- Recorded: October 16, 1961
- Studio: Van Gelder Studio, Englewood Cliffs, NJ
- Genre: Jazz
- Length: 34:17
- Label: Verve V-8442
- Producer: Creed Taylor

Anita O'Day chronology
Trav'lin' Light (1961)	All the Sad Young Men (1962)	Time for 2 (1962)

All the Sad Young Men is a 1962 album by Anita O'Day, arranged by Gary McFarland and produced by Creed Taylor.

== Reception ==
Professional ratings
Review scores
Source	Rating
Allmusic	4.5/5 stars
The Penguin Guide to Jazz Recordings	3.5/4 stars

Richard S. Ginell reviewed the reissue of the album for Allmusic and wrote that on the album O'Day was "served with a collection of brilliant, difficult big-band charts, courtesy of a 27-year-old emerging master named Gary McFarland who mixed instrumental voices and tempo changes in querulous, turbulent combinations" and highlighted "You Came a Long Way From St. Louis" as being "enlivened with sprouting shafts of outlaw muted brass and reeds". Ginell wrote that it was "...a tribute to O'Day's abilities that she makes it all sound easy, exhibiting a freedom in phrasing and improvising that is extraordinary even for her".

== Track listing ==
1. "Boogie Blues" (Remo Biondi, Gene Krupa) – 3:44
2. "You Came a Long Way from St. Louis" (John Benson Brooks, Bob Russell) – 4:12
3. "I Want to Sing a Song" (Margo Guryan, Gary McFarland) – 2:42
4. "A Woman Alone with the Blues" (Willard Robison) – 3:18
5. "The Ballad of the Sad Young Men" (Fran Landesman, Tommy Wolf) – 4:23
6. "Do Nothing till You Hear from Me" (Duke Ellington, Russell) – 4:08
7. "One More Mile" (McFarland, Bobby Paxton) – 2:39
8. "Night Bird" – 3:56
9. "Up State" (McFarland) – 2:30
10. "Señor Blues" (Horace Silver) – 2:45

== Personnel ==
- Anita O'Day – vocals
- Bernie Glow, Herb Pomeroy, Doc Severinsen – trumpet
- Bob Brookmeyer, Willie Dennis – trombone
- Phil Woods, Walter Levinsky – clarinet, alto saxophone
- Zoot Sims – tenor saxophone, woodwind
- Hank Jones – piano
- Barry Galbraith – guitar
- George Duvivier – double bass
- Roy Haynes – drums
- Gary McFarland – arranger, conductor

=== Production ===
- Sung Lee – art direction, design
- Suzanne White – design coordinator
- Richard Seidel – executive producer
- Dom Cerulli – liner notes
- Kevin Reeves – mastering
- Pete Turner – photography
- Creed Taylor – producer
- Rudy Van Gelder – engineer
- Tom Greenwood – production assistant
- Carlos Kase, Bryan Koniarz, Terri Tierney – production coordination
- Ben Young – research, restoration
- Jerry Rappaport – supervisor
- Deborah Hay – text editor
