= Rules of the Road (Anita O'Day album) =

Studio album by Anita O'Day
- Released: 1993
- Recorded: March 29–30, 1993
- Genre: Vocal jazz
- Length: 64:33
- Label: Pablo
- Producer: Buddy Bregman

Anita O'Day chronology
Live in Person (1993)	Rules of the Road (1993)	Wave: Live at Ronnie Scott's (1993)

Professional ratings
Review scores
Source	Rating
Allmusic	1/5 stars
The Penguin Guide to Jazz Recordings	3.5/4 stars

Rules of the Road is a 1993 studio album by Anita O'Day.

== Track listing ==
1. "Rules of the Road" (Cy Coleman, Carolyn Leigh) – 3:29
2. Medley: "Black Coffee"/"Detour Ahead" (Sonny Burke, Paul Francis Webster)/(Lou Carter, Herb Ellis, Johnny Frigo) – 5:18
3. "Shaking the Blues Away" (Irving Berlin) – 3:43
4. "Music That Makes Me Dance" (Bob Merrill, Jule Styne) – 5:40
5. "As Long as There's Music" (Sammy Cahn, Styne) – 4:11
6. "Sooner or Later" (Fred Ebb, Stephen Sondheim) – 5:00
7. "What Is a Man?" (Lorenz Hart, Richard Rodgers) – 3:28
8. "Here's That Rainy Day" (Johnny Burke, Jimmy Van Heusen) – 4:40
9. "It's You or No One" (Cahn, Styne) – 5:15
10. "I Told Ya I Love Ya, Now Get Out" (Lou Carter, Herb Ellis, Johnny Frigo) – 3:48
11. "Didn't We?" (Jimmy Webb) – 4:41
12. "Nobody Does It Better" (Marvin Hamlisch, Carole Bayer Sager) – 5:13
13. "Soon It's Gonna Rain" (Tom Jones, Harvey Schmidt) – 4:44
14. "The Lonesome Road" (Gene Austin, Nathaniel Shilkret) – 5:23

== Personnel ==
- Anita O'Day – vocals
- The Jack Sheldon Orchestra
- Buddy Bregman – arranger, conductor
- Buddy Bregman, Alan Eichler – Producers
