= Anita (album) =

Studio album by Anita O'Day
- Released: March 1956
- Recorded: December 6–8, 1955
- Studio: Capitol Studios
- Genre: Jazz; pop
- Label: Verve
- Producer: Buddy Bregman

Anita O'Day chronology
Songs by Anita O'Day (1954)	Anita (1956)	Pick Yourself Up with Anita O'Day (1957)

Singles from Anita
- 1. "You're the Top" Released: August 1956

Anita is a studio album by American singer, Anita O'Day. It was released in March 1956 by Verve Records and was the second studio album of her career. The project was also the first for the newly-formed Verve label after O'Day was chosen to sign with them by Buddy Bregman. It has been considered a classic album in O'Day's discography for its mix of jazz and pop stylings used in 12 of the standard tracks chosen.

== Background ==
Anita O'Day first garnered acclaim and commercial success in the 1940s as a big band singer alongside Gene Krupa and Stan Kenton. She then went into a solo career, finding her greatest success with a series of jazz albums recorded for the newly-established Verve label. Her first Verve effort was 1956's Anita. According to O'Day's autobiography, arranger, Buddy Bregman, and Verve founder, Norman Granz, were looking over a list of jazz artists when Bregman noticed O'Day's name. Bregman recalled that she went to his Chicago junior high school and decided to "take a chance" on her. O'Day became the first artist to sign with Granz's new label in 1955.

== Recording and content ==
Anita was recorded in three sessions on December 6, December 7 and December 8, 1955 at Capitol Studios in Los Angeles. Arrangements, conducting and production were oversaw by Bregman. O'Day recalled being impressed by the studio and praised its "great acoustics". O'Day also was fond of the session players chosen by Bregman, calling them "all tops" and "Class A" musicians. She also admired the album's sound engineer who was known being a musical collaborator of Doris Day.

The material on Anita was chosen entirely by Bregman and given final approval by Grantz, resulting in a 12-track collection. The material was labeled by DownBeat, writer Walt Friedwald and O'Day herself as pop in style. The music backing O'Day featured a mix of big band orchestras, a rhythm section and strings while the material chosen for the project were American standard songs. Among them was Cole Porter's "You're the Top", Fats Waller's "Honeysuckle Rose" and the George–Ira Gershwin tune "Who Cares?" The latter song was originally from the Broadway musical, Of Thee I Sing. "Fine and Dandy" was also a Broadway original that first appeared in Ziegfeld Follies.

== Critical reception ==
Professional ratings
Review scores
Source	Rating
AllMusic	4.5/5 stars
DownBeat	5/5 stars

Anita received positive critical acclaim from writers and critics. DownBeat rated the album five out of five stars and chose to review it because they considered Anita "a major female jazz singer" despite it being a pop collection. The publication described the trombone section as "crisp" and found that the strings "hardly ever get in the way" of O'Day. They concluded by further praising the project. Billboard considered the album a jazz collection with "a happy sound". "Annetive looking and rounding set is Miss O'Day's most potent effort in a welcome 'comeback'," the publication wrote.

CashBox called it "a superb effort", praising O'Day's phrasing and the choice of material. They concluded, "This corner wouldn’t be surprised if this waxing takes the jazz-wise public by storm. Anita’s voice has a unique character that’s tough to beat." AllMusic's Scott Yanow gave the album 4.5 out of 5 possible stars and wrote, "Anita O'Day is heard in prime form on this early Verve date. One of her better recordings, this date is recommended." Walt Friedwald, author of the book A Biographical Guide to the Great Jazz and Pop Singers called the record "an instant classic" with arrangements that do not overpower the album.

== Release and aftermath ==
Anita was originally released by Verve Records in March 1956 and was the second studio album of her career. It was originally offered as a 12-inch vinyl LP that featured six recordings on each side of the disc. In 1963, the album was re-released under a different title, This Is Anita. In August 1956, "You're the Top" was issued as the album's lead single. O'Day recalled that the project received heavy promotion from Granz who put trade ads for it in several magazines. Additionally, O'Day remembered seeing her face being featured on the covers of Cash Box and Metronome magazines after its release. According to Bregman, Anita sold an estimated 185,000 units and made him successful in the jazz field.

== Track listing ==
Details taken from the original 1956 liner notes may differ from other sources. Song length was not included in the original liner notes, therefore song lengths are taken from the 1963 reissue This Is Anita.

Side one
No.	Title	Writer(s)	Length
1.	"You're the Top"	Porter	2:23
2.	"Honeysuckle Rose"	Razaf; Waller	3:11
3.	"A Nightingale Sang in Berkeley Square"	Sherwin; Maschwitz	3:58
4.	"Who Cares?"	George and Ira Gershwin	3:11
5.	"I Can't Get Started"	I. Gershwin; Duke	3:50
6.	"Fine and Dandy"	Swift; Warburg	2:21

Side two
No.	Title	Writer(s)	Length
1.	"As Long as I Live"	Arlen; Koehler	3:35
2.	"No Moon at All"	Evans; Mann	2:25
3.	"Time After Time"	Cahn; Styne	4:03
4.	"I'll See You in My Dreams"	Jones; Kahn	2:45
5.	"I Fall in Love Too Easily"	Cahn; Styne	2:50
6.	"Beautiful Love"	Gillespie; King; Van Alstyne; Young	2:34

== Personnel ==
All credits are adapted from the CD liner notes of Anita.

Musical and technical personnel

- Buddy Bregman – arranger, conductor
- Milt Bernhart – trombone
- Alex De Paola – photography
- Corky Hale – harp
- Joe Howard – trombone
- Barney Kessel – guitar
- Joe Mondragon – double bass
- Anita O'Day – vocals
- Paul Smith – piano, celeste
- Alvin Stoller – drums
- Lloyd Ulyate – trombone
- Si Zentner – trombone

== Release history ==
Release history and formats for Anita and This Is Anita
Region	Date	Format	Label	Ref.
Various	March 1956	LP mono	His Master's Voice; Verve Records	
Various	1958	LP	Sinter Records; Verve Records	
Various	1963	LP reissue	La Voz De Su Amo; Verve Records	
Japan	1976–1986	LP mono; compact disc	Verve Records	
United States and Japan	1990	Compact disc	Verve Records	
Japan	1995–2000	Compact disc	Verve Records	
United States	2000	Compact disc	Jazz Heritage Society; Verve Records	
Japan	2003–2016	Compact disc	Verve Records	
Various	Circa 2020	Music download; streaming	Verve Records	
