= Anita O'Day at Mister Kelly's =

Live album by Anita O'Day
- Released: 1958
- Recorded: April 27, 1958
- Genre: Vocal jazz
- Length: 43:04
- Label: Verve

Anita O'Day chronology
| The Lady is a Tramp (1957) | Anita O'Day at Mister Kelly's (1958) | Cool Heat (1959) |

Anita O'Day at Mister Kelly's is a 1958 live album by Anita O'Day, recorded at Mister Kelly's in Chicago.

== Reception ==
The AllMusic review by Richard S. Ginell awarded the album 4 stars stating "Caught live with just her piano trio at Chicago's famous now-defunct nightclub, Anita O'Day is in an ebullient mood as she tosses off a series of standards and novelties. Whether this is an accurate snapshot of her live act is open to question; the stage business in between numbers seems rather formal and one doesn't really feel the excitement of a live performance. Yet O'Day is clearly in a creative mood, whether allowing her vulnerability to show in the torchy ballads or reveling in the boppish up-tempo workouts. Her vocal on "Tea for Two" is a virtuoso deconstruction, full of satiric quotes and rhythmic shifts at a warp-speed tempo. Fleet-fingered Joe Masters decorates the fills with standard bop runs on the slightly-out-of-tune house piano.".

Professional ratings
Review scores
| Source | Rating |
|---|---|
| AllMusic | 4/5 stars |
| The Rolling Stone Jazz Record Guide | 3/5 stars |

== Track listing ==
1. "But Not for Me" (George Gershwin, Ira Gershwin) – 3:09
2. "I Have a Reason for Living" (Joe Albany, Aileen Albany) – 4:52
3. "Varsity Drag" (Lew Brown, Buddy DeSylva, Ray Henderson) – 1:51
4. "My Love for You" (Edward Heyman, Harry Jacobson) – 3:06
5. "It Never Entered My Mind" (Lorenz Hart, Richard Rodgers) – 3:58
6. "Tea for Two" (Irving Caesar, Vincent Youmans) – 2:17
7. "Every Time I'm with You" – 2:08
8. "Have You Met Miss Jones?" (Hart, Rodgers) – 2:37
9. "The Wildest Gal in Town" – 3:05
10. "Star Eyes" (Gene de Paul, Don Raye) – 3:04
11. "Loneliness Is a Well" (Joe Albany, Aileen Albany) – 3:17
12. "The Song Is You" (Oscar Hammerstein II, Jerome Kern)

== Personnel ==
- Anita O'Day – vocals
- Joe Masters – piano
- John Poole – drums
- L.B. Wood – bass
