= And Her Tears Flowed Like Wine =

Song

1944 sheet music featuring Stan Kenton, Robbins Music.

"And Her Tears Flowed Like Wine" is a popular song and jazz standard by Stan Kenton first released in 1944.

== Background ==
Stan Kenton and Charles Lawrence composed the music, with lyrics by Joe Greene and copyrighted the song on September 25, 1944. The song was published by Robbins Music in New York.

The original version of the song was recorded in 1944 by Stan Kenton and His Orchestra with vocals by Anita O'Day, which was released as a 78 single on Capitol Records paired with "How Many Hearts Have You Broken". A cover version was recorded by Ella Fitzgerald with The Song Spinners and Johnny Long and also released as a 78 single on Decca Records the same year. Tony Pastor, Lavay Smith & Her Red Hot Skillet Lickers, Marina and the Kats, Byron Motley, Joe Stevenson and the Jazz Masters, and Dinah Washington with Lionel Hampton have also recorded the song.

The Stan Kenton recording was also released as a V-Disc in November, 1944 by the U.S. War Department as No. 309A. V-Discs were non-commercial 78 records intended for American military personnel stationed overseas.

== Movie appearances ==
The song was also performed in part by Lauren Bacall in the 1946 movie The Big Sleep. The lyrics sung by Lauren Bacall and Anita O'Day differed substantially from the lyrics sung by Ella Fitzgerald. The song also appeared in the film Two Guys from Milwaukee released the same year and in the 1996 TV Documentary Bogart: The Untold Story.

== Sources ==
- Easton, Carol (1981). Straight Ahead: The Story of Stan Kenton. Da Capo. ISBN 978-0-306-80152-5.
- Lee, William F. (1994). Stan Kenton: Artistry in Rhythm. Los Angeles: Creative Press. ISBN 978-0-89745-993-8.
- Sparke, Michael (2011). Stan Kenton: This Is an Orchestra!. North Texas Lives of Musicians Series. University of North Texas Press. ISBN 978-1-57441-325-0.
- Colt, Freddy (2013). Stan Kenton, il Vate del Progressive Jazz. Mellophonium Broadsides, San Remo (Italy).
