= Anita O'Day =

American jazz singer (1919–2006)

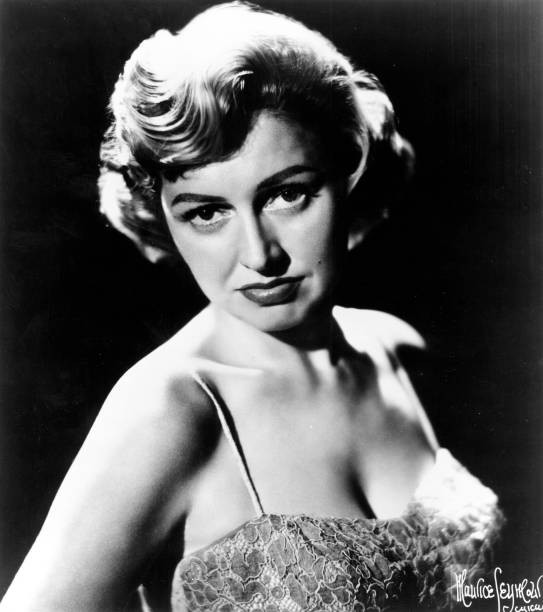
- O'Day in 1955
- Born: Anita Belle Colton; October 18, 1919; Kansas City, Missouri, U.S.
- Died: November 23, 2006 (aged 87); West Hollywood, California, U.S.
- Occupation: Singer
- Years active: 1936–2006
- Works: Discography
- Spouses: Don Carter (m. 1937; div. 1939); Carl Hoff (m. 1943; div. 1952)
- Musical career
- Origin: Chicago, Illinois
- Genres: Jazz; swing; bebop
- Instrument: Vocals
- Labels: Signature; London; Mercury; Clef; Norgran; Verve; Trio; Dobre; GNP Crescendo; Emily; DRG; Pablo; Kayo Stereophonic
- Website: anitaoday.info

Anita O'Day (born Anita Belle Colton; October 18, 1919 – November 23, 2006) was an American singer known for her work in the jazz genre. She was considered by writers an influential jazz vocalist for her ability to keep up with fast-tempo arrangements and for her characteristic vocal delivery. Her music has been acclaimed by critics and writers.

O'Day spent her early years as a walkathon contestant before discovering a true calling for her singing. She got her start performing in jazz clubs across Chicago, Illinois, before being discovered by Gene Krupa and his big band. She was hired as their lead vocalist and had US hits with songs like "Let Me off Uptown" (1941). She also was a vocalist for Stan Kenton's band and had her highest-charting US hit with the top-10 "And Her Tears Flowed Like Wine" (1944). She graduated to a solo career in 1947 where she cut records for various labels in a new jazz sub-genre called bebop. However, her use of drugs like marijuana and heroin led to several highly-publicized arrests during this period, including a six-month stint in prison in 1953.

She found success with a series of albums recorded for Verve Records between 1956 and 1964. Her LPs featured orchestras (as on 1956's Anita) and quartets, as on 1958's Anita Sings the Most. A notable performance at the Newport Jazz Festival in 1958 brought great attention to her music and career. A continued addiction to heroin led to a near-fatal overdose in 1966 that prompted O'Day to turn her life around. After getting sober, she reignited her career in the 1970s by touring in Japan and founding her own record label. A new manager, Alan Eichler, helped elevate her publicity and she made a series of US television appearances on programs like 60 Minutes and The Tonight Show Starring Johnny Carson.

In 1981, O'Day's autobiography High Times Hard Times was published, chronicling her professional and personal setbacks. Her career continued during the decade with a series of albums on her own labels and in performances such as her 50th-anniversary concert at Carnegie Hall (1985). In 1996, the mistreatment of a broken arm led to O'Day developing pneumonia and nearly dying. She made a full recovery by 1999 and continued performing in concert into the 2000s decade. Her final album, Indestructible!, was released in 2006. A documentary about her life and career, titled Anita O'Day: The Life of a Jazz Singer, premiered after her death in 2007.

== Early life ==
Anita Belle Colton was born in Kansas City, Missouri, United States, on October 18, 1919, The family moved to Chicago, Illinois, shortly after her birth. After relocating, her parents divorced and Anita was left in the care of her mother, whom she described in her autobiography as being emotionally distant: "I didn't realize at the time, of course, but she made me feel like I was keeping her from living her life." Each summer, Anita was also sent to her paternal grandparents in Kansas City, where she learned about religion and also took an interest in singing. When she was seven years old, her parents remarried and moved into a larger Chicago apartment that her father won on a round of poker. He also obtained a piano and the family learned to sing harmony together. Her father obtained a job as a printer, but spent most of his paycheck on alcohol, leading to her parents divorcing for the final time. Mrs. Colton sold the piano and moved with her daughter into a one-room Chicago apartment.

At school, Colton recalled having difficulties learning to read and was not interested in studying. After being told by a guidance counselor she would only be able to pass one subject, Colton hitchhiked to her grandparents' home in Kansas City. An uncle soon sent her back to Chicago where she returned to living with her mother. Her maternal aunt also was living her with at the time because had lost all of her finances. At the age of 14, Colton convinced her mother to leave school in order to become a contestant in the popular walkathons as a dancer. It was as a contestant that she changed her last name from Colton to "O'Day", which was Pig Latin for "dough" (in reference to the "dough" she hoped to make in the contests).

O'Day won first place in a Lindy Hop walkathon dance show, second place in an amateur show called "Dynamite Sprint" and second place in a walkathon that covered 4,000 miles over 97 days. In another contest, she was put into a mock wedding which ended abruptly after its promoter ran off. Instead, O'Day and her fellow contests raffled off a baby pig. She toured with the walk-a-thons circuits for two years, occasionally entering to specialized singing contests, including winning two Silver Dollars for performing "Is It True What They Say About Dixie?". A truancy officer soon discovered that O'Day was not attending school and sent her back to Chicago when she was 15 but she soon dropped out of school permanently at the age of 16.

== Career ==
=== 1936–1946: Early singing and commercial success as a big band vocalist ===
Following leaving school altogether in 1936, O'Day became determined to become a professional singer, beginning as a chorus girl in such uptown venues as the Celebrity Club and the Vanity Fair. She then found work as a singer and waitress at clubs including the Ball of Fire, the Vialago, and the Planet Mars. After marrying drummer Don Carter, she was hired in 1938 by DownBeat editor Carl Cons to work at his new club, called the Off-Beat, in Chicago's state street neighborhood. Also performing at the Off-Beat was the Max Miller Quartet, which backed O'Day for the first ten days of her stay there. In 1939, she was hired as vocalist for Miller's Quartet, which had a stay at the Three Deuces club in Chicago. She also auditioned as a lead vocalist for Benny Goodman's orchestra, but lost to Helen Forrest. She briefly performed Raymond Scott's band but was fired after forgetting the lyrics onstage.

While performing at the Off-Beat, she met Gene Krupa, who promised to call her if his current vocalist (Irene Daye) ever left his band. In 1941, Krupa's manager informed her that Daye was leaving the band to get married and O'Day joined his orchestra that year. Between March and May 1941, O'Day made 12 recordings in New York City with Krupa and his orchestra. From the recordings came the single, "Georgia on My Mind", which made the top 20 of the US pop chart. It was followed by the US top-10 entry, "Just a Little Bit South of North Carolina". Krupa then hired a Black trumpeter, Roy Eldridge. According to O'Day, Eldridge disliked her for consistently "upstaging him" by dancing to his trumpet solos during performances. Nonetheless, Eldridge and O'Day found commercial success with 1941's "Let Me off Uptown", which rose to number ten on the US pop chart.

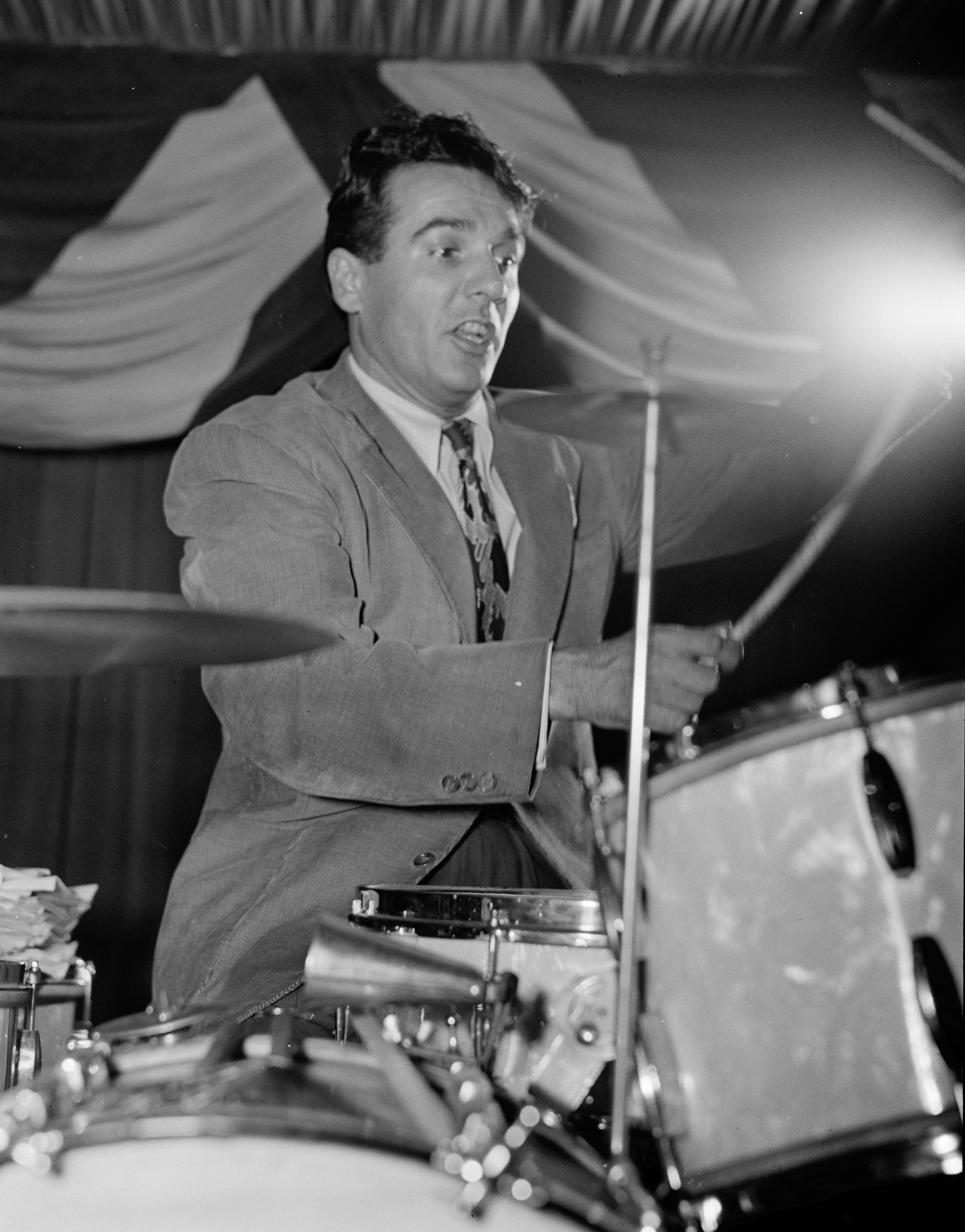
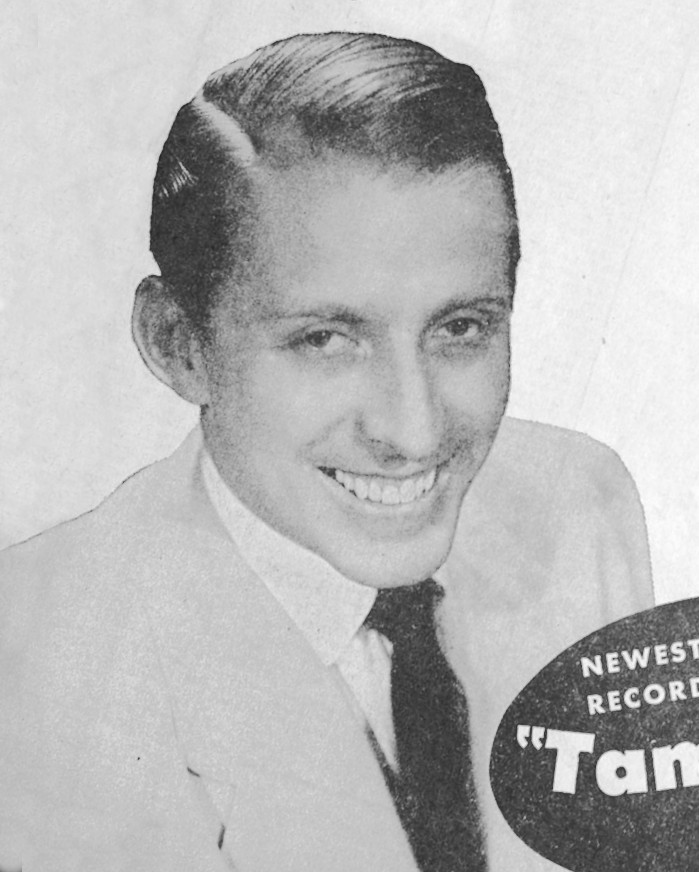
O'Day found commercial success in the 1940s as the lead vocalist in big bands by Gene Krupa (left) and Stan Kenton (right).

With O'Day's commercial success, she was named DownBeat magazine's New Star of the Year and two of her Krupa hits were turned into soundies that played in American cinemas: "Let Me off Uptown" and "Thanks for the Boogie Ride". Because the Krupa band was in-demand, O'Day traveled with his group consistently throughout 1941 and 1942, including a series of one-night engagements. While Krupa received top pay, O'Day only received $7.50 per week as the band singer, which afforded her just enough to live on while touring.

O'Day recorded nearly 20 more selections with Krupa's orchestra through 1942, including a cover of the standard, "Skylark". However, none of these recordings became US hits for the band. In 1943, O'Day received approval to take time off to marry her second husband, Carl Hoff. After agreeing to appear temporarily with the band at the Chicago's Hotel Sherman, Krupa was arrested for marijuana possession and the band broke up in 1943. O'Day proceeded to join Woody Herman for a month-long gig at the Hollywood Palladium, followed by two weeks at the Orpheum. Unwilling to tour with another big band, she left Herman after the Orpheum engagement and finished out the year as a solo artist.

In April 1944, O'Day's manager convinced her to join Stan Kenton's big band despite her belief that his group did not have the characteristics of a swing group. One month later, she recorded three sides with Kenton in Los Angeles, including the tune "And Her Tears Flowed Like Wine". It became a million-selling single, rising to number four on the US pop chart in 1944. She spent 11 months with Kenton's orchestra, recorded 21 sides (both transcription and commercial) and appeared in a Universal Pictures short titled Artistry in Rhythm (1944). O'Day also appeared in one soundie with Kenton, performing "I'm Going Mad for a Pad" and "Tabby the Cat". O'Day later said "My time with Stanley helped nurture and cultivate my innate sense of chord structure." She departed the band in 1945 after finding a replacement in Chicago identical to her in sound named Shirley Luster (she later changed her name to June Christy). Krupa's new manager then convinced O'Day to rejoin his band, which resulted in ten sides recorded between August and October 1945 in New York City. Two of her recordings with the band became top-10 hits on the US pop chart between 1945 and 1946: "Chickery Chick" and "Boogie Blues". In 1945, O'Day was named Top Girl Band Vocalist by DownBeat and Outstanding New Star by Esquire. While on-tour with Krupa, O'Day became physically drained from her busy work schedule and eventually had to quit the band after suffering from a panic attack.

=== 1947–1964: Going solo and success at Verve Records ===
O'Day became a solo artist after signing a recording contract with Bob Thiele's Signature label in 1947. At Signature, she cut a new style of jazz called bebop, that was released on singles like "Ace in the Hole", "What Is This Thing Called Love?", "How High the Moon" and "I Ain't Gettin' Any Younger". She also appeared with Woody Herman's band and with Count Basie's band at New York's Royal Roost, which resulted in five airchecks. O'Day and her second husband then attempted to open a supper club but were instead arrested for marijuana possession. Many of her counterparts moved from jazz into pop by recording novelty songs, which made O'Day's feel unseen. In July 1950, she wrote an article for DownBeat that advocated for singers to experiment more rather than just go after hits. Also in 1950, she signed recording contract with London Records and recorded material for them in Chicago. Her 1951 London cover of Patti Page's "Tennessee Waltz" became her only solo release to chart, rising to number 24 on the US Best-Selling Pop Singles chart.

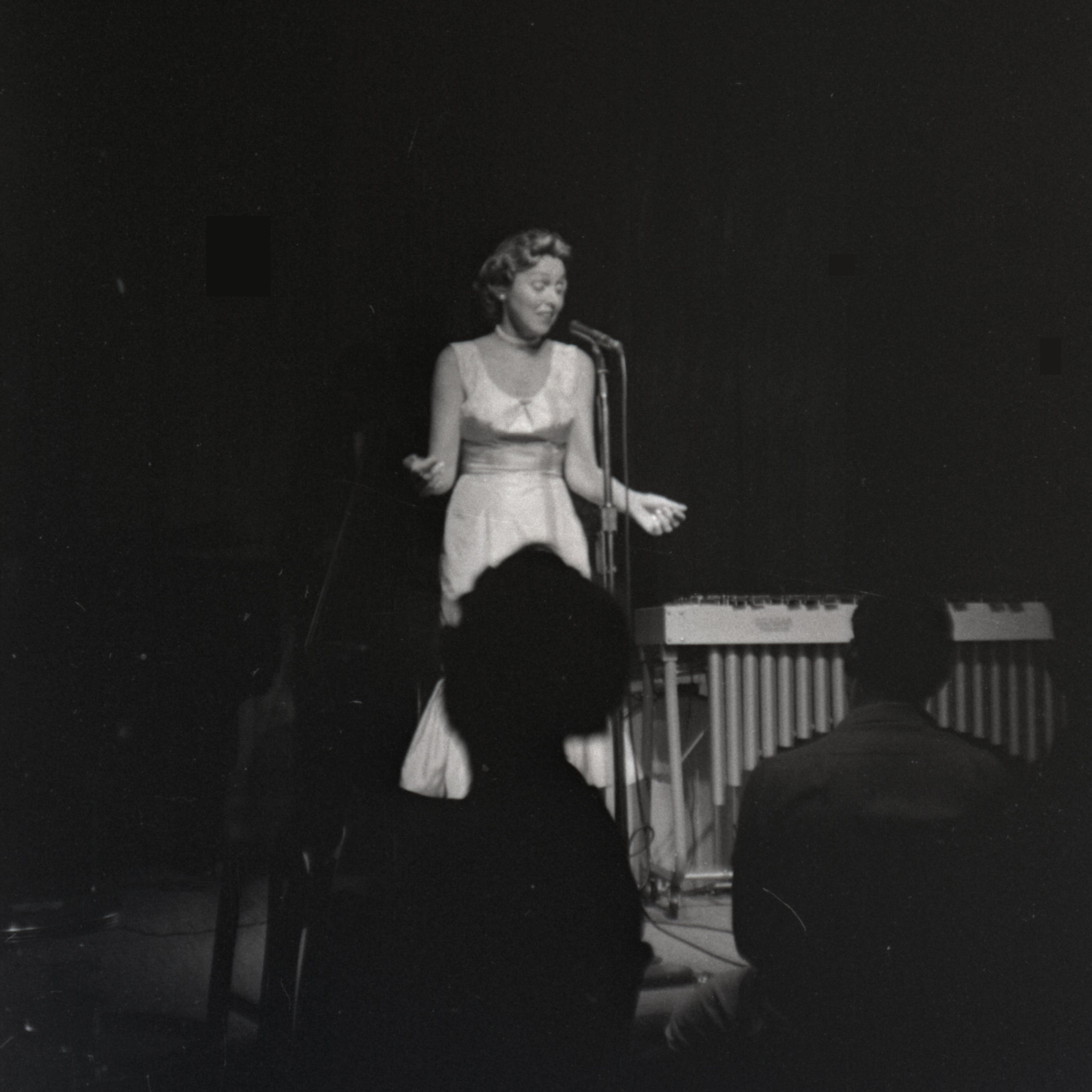
Anita O'Day performing at the Storyville Jazz Club in Boston in July, 1957. Photo: Mel Levine

O'Day recorded for two of Norman Granz's jazz labels between 1952 and 1954: Clef and Norgran. The labels issued two vinyl LP's, beginning with the 10-inch Anita O'Day Collates (1953). Mercury Records simultaneously released singles by O'Day during this period including her version of "Vaya Con Dios". During this period, she was arrested for a second time and served a prison sentence. After her release, she recorded the Norgran-issued, Songs by Anita O'Day in 1954 and was then signed to Verve Records. According to O'Day, Granz hired Buddy Bregman to produce artists at Verve. Granz then presented him with a list of potential jazz artists to sign and after seeing O'Day's name listed, he recalled her attending his Chicago middle school. Bregman then decided "to take a chance on O'Day" and signed her to Verve in 1955. O'Day's first Verve album was released in 1956 titled Anita. It featured Bregman's arrangements and a collection of American standards that fused jazz with pop. It also featured one of O'Day's signature tunes: "Honeysuckle Rose". The album helped restore O'Day's career and brought her acclaim in the jazz community.

Verve issued a string of albums by O'Day during the 1950s and 1960s that featured various arrangers and collaborators. Pick Yourself Up with Anita O'Day (1957) was her second collection of standards that fused a similar jazz–pop sound. It was also her second Verve album to feature Bregman's arrangements and orchestra. The album featured her arrangement of "Sweet Georgia Brown", which would become another signature tune. She was then backed by a smaller group on 1958's Anita Sings the Most that featured Oscar Peterson's quartet. Although O'Day felt she could not keep up with Peterson's group, critics like AllMusic's Scott Yanow felt that she was "never overshadowed" and "clearly inspired" by Peterson. Anita O'Day Sings the Winners (1958) was another project featuring a larger band and comprised 12 "winning" tracks by jazz artists O'Day admired like Duke Ellington, Benny Goodman and Dizzy Gillespie.

O'Day's comeback to work at larger jazz concerts and festivals that often included Louis Armstrong, Dinah Washington, George Shearing and Thelonious Monk. She was generally backed onstage by a trio that included John Poole, the drummer with whom she would collaborate with for the next 40 years. In New York City, she passed a drug test that permitted her and Poole to carry a cabaret card. Then, she and Poole appeared at the Village Vanguard in 1958. The same year, she appeared at the Newport Jazz Festival, which was filmed and released on the documentary Jazz on a Summer's Day. The project signified another turning point in O'Day's career by allowing jazz listeners to identify her through a visual medium rather than just on recordings. One of her concerts was recorded in Chicago and released on O'Day's first live Verve disc titled Anita O'Day at Mister Kelly's (1958).

The following year, O'Day made a cameo appearance in the biopic The Gene Krupa Story where she performed "Memories of You". In late 1959, O'Day toured Europe with Benny Goodman's orchestra. Despite O'Day's conflicts with Goodman's onstage competitiveness, she finished out the tour with him that year. O'Day then appeared on television specials such as the Timex All-Star Jazz Show and The Swingin' Years, which was hosted by Ronald Reagan. In 1959, Verve issued two studio LP's by O'Day: Anita O'Day Swings Cole Porter with Billy May and Cool Heat. The albums were collaborations with Billy May and Jimmy Giuffre respectively. Her second Billy May collaboration was issued in 1960 titled Anita O'Day and Billy May Swing Rodgers and Hart. Waiter, Make Mine Blues (1961) featured a simpler backing arrangements while Trav'lin' Light (1961) paid tribute to Billie Holiday. In 1962, O'Day collaborated with Cal Tjader on the Latin-inspired LP, Time for 2 Her final Verve album was issued in 1964 titled Incomparable! and featured arrangements by Bill Holman.

=== 1965–1979: Professional struggles and career relaunch ===
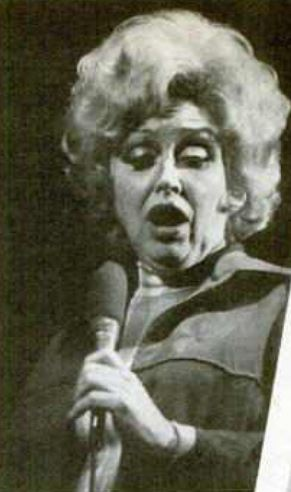
After a near-fatal drug overdose, O'Day resumed her career such as performing at the Monterey Jazz Festival (1974).

O'Day felt overshadowed by Verve's more successful jazz artist, Ella Fitzgerald, and asked Granz for a release from her recording contract. Granz did not respond to her request well, giving her $300 and telling her: "Now get out! You're just a couple [referencing John Poole as well] of junkies. You're still under contract to me, and I'll be putting out your albums when you're six feet under." Despite this, she continued performing including an appearance with Duke Ellington in September 1965 at California's Monterey Jazz Festival. She also began touring Japan during this period, after jazz clubs in the US were starting to close or cater away from "middle-income acts", as O'Day described herself in her autobiography.

In 1966, she nearly died from a heroin overdose, which prompted her to turn her life and career around. In July 1968, O'Day spent five weeks touring in Thailand and Indonesia where she played the Siam Intercontinental Hotel, the American Service Club and the Hotel Indonesia. She then returned to New York City to play the Half Note jazz club where she was roommates with Judy Garland. In 1970, she performed at the Berlin Jazz Festival and her performance was turned into a 1971 live album issued by MPS Records. O'Day also appeared in the film Zig Zag (also known as False Witness, with George Kennedy) in 1970. In 1973, she made a brief appearance in The Outfit where she is seen performing to empty seats in a fictional Bakersfield, California bar. O'Day then made a series of studio and live LPs for the Japanese market during the middle 1970s. The Trio label issued Anita 1975 (1975), Live at Mingo's (1975) and My Ship (1976) while Dobre Records issued There's Only One (1978).

In 1976, O'Day begun being managed by Alan Eichler, who created more publicity and new booking deals for her. Eichler got her work at the New York clubs Les Mouches and Marty's while simultaneously starting to write her autobiography. The club work and publicity from Eichler sparked interest from journalists who began reviewing her concerts more frequently. In 1976, The New York Times reviewed her performance at Michael's Pub, comparing her hairstyle to Dolly Parton's and highlighting her use of scat singing. The media attention brought O'Day to the attention of Gene Norman who signed her to his label, GNP Crescendo Records. It resulted in the release of 1979's Mello'day, biographer Will Friedwald described as a set of "romantic tunes". Other appearances during this time included a 1978 PBS special called Big Band Bash, where O'Day performed alongside Johnny Desmond, Warren Covington and Maynard Ferguson.

=== 1980–2006: Media exposure, memoir and final albums ===
In 1980, O'Day appeared on The Tonight Show Starring Johnny Carson for the first time and recalled being nervous about performing on the popular program. Her performance caught the attention of 60 Minutes television journalist Harry Reasoner, who received permission from O'Day to record 22 hours of her club work and interview her for the program. The segment aired on the show in 1980 and helped elevate O'Day's record sales during this period. It was followed in 1981 by the release of her autobiography, Hard Times Hard Times. She co-wrote the book with George Eels, who came to her house and recorded her speaking about her life and he put it to words. As described in its epilogue, O'Day recalled having a "mini breakdown" following its release. She cancelled the book's promotional tour and interviews on television like The Today Show. Despite this, the book drew attention from critics like The New York Times which found it to be "in the tradition of the best jazz autobiographies".

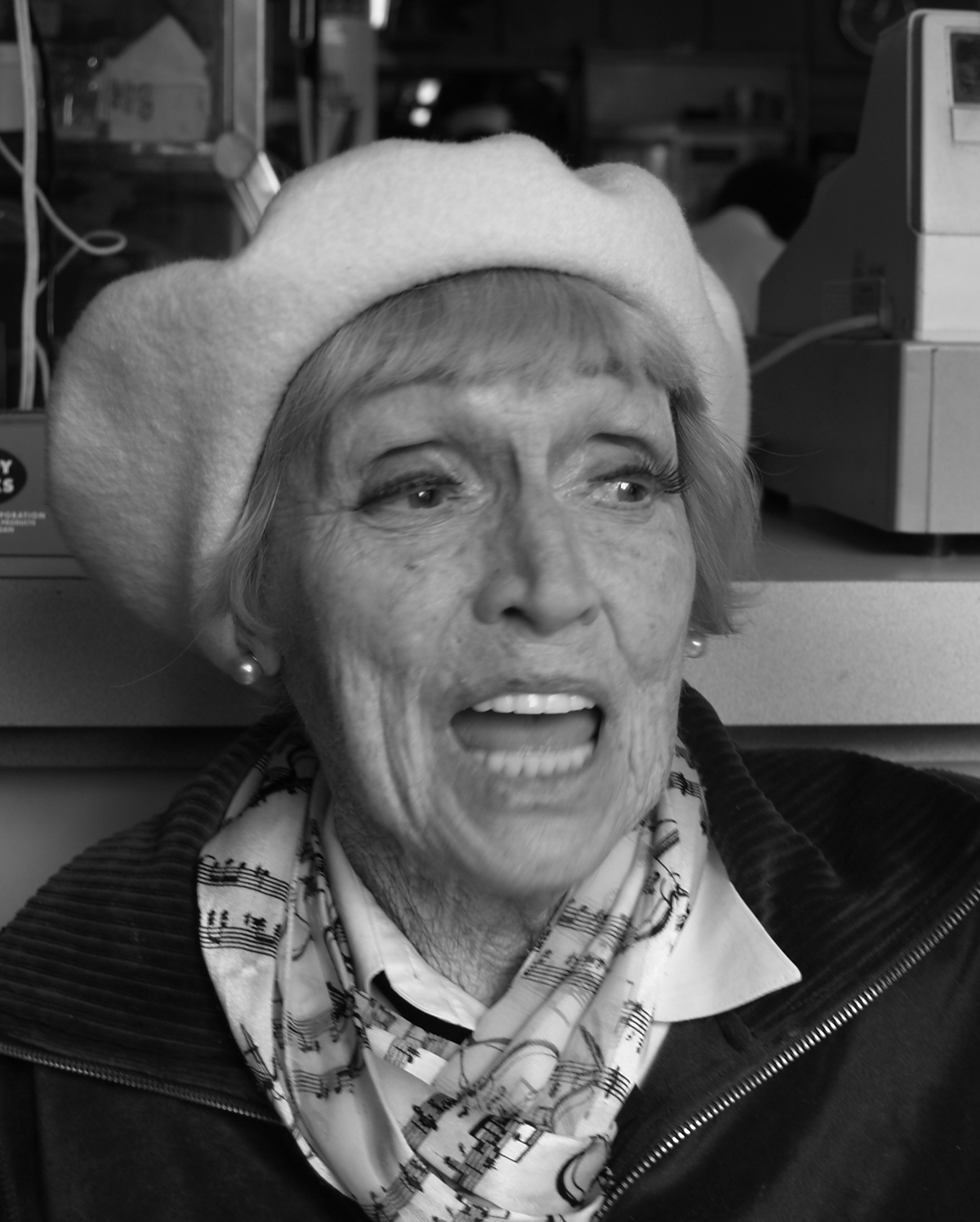
O'Day in 2005.

O'Day and John Poole had founded Emily Records by this point, which was named for her pet Yorkshire Terrier and featured a paw print as the company's logo. The company was partially run by a couple in Connecticut and was distributed nationally through catalogs. The company issue the 1980s live and studio LP's Live at the City (1980), Live at the City: The Second Set (1982), The Night Has a Thousand Eyes (1982) and A Song for You (1984). At age 65, O'Day celebrated 50 years as a jazz artist by performing at New York's Carnegie Hall. The performance was taped and released on the live LP SS 'Wonderful Big Band Concert 1985. In 1989, the DRG label issued her next studio project titled In a Mellow Tone. AllMusic's Scott Yanow named it one of best albums in years, while biographer Will Friedwald found it to be "clearly a step down" from previous recordings. The album later brought O'Day her first-ever nomination from the Grammy Awards. In 1993, O'Day reunited with Buddy Bregman for the studio project Rules of the Road, which also featured the Jack Sheldon Orchestra and was issued by Pablo Records.

Following a life-threatening fall down a staircase at the end of 1996, she made a comeback in 1999, resuming her career with the help of Alan Eichler. The same year, she performed an opening set for The Manhattan Transfer at New York's Avery Fisher Hall. She also made an appearance at the JVC Jazz Festival and celebrated her 80th birthday by performing at the Hollywood Palladium in 1999. She continued making appearances and having concerts through 2004. Between the ages of 84 and 86, O'Day recorded her final album, titled Indestructible!, which was issued by Kayo Stereophonics in 2006. The feature-length documentary Anita O'Day: The Life of a Jazz Singer, directed by Robbie Cavolina and Ian McCrudden, premiered at the Tribeca Film Festival on April 30, 2007. The project then appeared at various theaters and festivals during the late 2000s, bringing renewed attention to O'Day's life and career.

== Personal life ==
=== Marriages ===
O'Day was married twice. Her first marriage was in 1937 to jazz drummer Don Carter. She met Carter when she caught a performance of him performing at a Chicago night club and the pair soon became romantically involved. Following their marriage, the couple briefly lived with Carter's mother in Chicago, however, O'Day felt that Carter was too dependent on his mother's affection and his mother disapproved of O'Day. "I realized then that she'd never welcome me into the family," she wrote in her autobiography. Although she attempted to save the marriage, the pair decided to divorce in 1939. During this period, she met professional golfer Carl Hoff. He caught a performance of O'Day singing "My Heart Belongs to Daddy" in Chicago and grew feelings for her quickly following that. Hoff and O'Day eventually began dating after her divorce finalized and they officially wed in 1942. Hoff sporadically joined O'Day on the road, which included her first tour with Gene Krupa's band. Hoff also worked as O'Day's manager during their marriage and attempted to open a supper club with her during the 1940s. Both O'Day and Hoff had extramarital affairs, including O'Day's relationship with musician Denny Roche, and Hoff's relationship with actress Jacqueline Fontaine. The couple divorced in 1952.

=== Drug abuse, arrests and overdose ===
O'Day began abusing drugs in her teens when she first started working clubs and bars. In her autobiography, she recalled being fond of alcohol and marijuana to suppress past trauma. "I drank, got high, learned to cover up my feelings of pain behind a hip, swinging-chick personality I'd carefully developed," she wrote. While living with Hoff in March 1947, two undercover policemen came to their home, during a party at which Dizzy Gillespie was playing from the branches of a tree in their front yard. They found a small bag of marijuana, for which the couple were arrested. On August 11, Judge Harold B. Landreth found them guilty, and they were given 90-day sentences.

O'Day was then introduced to heroin by John Poole and she soon became addicted, later saying it was better than alcohol or sex. At a 1953 gig in Long Beach, California, O'Day was arrested onstage for heroin possession. In her autobiography, she claimed that the gig's piano player framed her because he handed her a packet of heroin that she was told to keep secure until the concert was over. O'Day then claimed to have gone to the restroom where she disposed of the contents, but was nonetheless arrested. It resulted in a two-week trial that reportedly included a physical altercation between O'Day's attorney and the prosecuting attorney. She was then sentenced to five months in prison and five years probation. In prison, O'Day worked in the kitchen serving food to female inmates, and cut hair as a hobby in her spare time. According to O'Day, she was released from prison in February 1954 and was put on a probation that prevented her from interacting with Carl Hoff for five years.

O'Day continued abusing heroin following her prison sentence, later describing this period of her life as "a nightmare". While working tour dates, she found random dealers and connections, which left little money leftover for income. She had eventually become so addicted to the drug that she pawned furniture in her California apartment to buy more. In 1966, O'Day was discovered by a friend unconscious on the floor of a women's restroom with a needle still in her arm. To avoid another arrest, O'Day's friend lied and told doctors that she had had a heart attack. Doctors originally could not detect a heartbeat but were eventually able to revive her. The near-fatal incident prompted O'Day to kick the drug habit completely. Instead of a rehabilitation facility, she flew to Honolulu, Hawaii, and stayed with Poole at his apartment while kicking the habit cold turkey by lying on the beach for eight hours a day. After five months, O'Day felt well enough to resume her career without feeling the cravings for the drug.

=== Health and death ===
In 1946, O'Day suffered a panic attack while on tour with Gene Krupa's band that kept her home-bound for six weeks. She was convinced that her food was poisoned and only felt safe staying in her bedroom closet for two weeks. Her second husband attempted to bring her to both a hospital and a doctor, but she refused both offers. Over the course of the six weeks, she began to slowly emerge into different rooms of her home before getting the courage to start leaving her home routinely. In her autobiography, O'Day wrote: "Although my emotional collapse lasted only six weeks early in 1946, the entire year remains, well, like a blurred dream."

O'Day also underwent two abortions during her life. In her autobiography, she recounted a brief affair with trumpet player Earl Nutter that left her with an unwanted pregnancy. "It was no great moral crisis with me any more than if I'd used some kind of birth control," she wrote. She then paid a Chicago midwife $5.00 to undergo a back-alley abortion without any anesthetics. She became pregnant a second time in the early 1950s while having an affair with Denny Roche. With the help of a friend, she paid a California doctor $400 to administer anesthesia and perform an abortion. She was still in pain after the abortion and underwent surgery where it was discovered that she had an ectopic pregnancy located in her Fallopian tube.

While living in her California trailer in November 1996, O'Day fell off a small set of stairs that resulted in a broken arm. "I was 86 pounds. I laid up there and drank and didn't eat. Then I fell down the steps," she remembered. The arm was mistreated by a hospital, which resulted in her developing pneumonia and blood poisoning. Another hospital then misdiagnosed her with alcohol-related dementia and said she would not live through the night. She was left stuck in a wheelchair but was determined to walk independently. With the help of Alan Eichler, O'Day made a full recovery and resumed her career. In November 2006, Robbie Cavolina (her last manager) entered her into a West Hollywood convalescent hospital while she recovered from pneumonia. Two days before her death, she had demanded to be released from the hospital. On November 23, 2006, at age 87, O'Day died in her sleep. The official cause of death was cardiac arrest.

== Artistry ==
O'Day's musical style was grounded in the jazz genre, but also incorporated its sub-genres of bebop and swing. O'Day often performed with fast-tempo arrangements and was able to keep up by singing (and scat singing) just as fast. AllMusic's John Bush wrote: "Few female singers matched the hard-swinging Anita O'Day for sheer exuberance and skill in all areas of jazz vocals: her splendid improvising, wide range, dynamic tone, and innate sense of rhythm made her one of the most enjoyable singer of the age." According to Richard Roland of Indiana Public Media, she routinely "had a hand in writing her own charts, so it’s likely that this style originated with O'Day herself." O'Day's use of scatting (a style of singing that excludes words) was also part of her repertoire. The Independent compared O'Day's scat singing to Ella Fitzgerald's, finding that "both women excelled with notable exuberance" and "enable[d] them to stand side by side with the great jazz horn players." O'Day often sang without the use of vibrato (the ability to hold notes), claiming that a childhood tonsillectomy removed her uvula, which aided in producing the sound to make a vibrato. She cited Mildred Bailey, Billie Holiday and Martha Raye as major influences on her musical style.

== Legacy ==
O'Day is considered by music writers as one of jazz's most remembered singers for her musical intelligence when working with other jazz musicians and for her unique vocal delivery. John Bush wrote, "O'Day's first appearances in a big band shattered the traditional image of a demure female vocalist by swinging just as hard as the other musicians on the bandstand". The New York Times quoted biographer Will Friedwald as saying, "When you think of the great jazz singers, I would think that Anita is the only white woman that belongs in the same breath as Ella Fitzgerald and Billie Holiday and Sarah Vaughan." Unlike other 1940s big band singers, O'Day refused to wear evening gowns and instead wore the same suit jackets as the male instrumentalists in the band. O'Day's music inspired other jazz singers, including June Christy, Chris Connor and Helen Merrill. In 1997, she was awarded the title of "Jazz Master" by the National Endowment of the Arts.

== Discography ==
Studio albums

- Songs by Anita O'Day (1954)
- Anita (1956)
- Pick Yourself Up with Anita O'Day (1957)
- Anita Sings the Most (1958)
- Anita O'Day Sings the Winners (1958)
- Cool Heat (1959)
- Anita O'Day Swings Cole Porter with Billy May (1959)
- Anita O'Day and Billy May Swing Rodgers and Hart (1960)
- Waiter, Make Mine Blues (1961)
- Trav'lin' Light (1961)
- All the Sad Young Men (1962)
- Anita O'Day & the Three Sounds (1963)
- Incomparable! (1964)
- Anita and Rhythm Section (1971)
- Anita 1975 (1975)
- My Ship (1976)
- There's Only One (1978)
- Mello'day (1979)
- The Night Has a Thousand Eyes (1982)
- A Song for You (1984)
- In a Mellow Tone (1989)
- Rules of the Road (1993)
- Indestructible! (2006)

== Filmography ==
=== Films ===
- Zig Zag (1970) – Sheila Mangan
- The Outfit (1973) – Herself

=== Documentaries ===
- Jazz on a Summer's Day (1959)
- Anita O'Day: The Life of a Jazz Singer (2007)
