= Live at the Palladium (Bad Religion video) =

Bad Religion: Live at the Palladium

Video by Bad Religion
- Released: March 7, 2006
- Recorded: November 20–21, 2004
- Genre: Punk rock
- Length: 133 min.
- Director: Zach Merck
- Producer: Michael J. Katz; Jeff Abarta; Craig Fanning; Brett Gurewitz; Scott Kalvert; Matt McGreevey

Bad Religion chronology
Along the Way (1990)	Bad Religion: Live at the Palladium (2006)

Professional ratings
Review scores
Source	Rating
PopMatters	8/10 stars
DVD Talk	4/5 stars
Punk News	4.5/5 stars

Live at the Palladium is a live concert DVD by the punk band Bad Religion, released in March 2006. It features footage from two nights at the Palladium in Hollywood, California on November 21 and 22, 2004.

The DVD uses seamless branching to offer two viewing options:

1. The full concert interspersed with interview footage of the band.
2. Only the concert footage.

The only Bad Religion albums that do not have songs represented in this performance (of those which were released prior to the date of the filming) are Into the Unknown, No Substance and The New America.

The version of Cease is played on a solo piano, as recorded on Greg Graffin's solo album, American Lesion.

The guest vocals on Let Them Eat War are performed by Tim McIlrath of Rise Against, whose band opened on both nights, instead of Sage Francis who performed on the studio recording.

After the band has finished playing "21st Century (Digital Boy)" Greg Graffin incorrectly identifies the song as the "Against the Grain version" when in fact they played the Stranger than Fiction version. The title card before playing "Along the Way" shows that the song is from the album How Could Hell Be Any Worse? (possibly referring to the 2004 remastered version, which includes their early discography minus Into the Unknown) when in fact the song was never recorded for an album release; it actually appears on their 1985 EP Back to the Known.

== Track listing ==
1. "Overture/Sinister Rouge"
2. "All There Is"
3. "No Control"
4. "Supersonic"
5. "Social Suicide"
6. "Los Angeles Is Burning"
7. "Modern Man"
8. "Kyoto Now!"
9. "Stranger Than Fiction"
10. "Struck a Nerve"
11. "Let Them Eat War"
12. "Suffer"
13. "Change of Ideas"
14. "God's Love"
15. "Recipe for Hate"
16. "Atomic Garden"
17. "10 in 2010"
18. "You"
19. "Come Join Us"
20. "I Want to Conquer the World"
21. "21st Century (Digital Boy)"
22. "Generator"
23. "Fuck Armageddon...This Is Hell"
24. "Anesthesia"
25. "Infected"
26. "Cease"
27. "American Jesus"
28. "Along the Way"
29. "Do What You Want"
30. "We're Only Gonna Die"
31. "Sorrow"

== Special features ==
=== Live at the New Wave Theater ===
==== 1980 ====
1. "Bad Religion"
2. "Slaves"
3. "Oligarchy"

==== 1982 ====
1. "We're Only Gonna Die"
2. "Part III"

=== Music videos ===
1. "American Jesus"
2. "Atomic Garden"
3. "Los Angeles Is Burning"
4. "Broken"
5. "Sorrow"
6. "Struck A Nerve"

=== Photo gallery ===
Features thirty-nine photos.

== Personnel ==
- Greg Graffin – Vocals, Piano
- Brett Gurewitz – Guitar, Background vocals
- Jay Bentley – Bass, Background vocals
- Greg Hetson – Guitar
- Brian Baker – Guitar, Background vocals
- Brooks Wackerman – Drums
- Tim McIlrath – Guest vocals on "Let Them Eat War"
