= All Ages =

Compilation album by Bad Religion
- Released: July 26, 1995
- Recorded: 1982–1992; Track 2 & 22: October 8, 1994
- Venue: Karen Klub in Goteborg, Sweden
- Genre: Hardcore punk, Skate punk
- Length: 50:05
- Label: Epitaph
- Producer: Bad Religion

Bad Religion chronology
Stranger Than Fiction (1994)	All Ages (1995)	The Gray Race (1996)

Professional ratings
Review scores
Source	Rating
AllMusic	4.5/5 stars
The Encyclopedia of Popular Music	4/5 stars
Music Week	5/5 stars
Punknews.org	4/5 stars
Spin	9/10
The Village Voice	A−

All Ages is a compilation album by the American punk rock band Bad Religion. It was released on July 26, 1995, through Epitaph Records. The compilation contains songs from How Could Hell Be Any Worse? to Generator, and two live tracks recorded during their 1994 European tour, which were the first tracks to feature guitarist Brian Baker.

== Background ==
All Ages contains material from five of Bad Religion's first six studio albums released on Epitaph, omitting songs from the band's second album, Into the Unknown. It also contains no tracks from the Bad Religion and Back to the Known EPs. The band had left Epitaph for Atlantic in 1993, where they reissued Recipe for Hate and began to experience major worldwide commercial success.

The live tracks "Do What You Want" and "Fuck Armageddon... This Is Hell" were recorded live at Lisebergshallen in Goteborg, Sweden, on October 8, 1994, on Bad Religion's Stranger than Fiction tour. These tracks were the first to feature guitarist Brian Baker, who had replaced Brett Gurewitz before the release of Stranger than Fiction.

== Track listing ==
No.	Title	Writer(s)	Appears on	Length
1.	"I Want to Conquer the World"	Gurewitz	No Control, 1989	2:17
2.	"Do What You Want" (Live)	Gurewitz	Previously unreleased	0:59
3.	"You Are (The Government)"	Graffin	Suffer, 1988	1:21
4.	"Modern Man"	Graffin	Against the Grain, 1990	1:53
5.	"We’re Only Gonna Die"	Graffin	How Could Hell Be Any Worse?, 1982	2:11
6.	"The Answer"	Graffin	Generator, 1992	3:20
7.	"Flat Earth Society"	Gurewitz	Against the Grain	2:21
8.	"Against the Grain"	Graffin	Against the Grain	2:06
9.	"Generator"	Gurewitz	Generator	3:17
10.	"Anesthesia"	Gurewitz	Against the Grain	2:59
11.	"Suffer"	Graffin, Gurewitz	Suffer	1:47
12.	"Faith Alone"	Graffin	Against the Grain	3:31
13.	"No Control"	Graffin	No Control	1:45
14.	"21st Century (Digital Boy)"	Gurewitz	Against the Grain	2:47
15.	"Atomic Garden"	Gurewitz	Generator	3:11
16.	"No Direction"	Graffin	Generator	3:13
17.	"Automatic Man"	Gurewitz	No Control	1:38
18.	"Change of Ideas"	Graffin	No Control	0:54
19.	"Sanity"	Gurewitz	No Control	2:44
20.	"Walk Away"	Gurewitz	Against the Grain	1:47
21.	"Best for You"	Graffin	Suffer	1:53
22.	"Fuck Armageddon... This Is Hell" (Live)	Graffin	Previously unreleased	2:11
Total length:				50:05

Japanese edition bonus track
No.	Title	Writer(s)	Appears on	Length
23.	"American Jesus"	Graffin, Gurewitz	Recipe for Hate, 1993	3:17

== Personnel ==
Adapted from the album liner notes.

Bad Religion

- Greg Graffin – vocals
- Brett Gurewitz – guitar (1, 3–21)
- Greg Hetson – guitar
- Brian Baker – guitar (2, 22)
- Jay Bentley – bass
- Bobby Schayer – drums (6, 9, 15, 16)
- Pete Finestone – drums (1, 3–5, 10–14, 17–21)

Technical

- Bad Religion – production
- Brett Gurewitz – engineering (credited as The Legendary Starbolt)
- Donnell Cameron – engineering
- Jim Mankey – engineering
- Jesse Fischer – art direction, design

== Charts ==
Chart (1995)	Peak position
Finnish Albums (Suomen virallinen lista)	20
UK Rock & Metal Albums (OCC)	25
