= 80–85 =

Compilation album by Bad Religion
- Released: November 12, 1991
- Recorded: 1980–1985
- Genre: Hardcore punk
- Length: 56:24
- Label: Epitaph
- Producer: Bad Religion

Bad Religion chronology
Against the Grain (1990)	80–85 (1991)	Generator (1992)

Professional ratings
Review scores
Source	Rating
AllMusic	3.5/5 stars
Robert Christgau	(neither)

80–85 is the first compilation album by Bad Religion, released in 1991. It is a collection of their early recordings, predating their third studio album, Suffer (1988), but excluding their controversial 1983 album, Into the Unknown.

== Background ==
80–85 includes the entire How Could Hell Be Any Worse? album as well as two official EPs (Bad Religion and Back to the Known), plus three tracks from the Public Service compilation EP.

80–85 is out of print, but on April 6, 2004, a remastered version of this album was released. It shares the same name as their 1982 debut album, How Could Hell Be Any Worse?, and includes the same track listing as 80–85. Reissues of their post-1985 releases – Suffer, No Control, Against the Grain and Generator – were released on the same day as the 2004 remastered version of this album, as well as a DVD reissue of their live VHS, Along the Way.

Cover art and interior photography contact sheets are by Edward Colver.

== Track listing ==
No.	Title	Writer(s)	Length
1.	"We're Only Gonna Die"	Graffin	2:12
2.	"Latch Key Kids"	Graffin	1:38
3.	"Part III"	Bentley	1:48
4.	"Faith in God"	Graffin	1:50
5.	"Fuck Armageddon...This Is Hell"	Graffin	2:48
6.	"Pity"	Graffin	2:00
7.	"Into the Night"	Gurewitz	3:25
8.	"Damned to Be Free"	Graffin	1:58
9.	"White Trash (2nd Generation)"	Gurewitz	2:21
10.	"American Dream"	Gurewitz	1:41
11.	"Eat Your Dog"	Graffin	1:04
12.	"Voice of God Is Government"	Bentley	2:54
13.	"Oligarchy"	Gurewitz	1:01
14.	"Doing Time"	Gurewitz	3:00
15.	"Bad Religion"	Gurewitz	1:49
16.	"Politics"	Graffin	1:21
17.	"Sensory Overload"	Gurewitz	1:31
18.	"Slaves"	Graffin	1:20
19.	"Drastic Actions"	Gurewitz	2:36
20.	"World War III"	Graffin	0:54
21.	"Yesterday"	Graffin	2:39
22.	"Frogger"	Hetson	1:19
23.	"Bad Religion"	Gurewitz	2:10
24.	"Along The Way"	Graffin	1:36
25.	"New Leaf"	Graffin	2:53
26.	"Bad Religion"	Gurewitz	1:48
27.	"Slaves"	Graffin	1:07
28.	"Drastic Actions"	Gurewitz	2:31
Total length:			56:24

== Credits ==
- Greg Graffin – vocals (all tracks)
- Brett Gurewitz – guitars (tracks 1–20 and 26–28)
- Greg Hetson – guitars (tracks 3 and 21–25)
- Jay Bentley – bass (tracks 1–20 and 26–28)
- Tim Gallegos – bass (tracks 21–25)
- Pete Finestone – drums (tracks 1, 3, 4, 6, 7, 13 and 21–25)
- Jay Ziskrout – drums (tracks 2, 5, 8–12, 14 to 20 and 26–28)
- Edward Colver – photographer

== Track notes ==
- Tracks 1–14 are from How Could Hell Be Any Worse? (their first LP, 1982).
- Tracks 15–20 are from Bad Religion (first EP, 1981).
- Tracks 21–25 are from Back to the Known (second EP, 1985).
- Tracks 26–28 are from Public Service (VA compilation album, 1981). These are different recordings of three songs from Bad Religion.
