= Along the Way =

- DVD cover
- Produced by: Matthias Kollek and Thorsten Bach
- Starring: Greg Graffin; Brett Gurewitz; Jay Bentley; Greg Hetson; Pete Finestone
- Cinematography: Matthias Kollek and Thorsten Bach
- Edited by: Matthias Kollek and Thorsten Bach
- Music by: Bad Religion
- Distributed by: Epitaph Records; Tribal Area
- Release date: August 25, 1990
- Running time: 90 min.
- Countries: United States; Germany
- Language: English

Along the Way is the first live concert DVD from punk band Bad Religion. The concert footage was taken from fourteen different European stops on their 1989 tour for the album, Suffer. It was originally released on VHS in Germany in 1990 (with a different cover) and in the United States in the following year, and on DVD for the first time in 2004, coinciding with the reissues of the band's pre-Recipe for Hate albums. Both the VHS and DVD have the same cover shown on the right, which depicts Jay Bentley with his bass, while the European VHS depicts guitarist Brett Gurewitz and singer Greg Graffin singing along with each other.

The format of the video consists of live concert performances interspersed with short interview clips of the band members. The live footage is mixed from fourteen different shows, and jumps between them for each different cut and camera angle. Although the video remains synchronized with the audio track, it is not uncommon for the band members shirts to appear to change many times during the same song. The concert featured no songs from the band's 1983 album Into the Unknown or No Control, although the latter album was released shortly after the European tour.

Title of the release is taken from the band's song of the same name, which appears on their 1985 long-out of print EP Back to the Known. This song was also played live at the concert.

== Brett Gurewitz on his drug habit ==
One of the interview portions of the video poses a question to guitarist Brett Gurewitz concerning his addiction to crack cocaine and other hard drugs.

Interviewer: Brett, you have been an addict to crack. How do you think about hard drugs today?

Brett Gurewitz: Well, I don't do it anymore. I think crack is probably the worst poison that has ever been introduced to human beings. I mean, I think personally it's worse than heroin because I experimented with heroin quite a bit, and alcohol, and um, although I guess it depends on the individual.

I will say that I'm not, I don't want to sound that like I'm anti-drug, because I'm not anti-drug. I happen to be a drug addict. And when I take a drug, I can't stop. And um, or if I have a drink, I continue drinking until I black out. So, I had to stop. But, I think that part of that has to do with my, perhaps my environment, but I think a great deal of it has to do with genetic physical causes.

I think the central nervous system of a drug addict and an alcoholic is different from the central nervous system of a non-drug addict/alcoholic. And, in fact, medical studies have been done, they've done research on the spinal cord of drug addicts and alcoholics and they find genetic differences between them so there is some kind of inherited trait. So what I think is that if you can handle it and you can use it, drugs can be good. They can be good to relax the atmosphere at a party, LSD can be very good to expand your mind, you know?

I love LSD, I just don't, I just... And I don't think that LSD is an addictive drug personally, but, I had tried to stop taking crack in the past and I tried to stop drinking in the past and say, "OK, I won't drink, I'll just smoke pot" or "I won't take crack, I'll just drink" and whatever the one thing that I decided I would do, I did so much of it to compensate for not doing anything else because that's how I was. I had to stop everything, you know?

But, I think that there are people who can handle it, and I think that for the people who can handle it, it's OK. I don't think there's anything wrong with it. I just think that, um, when it comes to the point where the pain of using the things are too great than the pain of not using them, then you have to stop.

== Tour ==
The following are the tour dates of the European Suffer Tour of 1989, where the footage was filmed.

Audio from the show in Bremen was used for the live footage.

NOTE: Any date with an asterisk (*) means no footage was filmed there for the documentary, according to the credits.

Date	City	Country	Venue
August 16, 1989	Amsterdam	Netherlands	Melkweg
August 17, 1989	Groningen	Netherlands	Vera
August 18, 1989	Aalst	Belgium	Netwerk*
August 19, 1989	Essen	West Germany	Zeche Carl*
August 20, 1989	Cologne	West Germany	Rose Club*
August 21, 1989	Bielefeld	West Germany	AJZ Bielefeld
August 22, 1989	Hannover	West Germany	UJZ Korn
August 23, 1989	Berlin	West Germany	Quartier Latin
August 24, 1989	Hamburg	West Germany	Fabrik
August 25, 1989	Bremen	West Germany	Kesselhalle
August 26, 1989	Frankfurt	West Germany	Batschkapp
August 27, 1989	Leonberg	West Germany	Beatbaracke
August 28, 1989	Vienna	Austria	Arena
August 29, 1989	St. Gallen	Switzerland	Grabenhalle*
August 30, 1989	Pisa	Italy	Macchia Nera*
August 31, 1989	Munich	West Germany	Kulturstation
September 1, 1989	Kaiserslautern	West Germany	Kammgarn
September 2, 1989	Berlin	West Germany	The Loft
September 3, 1989	London	United Kingdom	Boston Arms*

== Track listing ==
No.	Title	Writer(s)	Length
1.	"Suffer"	Graffin, Gurewitz
2.	"Land Of Competition"	Graffin
3.	"1000 More Fools"	Gurewitz
4.	"Doing Time"	Gurewitz
5.	"Damned To Be Free"	Graffin
6.	"Latch Key Kids"	Graffin
7.	"Part II (The Numbers Game)"	Gurewitz
8.	"How Much Is Enough?"	Gurewitz
9.	"Along The Way"	Graffin
10.	"Do What You Want"	Gurewitz
11.	"Faith In God"	Graffin
12.	"We're Only Gonna Die"	Graffin
13.	"Part III"	Bentley
14.	"Drastic Actions"	Gurewitz
15.	"Delirium Of Disorder"	Gurewitz
16.	"You Are (The Government)"	Graffin
17.	"Yesterday"	Graffin
18.	"Forbidden Beat"	Graffin, Gurewitz
19.	"Voice Of God Is Government"	Bentley
20.	"Frogger"	Hetson
21.	"When?"	Graffin
22.	"Fuck Armageddon...This Is Hell"	Graffin
23.	"Give You Nothing"	Graffin, Gurewitz
24.	"Pessimistic Lines" (This song is not listed on the DVD insert)	Graffin
25.	"Best For You"	Graffin
26.	"Bad Religion"	Gurewitz
27.	"Politics"	Graffin
28.	"World War III"	Graffin
Total length:			90:00

== Personnel ==
- Greg Graffin - Vocals
- Brett Gurewitz - Guitar
- Jay Bentley - Bass
- Greg Hetson - Guitar
- Pete Finestone - Drums
- Karat Faye - Engineer / F.O.H.
