= 21st Century (Digital Boy) =

1990 single by Bad Religion

Single by Bad Religion

from the album Stranger Than Fiction
- Released: January 1995
- Recorded: Original version: May 1990 at Westbeach Recorders, Hollywood, California; Later version: 1994
- Genre: Punk rock; alternative rock
- Length: 2:50 (original); 2:47 (re-release)
- Label: Epitaph Records
- Songwriter: Mr. Brett
- Producers: Andy Wallace; Bad Religion

Bad Religion singles chronology
"Struck a Nerve" (1993)	"21st Century (Digital Boy)" (1995)	"Infected" (1994)

Music video
- "21st Century (Digital Boy)" on YouTube

"21st Century (Digital Boy)" is a song by the punk rock group Bad Religion. It was originally recorded in 1990 on their fifth full-length studio album, Against the Grain, and re-recorded on their 1994 album, Stranger Than Fiction. The following year it was included on the All Ages compilation release.

Although the Against the Grain version was not released as a single, the Stranger Than Fiction version was a popular hit. The hit version was also featured on the 2002 compilation Punk Rock Songs, which was not endorsed by the band.

== Re-recording ==
In 1994, Bad Religion re-recorded the song for their eighth studio album, Stranger Than Fiction. Guitarist Brett Gurewitz claimed that Bad Religion re-recorded it because their then-label Atlantic Records said they did not "hear a single" in that album and thought the song was a hit so they asked the band to redo it.

When also asked why "21st Century (Digital Boy)" would be re-recorded for Stranger Than Fiction, bassist Jay Bentley replied:

[We re-released the song] because we were playing it every night since 1989, '90. It wasn't that we weren't happy with it. I was thrilled with it. I thought it was a great song. Brett just happened to think that we were playing it better than we played it on the record. He just thought it was the one song of his that had a snowball's chance in hell of being popular. I think one of Brett's quests as a song writer was to write a pop hit. That's hard to do when you're in a punk rock band. He always thought that song could be a pop hit, and he fought for it to get on the record and to be a single. I eventually got tired of saying 'that's not what we do'. That's what he wanted to do when he was a member of the band at the time and we all went 'well, OK, if you feel that strongly about it, we'll put it on the record'. We have a very democratic process which is that if 3 members vote one way, then it's going to happen, unless one member feels so strongly about it, then we all just concede and say that's cool.

== Meaning and composition ==
The lyrics of the song could be interpreted as a rejection of modern consumerist culture, as exemplified in the lyrics "I'm a 21st Century Digital Boy / I don't know how to live, but I've got a lot of toys". This alienation and rejection of consumerism and mainstream culture is a common theme in the music of Bad Religion. The bridge includes references to the group's two previous records (as of the original recording), Suffer and No Control. Contrary to rumor, "21st Century (Digital Boy)" was not written or performed live in 1988, nor was it going to appear on No Control.

The song pays homage to King Crimson's "21st Century Schizoid Man", even incorporating some of its lyrics towards the end:

Cat's foot iron claw
Neuro-surgeons scream for more
Innocents raped with napalm fire

The line "everything I want I really need" that follows is a play on "21st Century Schizoid Man"'s "nothing he's got he really needs." The principal difference between the two versions is after that line. On the original Against the Grain version, as the song fades out, Graffin sings the title of the song four more times with a different word instead of "digital" (including "21st Century Schizoid Boy" in reference to King Crimson's song) backed with another guitar solo. Stranger Than Fiction's version ends with one final "Ain't life a mystery?" line.

Excerpt from a 2010 interview with Greg Graffin in Scientific American:

Q: "Your most famous song is "21st Century Digital Boy," which pokes fun at our gadget-laden era."

A: "Oh no, we love technology and gadgets. We use irony in 60 percent of our music. "21st Century Digital Boy" is an ironic twist characterizing the youth of today. The truth is that even though the song was written in 1990, it was clear that the youth were going to be affected for good and bad by digital technology. It's probably because we loved video games so much."

== Music video ==
The music video shows a young child transfixed on a TV screen as the band, all in blue, appear to be "swimming" on the static screen. Director Gore Verbinski achieved this effect by using various dyes and other substances to create the illusion that the static screen is made out of water.

== Charts ==
Chart (1994–95)	Peak position
Australia (ARIA)	112
UK Singles (Official Charts)	41
US Alternative Airplay (Billboard)	11

== In modern culture ==
The Against the Grain version is available as downloadable content in both Rock Band 2 and Guitar Hero World Tour. Guitar Hero World Tour incorrectly notes 2004 instead of 1990 as its date of the song. The 2004 date could possibly be referring to Against the Grain's remastered date.

The Dylan Ratigan Show, a television program on the news channel MSNBC, used the song as background music during a segment targeting "Facebook addiction".

== "21st Century Digital Girl" ==
"21st Century Digital Girl"

Single by Groove Coverage

from the album 21st Century
- Released: June 23, 2006
- Genre: Eurodance
- Label: Universal
- Songwriters: Ole Wierk, Axel Konrad, B. Gurewitz, Lou Bega

Groove Coverage singles chronology
"On the Radio" (2006)	"21st Century Digital Girl" (2006)	"Because I Love You" (2007)

In 2006, German Eurodance group Groove Coverage released "21st Century Digital Girl", an adaptation of Bad Religion's "21st Century Digital Boy". It was the third and final single from the album 21st Century.

=== Chart positions ===
Chart (2006)	Peak position
Austria (Ö3 Austria Top 40)	32
Germany (GfK)	41
Hungary (Dance Top 40)	11
Hungary (Single Top 40)	1
