= Public Service (EP) =

Studio album by Various artists
- Released: 1981
- Recorded: 1979–1980
- Genre: Punk
- Length: 29:09
- Labels: Smoke 7 Records; Puke & Vomit Records

Public Service is a compilation album released in 1981 on Smoke 7 Records with songs by Hardcore punk bands Bad Religion, Circle One, Disability, RF7 and Redd Kross (here still named "Red Cross"). The album was re-released in 2003 on the Puke & Vomit label.

The album contains alternate versions of the Bad Religion songs 'Bad Religion', 'Slaves' and 'Drastic Actions' from their first, eponymous EP (Bad Religion). These songs are available at the end of the 80–85 compilation, and also on its 2004 re-release as How Could Hell Be Any Worse?

Thurston Moore of Sonic Youth supposedly was a big fan of the album and read lyrics from the album during spoken word shows at the 1993 Lollapalooza. This can be seen in Dave Markey's short film, Grunge Pedal. Part of this film, as well as the album itself, were shown on MTV's 120 Minutes when Moore was guest hosting.

The album was reviewed in issue #18 of the Touch and Go punk zine. The review read: "Great sampler (the months of the sampler have arrived) featuring some of LA's finest...the only shit is Disability...all else kicks dink...the Bad Religion is produced songs that appear on their 7' ' but are tons better here...Circle One kick my ass...this is a little too unheralded don't you think you should've bought this along time ago? It aint too too late...write Smoke 7 Productions 7230 DeSoto Ave Suite 104 Canoga Park Ca. 91303"

== Track listing ==
Side I
No.	Title	Writer(s)	Artist	Length
1.	"Cease to Exist"	Charles Manson	Red Cross	2:36
2.	"Everyday There's Someone New"	Jeff McDonald	Red Cross	1:10
3.	"Kill Someone You Hate"	McDonald	Red Cross	1:25
4.	"World of Hate"	Felix Alanis	RF7	1:02
5.	"Scientific Race"	Alanis	RF7	2:58
6.	"Long Live Their Queen"	Alanis	RF7	2:00
7.	"Perfect World"	Alanis	RF7	1:18
8.	"G.I. Combat"	Circle One	Circle One	0:40
9.	"High School Society"	Circle One	Circle One	1:46

Side II
No.	Title	Writer(s)	Artist	Length
1.	"Bad Religion"	Brett Gurewitz	Bad Religion	1:52
2.	"Slaves"	Greg Graffin	Bad Religion	1:11
3.	"Drastic Actions"	Gurewitz	Bad Religion	2:42
4.	"Battling Against the Police"	Darren Price	Disability	1:57
5.	"White as a Ghost"	Darren Price	Disability	2:01
6.	"Rejection"	Joe Travis	Disability	2:29
7.	"F.O."	Circle One	Circle One	0:21
8.	"Destroy Exxon"	Circle One	Circle One	1:41
Total length:				29:09
