= Los Angeles Is Burning =

2004 Bad Religion single

Single by Bad Religion

from the album The Empire Strikes First
- Released: April 27, 2004
- Recorded: November 2003 – February 2004 at Sound City in Los Angeles, California
- Genre: Punk rock
- Length: 3:23
- Label: Epitaph Records
- Songwriter(s): Brett Gurewitz
- Producer(s): Brett Gurewitz; Greg Graffin

Bad Religion singles chronology
"The Defense"	"Los Angeles Is Burning"	"The Empire Strikes First"

"Los Angeles Is Burning" is a single by the punk rock band Bad Religion from their 2004 album, The Empire Strikes First. "Los Angeles Is Burning" was released to radio on April 27, 2004. The song reached number 40 on the Modern Rock Tracks in July 2004.

== Meaning and composition ==
According to bassist Jay Bentley, the lyrics argue that the media is sensationalistic. The music video features men with television cameras replacing their heads firing flames into the animated landscape of Los Angeles. Although the song was written at a time when there was a major wildfire nearby, the late 2003 Cedar Fire, Bentley makes clear that the song was using the fire as a metaphor.

== Music video ==
The music video is shot in cut-out animation and depicts a man in shorts and a track singlet with a Crossbuster (Bad Religion's logo, which features a black cross with a red prohibition sign over it) on it running through a burning, apocalyptic Los Angeles. People with TV news cameras as heads are also shown shooting fire out of their "mouths" (represented by the camera lenses). Frontman Greg Graffin plays a psychotic newsreporter who reads messages like "Panic & Fear Widespread; Retail Up 25%", "Four Horsemen Back In Saddle" and "You are not being brainwashed". Right before the guitar solo, the man shown running through the city burns when the flames catch up to him and the video transitions to the band playing the song among all the chaos in the city, before they burn too. At the end of the video, the entire city goes up in flames moments after Graffin does.

== 7" Picture Disk Track listing ==
Side A
No.	Title	Writer(s)	Length
1.	"Los Angeles is Burning"	Gurewitz	3:23

Side B
No.	Title	Writer(s)	Length
1.	"The Surface of Me"	Graffin	3:01

== Charts ==
Chart (2004)	Peak position
Scotland (OCC)	77
UK Singles (OCC)	67
UK Rock & Metal (OCC)	3
US Alternative Airplay (Billboard)	40
