= Generator (Bad Religion album) =

Studio album by Bad Religion
- Released: March 13, 1992
- Recorded: May 1991
- Studios: Westbeach Recorders, Hollywood, California
- Genres: Hardcore punk, melodic hardcore
- Length: 30:04
- Label: Epitaph
- Producer: Bad Religion

Bad Religion chronology
80–85 (1991)	Generator (1992)	Recipe for Hate (1993)

Singles from Generator
- 1. "Atomic Garden" Released: 1991

Generator is the sixth studio album by the punk rock band Bad Religion. Although the album was completed in the spring of 1991, it was not released until 1992; the band was not happy with the artwork and packaging, and went through several ideas that were eventually scrapped. Generator was the band's first release with drummer Bobby Schayer, who replaced Pete Finestone during the Against the Grain tour.

Generator includes some fan favorites and concert staples, such as, "Generator", "No Direction", "Heaven Is Falling", "Atomic Garden", and "The Answer". The album was promoted with Bad Religion's first music video, which was filmed for the song "Atomic Garden".

== Background and production ==
Following the release of Bad Religion's fifth studio album Against the Grain (1990), drummer Pete Finestone left to focus on his other band the Fishermen. His position was filled by fan Bobby Schayer.

Writing sessions for Generator began around late 1990/early 1991. After Schayer joined in April 1991, the band immediately started work on their follow-up to Against the Grain. With an intended release date of mid-to-late 1991, they recorded it at Westbeach Recorders in Hollywood, California in May of that year.

Generator was recorded almost live in the studio, because, at the time, guitarist Brett Gurewitz had moved Westbeach to larger premises, and for the first time, the entire band could play in the studio at the same time. He stated that it was "time to change" and the band "did it in a different studio, but as far as the songwriting, it was a deliberate effort to try something different".

Generator marked a shift in songwriting-style for the band. Although many songs hold true to their hardcore-punk roots ("Generator", "Tomorrow", "Fertile Crescent"), select tracks suggested the band moving towards a slower, more experimental route ("Two Babies In The Dark", "The Answer"), as well as a darker one ("Atomic Garden"). While not as dark, this experimental period would continue through their next album, 1993's Recipe For Hate.

== Reissue ==
Along with Bad Religion's first five albums (minus Into the Unknown), Epitaph Records released a remastered version of Generator on April 6, 2004, with two exclusive tracks that were taken from the split 7-inch with Noam Chomsky, New World Order: War #1, issued by Maximum Rock'N Roll in 1991. These versions feature Finestone on drums, making it his final recordings with Bad Religion.

== Reception and awards ==
Professional ratings
Review scores
Source	Rating
AllMusic	3/5 stars
Alternative Rock	8/10
Christgau's Consumer Guide	(1-star Honorable Mention)
The Encyclopedia of Popular Music	3/5 stars
Spin Alternative Record Guide	8/10

Author Dave Thompson, in his book Alternative Rock (2000), wrote that the band "offer up complexity and experiment while the slower tempos actually let you hear what the band are singing about — a valid consideration for a band with so much to say."

According to The Bad Religion Page, 100,000 copies of the album were shipped. By April 1992, Generator had sold approximately 85,000 copies, becoming Bad Religion's third best-selling album at the time (their previous album Against the Grain had sold 90,000 copies, while Suffer and No Control sold approximately 88,000 and 80,000 respectively).

In October 2011, the album was ranked number three on Guitar World's top ten list of guitar albums of 1992.

== Track listing ==
No.	Title	Writer(s)	Length
1.	"Generator"	Brett Gurewitz	3:21
2.	"Too Much to Ask"	Greg Graffin	2:45
3.	"No Direction"	Graffin	3:14
4.	"Tomorrow"	Graffin	1:56
5.	"Two Babies in the Dark"	Gurewitz	2:25
6.	"Heaven Is Falling"	Gurewitz	2:04
7.	"Atomic Garden"	Gurewitz	3:10
8.	"The Answer"	Graffin	3:21
9.	"Fertile Crescent"	Graffin	2:08
10.	"Chimaera"	Graffin	2:28
11.	"Only Entertainment"	Graffin	3:12
Total length:			30:04

=== 2004 CD reissue bonus tracks ===
No.	Title	Writer(s)	Length
12.	"Fertile Crescent" (original version)	Graffin	2:18
13.	"Heaven Is Falling" (original version)	Gurewitz	2:18
Total length:			34:40

- Prior to the recording of the album, these tracks were part of the 7-inch split with Noam Chomsky, issued by Maximum Rock 'N' Roll in 1991 as part of an anti-Gulf War benefit.

== Personnel ==
Adapted from the album liner notes, except where noted.

Bad Religion

- Greg Graffin – lead vocals, backing vocals, additional guitar on track 12
- Greg Hetson – guitar
- Brett Gurewitz – guitar, backing vocals, piano on track 7
- Jay Bentley – bass guitar, backing vocals
- Bobby Schayer – drums, percussion

Additional musicians

- Pete Finestone – drums, percussion on tracks 12 and 13

Technical

- Bad Religion – production
- The Legendary Starbolt – engineering
- Donnell Cameron – engineering
- Joe Peccerillo – assistant engineering
- Eddie Schreyer – mastering
- Norman Moore – art direction, design, photography
- The Douglas Brothers – cover photography
- Merlyn Rosenberg – photography
- Gregor Verbinski – photography

== Charts ==
Chart (1992)	Peak position
German Albums (Offizielle Top 100)	49

Chart (2022)	Peak position
US Top Album Sales (Billboard)	87

== See also ==
- List of anti-war songs
