= Sorrow (Bad Religion song) =

Single by Bad Religion

from the album The Process of Belief
- Released: 2001 (as a single)
- Recorded: 2001
- Genre: Punk rock
- Length: 3:21
- Label: Epitaph
- Songwriters: Brett Gurewitz; Greg Graffin
- Producers: Greg Graffin; Brett Gurewitz

Bad Religion singles chronology
"The New America" (2000)	"Sorrow" (2001)	"Broken" (2002)

"Sorrow" is a song written by Brett Gurewitz and Greg Graffin, and performed by Bad Religion. It was the first single to be released from their twelfth studio album, The Process of Belief, which was released in 2002, although the single was first played in the fall of 2001 by the L.A. radio station KROQ. An acoustic version hit radio on June 24, 2008.

== Composition ==
"Sorrow" was inspired by the biblical figure Job, with Gurewitz saying it was "very difficult to account for suffering in the world from a theological perspective". The song opens with a Police-esque ska beat, before switching to the band's typical melodic hardcore sound.

== Charts ==
Chart (2002)	Peak position
US Alternative Airplay (Billboard)	35
