= We're Only Gonna Die =

1982 song by Bad Religion

Song by Bad Religion

from the album How Could Hell Be Any Worse?
- Released: 1982
- Recorded: November/December 1980
- Genre: Hardcore punk
- Length: 2:12
- Label: Epitaph
- Songwriter(s): Greg Graffin
- Producer(s): Bad Religion

"We're Only Gonna Die for Our Arrogance"

Song by Sublime

from the album 40 Oz. to Freedom
- Released: 1992
- Recorded: 1991–1992 at Mambo in Long Beach, California
- Genre: Ska punk
- Length: 3:07
- Label: Skunk Records, Gasoline Alley/MCA
- Songwriter(s): Greg Graffin
- Producer(s): Sublime; Elephant Levitation

"We're Only Gonna Die" is a song penned by frontman Greg Graffin for Bad Religion's debut album, How Could Hell Be Any Worse?, which was released in 1982. It is the album's opening track, as well as the now-out of print 80–85 compilation, which was released in 1991.

The song is often referred to only by the name "Gonna Die". The liner notes to the How Could Hell Be Any Worse? album lists the title as "We're Only Gonna Die from Our Own Arrogance". Graffin occasionally introduces the song with this complete title. The band also called the song "Modern Man" before the release of their 1990 fifth album, Against the Grain, which contained a track by that name.

The lyrics and title show Graffin's early affinity for biology and evolutionary science. They refer to Richard Leakey and Robert Lewin's book Origins, regarding the biological origin and demise of humanity. “To have arrived on this Earth … only to depart it through arrogance, would be the ultimate irony."

The song can also be heard in the movie Glory Daze. It also appears on the soundtrack of the videogame Tony Hawk's American Wasteland.

More than 40 years after its release, "We're Only Gonna Die" is still a fan favorite and remains one of the band's concert staples.

== Cover versions ==
The song was covered by the band Biohazard, who called it "We're Only Gonna Die (From Our Own Arrogance)". Bad Religion and Biohazard played this song live together during a show in the late '90s.

The ska punk band Sublime also covered this song, calling it "We're Only Gonna Die for Our Arrogance". After performing the cover live for several years, a studio version was recorded for their 1992 album, 40 Oz. to Freedom. The song continued to be frequently included in their live set lists throughout their history.

The alternative rock band Tripping Daisy also covered "We're Only Gonna Die", as the closing track on their 1994 live album, Get It On - Live.
