= How Could Hell Be Any Worse? =

Studio album by Bad Religion
- Released: January 19, 1982
- Recorded: October–November 1980 and January 1981
- Studios: Track Record, North Hollywood, California
- Genre: Hardcore punk
- Length: 29:40; 55:24 (2004 re-release)
- Label: Epitaph
- Producer: Bad Religion

Bad Religion chronology
Bad Religion (1981)	How Could Hell Be Any Worse? (1982)	Into the Unknown (1983)

How Could Hell Be Any Worse? is the debut studio album by American punk rock band Bad Religion, released on January 19, 1982, by Epitaph Records. Released almost a year after their self-titled EP, it was financed from the sales of the self titled EP and partly by a $3,000 loan by guitarist Brett Gurewitz's father. Its success surprised the band when it sold 10,000 copies in under a year.

How Could Hell Be Any Worse? was recorded over two time periods at Track Record Studios in North Hollywood, California, during October–November 1980 and again in January 1981. After the original recording sessions, drummer Jay Ziskrout left Bad Religion and was replaced by his friend and the band's roadie Pete Finestone, who was brought in to complete the rest of the album. Though not yet credited as a member of the band, future guitarist Greg Hetson, who was in Circle Jerks during this time, provided a guitar solo on "Part III". How Could Hell Be Any Worse? was also Bad Religion's last album featuring Jay Bentley on bass for six years, until 1988's Suffer.

The front cover photograph was taken by Edward Colver near the Hollywood Bowl, while the back cover featured one of Gustave Dore's illustrations of Dante's Divine Comedy.

== Background and production ==
Bad Religion formed in 1980; their initial line-up consisted of high school students Greg Graffin on vocals, guitarist Brett Gurewitz of Quarks and drummer Jay Ziskrout. They wrote three songs, before Jay Bentley was drafted in on bass. The quartet recorded a demo tape that ended up getting played on local radio station KROQ-FM. A few weeks later, the band made their live debut while supporting Social Distortion. Bad Religion recorded a self-titled EP in late 1981, which was released through their own label Epitaph Records. They pressed 2,000 copies of it, recouping enough to fund the sessions for their debut studio album.

The band recorded most of the album at Track Record Studios in North Hollywood, California over two nights, from October 31 to November 1, 1980; seven songs were recorded on the first night and mixed on the following day. Throughout November of that year, Bad Religion continued to write new material, and Ziskrout soon left the band, replaced by his friend and roadie Pete Finestone. Graffin said regarding Ziskrout's departure: "It was for some really stupid reason. Like 'you guys don't listen to me enough, fuck you, I quit.' He walked out of the rehearsal studio, and left his drums and everything. We're halfway finished with How Could Hell Be Any Worse, and Bad Religion was without a drummer". After "some quick practices" at Graffin's mother's garage, also referred to as The Hellhole, Bad Religion returned to recording How Could Hell Be Any Worse? again in January 1981 and finished the album over the weekend. Author Dave Thompson, in his book Alternative Rock (2000), described the album's sound as "clashing standard punky stop/start songs with a barely disguised debt to '70s hard rock."

== Reception ==
Professional ratings
Review scores
Source	Rating
AllMusic	(original)
AllMusic	(2004 remaster)
Alternative Rock	6/10
Christgau's Record Guide	B

Critical reception to How Could Hell Be Any Worse? has been positive. Johnny Loftus of AllMusic stated that How Could Hell Be Any Worse? is "like cupping your ear against the garage door of their practice space. Greg Graffin's vocal style isn't fully formed here, nor is his lyrical agenda, but the building blocks are significant and affecting, bigger than piles of collapsed cathedrals". Thompson found the album to be partially more melodic than their local hardcore punk contemporaries "but just as fast and furious".

Rage Against the Machine's Zack de la Rocha spoke about Bad Religion to the OC Register during the band's 30-year anniversary in 2010. Speaking about How Could Hell Be Any Worse?, he said: "I remember hearing BR's How Could Hell Be Any Worse? for the first time in 1985, I was fifteen. The first thing I remember is pulling the insert from the sleeve of the record and seeing those drawings from Dante's Inferno, and that red wash over the blurry shot of Los Angeles, and I admit I was scared. A little terrified even. I had no idea what to expect. When the needle hit the record I have to say it was a defining moment for me. The music was darker than most punk records I had heard. It was almost gothic, and there was a genuine sadness to the melodies. Listening to the words I remember being overwhelmed. It wasn't some revelation that god didn't exist ... it was more like an injection of the sad truth. That our condition is the product of the mess of our own making ... and at fifteen that was as scary as the inferno drawings. I wasn't reading Sartre or Nietzsche, and I'm convinced now that if I was it wouldn't have had the same effect. Throughout the record there was very little relief from the sad truths except one: 'there are two things you can do ... one is to turn and fight ... the other's to go headlong into the night.' Truly one of the greatest L.A. bands". De la Rocha also said that the song "Fuck Armageddon...This Is Hell" changed his life.

== Track listing ==
Side one
No.	Title	Writer(s)	Length
1.	"We're Only Gonna Die"	Greg Graffin	2:12
2.	"Latch Key Kids"	Graffin	1:38
3.	"Part III"	Jay Bentley	1:48
4.	"Faith in God"	Graffin	1:50
5.	"Fuck Armageddon...This Is Hell"	Graffin	2:48
6.	"Pity"	Graffin	2:00
7.	"In the Night"	Brett Gurewitz	3:25

Side two
No.	Title	Writer(s)	Length
8.	"Damned to Be Free"	Graffin	1:57
9.	"White Trash (2nd Generation)"	Gurewitz	2:21
10.	"American Dream"	Gurewitz	1:41
11.	"Eat Your Dog"	Graffin	1:04
12.	"Voice of God Is Government"	Bentley	2:54
13.	"Oligarchy"	Gurewitz	1:01
14.	"Doing Time"	Gurewitz	3:00
Total length:			29:40

2004 remaster CD bonus tracks
No.	Title	Writer(s)	Originally appears on	Length
15.	"Bad Religion"	Gurewitz	Bad Religion, 1981	1:49
16.	"Politics"	Graffin	Bad Religion	1:21
17.	"Sensory Overload"	Gurewitz	Bad Religion	1:31
18.	"Slaves"	Graffin	Bad Religion	1:20
19.	"Drastic Actions"	Gurewitz	Bad Religion	2:36
20.	"World War III"	Graffin	Bad Religion	0:54
21.	"Yesterday"	Graffin	Back to the Known, 1984	2:39
22.	"Frogger"	Greg Hetson	Back to the Known	1:19
23.	"Bad Religion"	Gurewitz	Back to the Known	2:10
24.	"Along the Way"	Graffin	Back to the Known	1:36
25.	"New Leaf"	Graffin	Back to the Known	2:53
26.	"Bad Religion" (alternate version)	Gurewitz	Public Service, 1981	1:48
27.	"Slaves" (alternate version)	Graffin	Public Service	1:07
28.	"Drastic Actions" (alternate version)	Gurewitz	Public Service	2:31
Total length:				55:24

== Reissues ==
How Could Hell Be Any Worse? has been reissued many times. It was first reissued in 1988 with a different catalogue number and Epitaph's then-current address. It was released on CD as part of the 1991 compilation 80–85, containing all of the band's material from 1981 to 1985 (except Into the Unknown) in its entirety.

A CD remaster for How Could Hell Be Any Worse? was released in 2004, along with Suffer, No Control, Against the Grain, Generator and a DVD reissue of their long-out of print 1992 live video Along the Way. The remastered version of How Could Hell Be Any Worse? contained the same track listing as 80–85.

== Personnel ==
Adapted from the album liner notes.

Bad Religion

- Greg Graffin – vocals, piano
- Brett Gurewitz – guitars, backing vocals
- Jay Bentley – bass
- Pete Finestone – drums on tracks 1, 3, 4, 6, 7 and 13; timpani

Additional musicians

- Jay Ziskrout – drums on tracks 2, 5, 8–12 and 14
- Greg Hetson – guitar solo on "Part III"

Technical

- Bad Religion – producer
- Jim Mankey – engineer
- Ed Colver – photography
- Fer Youz – photography
