= Daredevils (band) =

American punk band

- Origin: Los Angeles, California, U.S.
- Genres: Punk rock
- Years active: 1994–1996
- Labels: Epitaph
- Past members: Brett Gurewitz; Gore Verbinski; Dean Opseth; Josh Freese

Daredevils was an American punk rock band from Los Angeles, California, that was composed of Brett Gurewitz, Gore Verbinski, Dean Opseth, and Josh Freese. It was formed in 1994 by guitarist Gurewitz after his departure from Bad Religion.

Daredevils released only one single "Hate You", with the B-side "Rules, Hearts", and disbanded. The editor for AllMusic rated it at 3 out 5, unfavorably comparing it to the Daredevil's work as the band Bad Religion, but still considered it to be "solid, mature punk tunes". The characterized Gurewitz's lyrics as "uncharacteristically smug", but not "without his usual penetrating insights".

== Members ==
- Brett Gurewitz – guitar, vocals (see also Bad Religion)
- Gore Verbinski – guitar (see also Little Kings)
- Dean Opseth – bass (see also Medicine)
- Josh Freese – drums (see also A Perfect Circle, Guns N' Roses, The Offspring, The Vandals, Nine Inch Nails)

== Discography ==
=== Singles ===
- "Hate You" (1996)

=== Music videos ===
- "Hate You" (1996)
