= Suffer (album) =

Studio album by Bad Religion
- Released: September 8, 1988
- Recorded: April 1988
- Studios: Westbeach Recorders, Hollywood
- Genres: Hardcore punk; melodic hardcore; skate punk
- Length: 26:07
- Label: Epitaph
- Producer: Bad Religion

Bad Religion chronology
Back to the Known (1985)	Suffer (1988)	No Control (1989)

Suffer is the third studio album by American punk rock band Bad Religion, released on the Californian independent record label Epitaph Records on September 8, 1988. It was the first album that was both released and distributed by the label. Following the release of the EP Back to the Known (1985), Bad Religion went on a temporary hiatus, then reunited with its original members (except drummer Jay Ziskrout) and went to work on their first full-length studio album in five years.

Although Suffer did not chart on the Billboard 200, it has been cited by some critics as one of the most important punk rock albums of all time. A plethora of third-wave punk bands cite Suffer as a major inspiration, including NOFX's Fat Mike, who called it "the record that changed everything." NOFX later referenced the album with their 2001 EP, Surfer.

The songs, "You Are (The Government)", "1000 More Fools", "How Much Is Enough?", "Land of Competition", "Best For You", "Suffer", "What Can You Do?", and "Do What You Want", are all fan favorites, and a few of those are staples of their live show. Up until 2018, the only song from Suffer that was never performed live was "Part IV (The Index Fossil)" which finally received its live premiere that year at the Troubadour in West Hollywood on May 2nd.

== Background and recording ==
After experiencing line-up changes and releasing their second album, Into the Unknown (1983), to commercial failure, Bad Religion and their label Epitaph Records called it quits. Vocalist Greg Graffin and drummer Pete Finestone reformed the band with guitarist Greg Hetson of Circle Jerks, who had guested on their debut album How Could Hell Be Any Worse? (1982), and bassist Tim Gallegos of Wasted Youth. They released the Back to the Known (1985) EP, and after a year of constant touring, Gallegos left and was replaced by former Bad Religion member Jay Bentley, who had also played in Wasted Youth. Some months later, former Bad Religion guitarist Brett Gurewitz, who was recovering from drug problems, filled in for Hetson during one show and eventually re-joined the band.

By 1987, Gurewitz struggled to find some kind of employment. After taking some vocational courses and a raft of odd jobs, he became a studio engineer and owner of a recording studio, Westbeach Recorders. Gurewitz noted, "I really enjoyed, still enjoy, being a recording engineer, but I had a terrible time trying to make any money. And my hours were horrible. I just knew I wanted to be in music. Then, in 1987, Bad Religion said, 'Hey man, why don't we get the group back together?". After Bad Religion finally reunited, they began writing new material and entered Westbeach Recorders in April 1988 to record their next album. According to Gurewitz, the album took eight days for the band to record and mix.

During recording sessions, the band even demoed a revamped version of "Fuck Armageddon...This Is Hell", a track previously released on How Could Hell Be Any Worse?. Whether they intended to include the song on Suffer is unknown and most unlikely.

Members of L7 played on the record. Donita Sparks and Suzi Gardner played guitar on "Best for You" and Jennifer Finch sang back-up vocals on "Part II (The Numbers Game)". Epitaph Records was re-started to release the self-titled debut album from L7, prior to issuing Suffer that same year.

== Reception and legacy ==
Professional ratings
Review scores
Source	Rating
AllMusic	4/5 stars
Alternative Rock	7/10
Christgau's Record Guide	B
The Rolling Stone Album Guide	3/5 stars
Spin Alternative Record Guide	7/10

The album received critical acclaim. Robert Christgau gave the album a "B" saying; "This comeback is hailed as a hardcore milestone, probably because it's coherent. Relatively sane as their bitter analysis is—and I mean relative to both hardcore despair and mainstream complacency—it sounds a little pat. As if they're already a little slow for speedrock and don't want to upset the apple cart." Author Dave Thompson, in his book Alternative Rock (2000), wrote: "Fast, furious, edgy, insightful lyrics about the state of the world... it all started here. A hint of harmonies, a mass of melodies, Suffer marks the true dawn of the band's slow rise to stardom."

In the lead up to the release of their next album, No Control (1989), Suffer had sold 4,000 copies. The album also received acclaim by the following magazines:

- Alternative Press (3/02, p. 96) – Included in AP's "Essential Punk Influences '02 Style" – "...Their definitive album....they'd never eclipse this fireball of creative energy."
- Kerrang! (p. 51) – "[With] sonorous, soaring vocal hooks. The melding of power and melody proved a statement of absolute power."

In a fan poll, "Do What You Want" was cited as one of the best Bad Religion songs of all time, along with "American Jesus" and "Along the Way." Rancid's Tim Armstrong has said that "What Can You Do?" is his favorite Bad Religion track.

The album was named the 99th most influential rock album of all time by Kerrang!. It placed at No. 6 on LA Weekly's "Top 20 Punk Albums in History".

To celebrate its 250th issue, German music magazine Visions asked 250 famous musicians across all genres of rock music to review the one album that musically influenced them the most. Both Fat Mike of NOFX and Chuck Ragan of Hot Water Music chose Suffer.

== Artwork ==
The album cover features a drawing of a teenager on fire wearing a T-shirt with Bad Religion's crossbuster logo, designed by Jerry Mahoney, on the back. The person on the cover has been taken by the band as a mascot; "Boy on Fire" is the name and he can also be seen on Bad Religion accessories, including T-shirts. NOFX paid homage to the cover art on its Surfer EP, which depicts a surfer on fire wearing a wetsuit with NOFX's "prohibited FX" symbol on the back, at a beach. It was painted by Mark deSalvo.

== Accolades ==
Publication	Country	Accolade	Year	Rank
Soundi	Finland	The 50 Best Albums of All Time + Top 10 by Decade	1995	35
Rock Hard	Germany	Top 300 Albums	2001	222

== Track listing ==
Side one
No.	Title	Writer(s)	Length
1.	"You Are (The Government)"	Greg Graffin	1:21
2.	"1000 More Fools"	Brett Gurewitz	1:34
3.	"How Much Is Enough?"	Gurewitz	1:22
4.	"When?"	Graffin	1:39
5.	"Give You Nothing"	Graffin, Gurewitz	2:02
6.	"Land of Competition"	Graffin	2:04
7.	"Forbidden Beat"	Graffin, Gurewitz	1:57
8.	"Best for You"	Graffin	1:55

Side two
No.	Title	Writer(s)	Length
1.	"Suffer"	Graffin, Gurewitz	1:47
2.	"Delirium of Disorder"	Gurewitz	1:39
3.	"Part II (The Numbers Game)"	Gurewitz	1:41
4.	"What Can You Do?"	Graffin	2:44
5.	"Do What You Want"	Gurewitz	1:07
6.	"Part IV (The Index Fossil)"	Graffin	2:04
7.	"Pessimistic Lines"	Graffin	1:10
Total length:			26:07

== Release history ==
Label	Release date	Notes
Epitaph Records	September 8, 1988	On the CD version, the inside cover features an image of a groupshot of the band behind CBGB. On the vinyl version, the same image appears on the back cover. The inside cover also features the lyrics written on the wall of an empty room where Greg Hetson's SG is towards the doorway while a pair of Converse and a leather jacket are hanging on the door knob. The head of a Rickenbacker 4001 (which belonged to Jay Bentley) also emerges from the hole in the wall. Jay once said that the empty room used to be his bedroom at his mother's house. Also on the CD version, the back cover features the credits and the band members are listed next to the groupshot the band.
Epitaph Records	April 6, 2004	Remastered along with How Could Hell Be Any Worse?, No Control, Against the Grain and Generator.

== Personnel ==
Adapted from the album liner notes, except where noted.

Bad Religion

- Greg Graffin – lead vocals, backing vocals
- Brett Gurewitz – guitar, backing vocals
- Greg Hetson – guitar
- Jay Bentley – bass guitar, backing vocals
- Pete Finestone – drums

Additional musicians

- Donita Sparks – additional guitar on "Best for You"
- Suzi Gardner – additional guitar on "Best for You"
- Jennifer Finch – back-up vocals on "Part II (The Numbers Game)"

Technical

- Bad Religion – producer
- Donnell Cameron – engineer
- Legendary Starbolt – engineer
- Jerry Mahoney – artwork

== Charts ==
Chart performance for Suffer
Chart (2025)	Peak position
Croatian International Albums (HDU)	17
