= Bad Religion =

American punk rock band

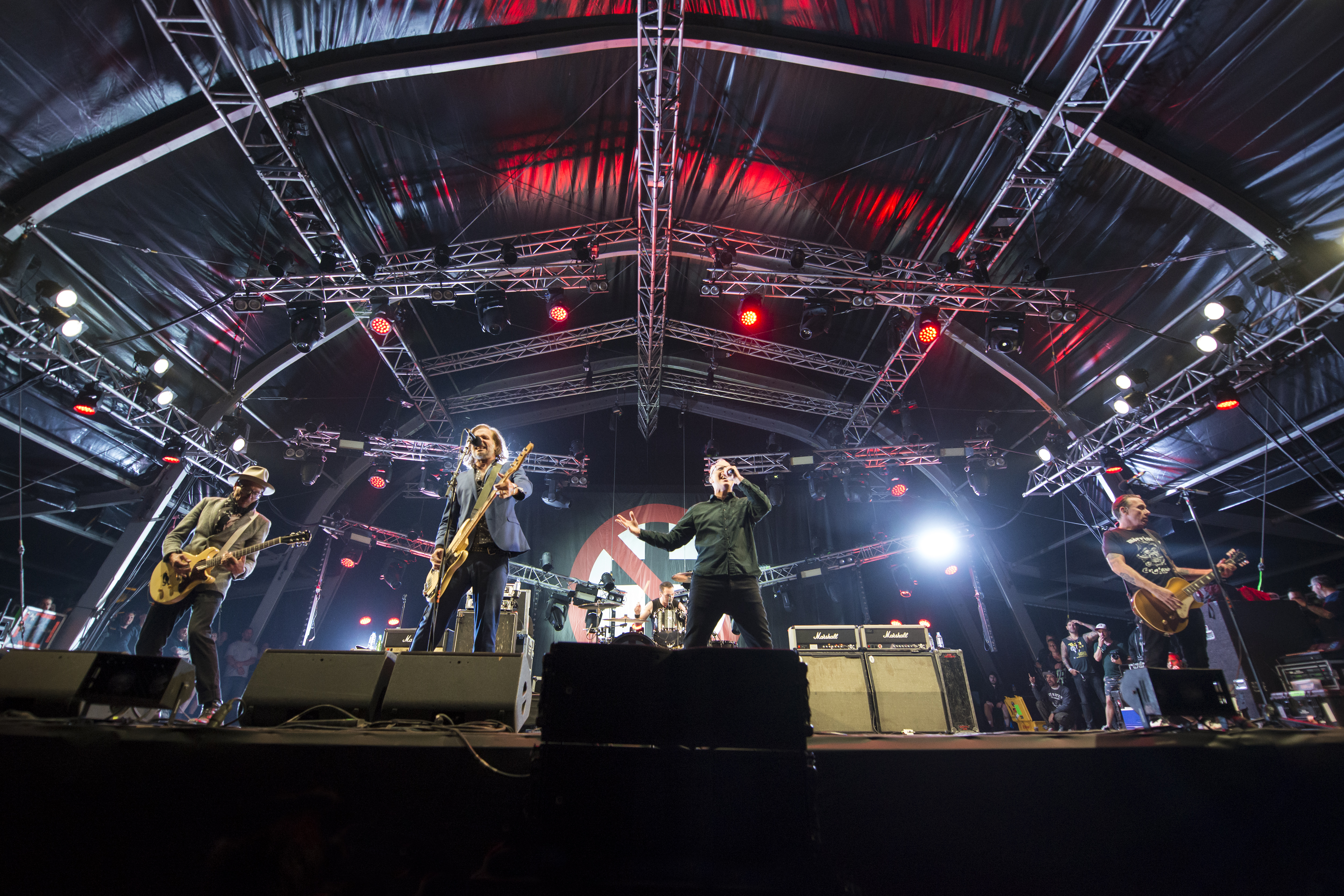
- Bad Religion performing at Hellfest in 2018. From left: Dimkich, Bentley, Miller, Graffin, and Baker.

Background information
- Origin: Los Angeles, California, U.S.
- Genres: Melodic hardcore; punk rock; skate punk; hardcore punk
- Works: Discography
- Years active: 1980–present
- Labels: Epitaph; Atlantic; Epic; Sympathy for the Record Industry
- Members: Greg Graffin; Brett Gurewitz; Jay Bentley; Brian Baker; Mike Dimkich; Jamie Miller
- Past members: Jay Ziskrout; Pete Finestone; Paul Dedona; Davy Goldman; Greg Hetson; Tim Gallegos; John Albert; Lucky Lehrer; Bobby Schayer; Brooks Wackerman
- Website: badreligion.com

Bad Religion is an American punk rock band, formed in Los Angeles, California, in 1980. The band's lyrics cover topics related to religion, politics, society, the media and science. Musically, they are noted for their melodic sensibilities and extensive use of three-part vocal harmonies. The band has experienced multiple lineup changes, with singer Greg Graffin being the band's only constant member, though fellow founding members Jay Bentley and Brett Gurewitz have also been with the band for most of their history while guitarist Brian Baker has been a member of the group since 1994. Guitarist Mike Dimkich and drummer Jamie Miller have been members of the band since 2013 and 2015 respectively. To date, Bad Religion has released seventeen studio albums, two live albums, three compilation albums, three EPs, and two live DVDs. They are considered to be one of the best-selling punk rock acts of all time, having sold over five million albums worldwide.

After gaining a large underground following and critical praise through their releases on Gurewitz's label Epitaph in the 1980s and early 1990s, Bad Religion experienced mainstream success after signing to the major-label Atlantic in 1993. The band pioneered the punk rock revival movement of the 1990s, establishing a formula for California-based punk bands such as Green Day and Epitaph-signed acts the Offspring, NOFX and Rancid. They are also cited as an inspiration or influence on the 1990s and 2000s pop punk, skate punk, post-hardcore, screamo and emo scenes.

Atlantic reissued the previously released-on-Epitaph album, Recipe for Hate (1993), which became commercially successful, as did its 1994 follow-up Stranger than Fiction. Stranger than Fiction included some of Bad Religion's well-known hits, including "Infected", "Stranger than Fiction", and the re-recorded version of "21st Century (Digital Boy)" (the latter of which its original version appeared four years earlier on Against the Grain); the album was later certified gold in both the United States and Canada. Shortly before the release of Stranger than Fiction, Gurewitz left Bad Religion to run his label Epitaph on a full-time basis, and was replaced by Brian Baker. The band's success had slowly dwindled by the late 1990s, and, after three more albums, they were dropped from Atlantic in 2001; this resulted in Bad Religion returning to Epitaph and Gurewitz rejoining the band. Since then, they have undergone a resurgence in popularity, with "Sorrow", "Los Angeles Is Burning", and "The Devil in Stitches" becoming Top 40 hits on the US charts while their sixteenth studio album, True North (2013), became Bad Religion's first album to crack the top 20 on the Billboard 200 chart where it peaked at number 19. The band's seventeenth studio album, Age of Unreason, was released on May 3, 2019.

== History ==
=== Formation and early recordings (1980–1983) ===
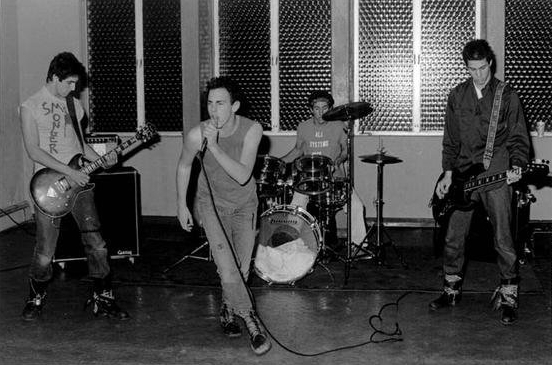
Bad Religion in 1980

Bad Religion was formed in Los Angeles, California, in 1980 by high school students Greg Graffin, Jay Bentley, Jay Ziskrout, and Brett Gurewitz. Their first public performance was playing six or eight songs at a Fullerton, California, or Santa Ana, California, warehouse opening for Social Distortion. Graffin has said that the name "Bad Religion" came about when the then-adolescent members of the band wanted to "piss people off".

In 1981, the band released their initial eponymous six-song EP as a 7" record on the newly formed label, Epitaph Records, which was and continues to be managed and owned by Gurewitz. Also in 1981, the band began recording their first full-length album, How Could Hell Be Any Worse? During the recording of this album, drummer Jay Ziskrout quit the band and was replaced by Pete Finestone. Released in 1982, How Could Hell Be Any Worse? was also distributed by the band under the Epitaph label and sold roughly 12,000 copies.

=== Into the Unknown, Back to the Known and hiatus (1983–1985) ===
In 1983, the band released Into the Unknown, a keyboard-driven progressive hard rock album with a slightly slower pace. Almost all of the albums the band produced were sold out of the warehouse they were housed in without the band's knowledge, after which this album went out of print. This incident, as well as band members' increasingly divergent personal lives, led to the band's temporary dissolution shortly after the album's release.

Soon after, Graffin reassembled Bad Religion with Circle Jerks guitarist Greg Hetson replacing Gurewitz, who had gone into rehab for his drug problem. Bad Religion returned to a somewhat mellower, rock and roll version of their original sound with the Back to the Known EP. Eventually the band split toward the middle of 1985.

=== Reunion, Suffer, No Control, Against the Grain and Generator (1986–1992) ===
Bad Religion slowly reformed in 1986 out of the Back to the Known line-up when Graffin called Bentley and asked him to return. Bentley's response was tentative, but after being assured that the setlist consisted mostly of tracks from How Could Hell Be Any Worse?, he agreed to return for one show, and ended up staying on because he had so much fun. A freshly rehabilitated Gurewitz was eventually convinced to come back aboard, and with Pete Finestone returning on drums and Greg Hetson on second guitar; Bad Religion was back. This lineup recorded the band's third album, Suffer, which was released in 1988. The album received positive reviews in the independent music press and was voted Best Album of the Year by publications such as Trust, Maximum Rocknroll and Flipside.

During the Suffer tour in 1988, Bad Religion began writing new material. In early 1989, while the band was on break from touring, they commenced work on their next album, and entered the Westbeach Recorders studio in June of that year to record it. The resulting album, No Control, was released in November 1989, and was Bad Religion's best-selling album at the time, eventually selling more than 80,000 copies.

Bad Religion's hardcore punk style continued with their next album, Against the Grain, which was released in 1990. While the album still did not break the band into mainstream audiences, it was the first 100,000 seller, and showed how quickly they were growing. "21st Century (Digital Boy)", one of the tracks off the album, is generally regarded as the band's most well-known song, and has been played at almost every live show.

Drummer Pete Finestone left Bad Religion again in April 1991 to focus on his other band, the Fishermen, which had signed with a major label, and Bobby Schayer joined the band as his replacement. In May 1991, Bad Religion entered the Westbeach Recorders studio to begin recording material for their sixth studio album, Generator, which was not released until March 1992. The album was recorded almost live in the studio, because, at the time, Gurewitz had moved Westbeach to larger premises, and for the first time, the entire band could play in the studio at the same time. He stated that it was "time to change" and the band "did it in a different studio, but as far as the songwriting, it was a deliberate effort to try something different." To accompany the album, Bad Religion filmed their first music video "Atomic Garden", which was also their first song to be released as a single.

To coincide with the band's success, Bad Religion released a compilation album, 80–85, in 1991. It is a repackaging of their debut album, How Could Hell Be Any Worse?, their two EPs, Bad Religion and Back to the Known and the band's three track contributions to the Public Service EP. This compilation did not include Into the Unknown. 80–85 is now out of print and has been replaced by the 2004 re-issued version of How Could Hell Be Any Worse? with the same track listings.

=== Mainstream success and departure of Gurewitz (1993–1995) ===
With alternative rock and grunge breaking into the mainstream, Bad Religion signed to Atlantic Records in 1993 and quickly re-released their seventh full-length studio album Recipe for Hate on the label that same year. Despite receiving mixed reviews from music critics, the album finally broke Bad Religion into mainstream audiences and got their highest U.S. chart position to date, debuting at No. 14 on Billboard's Heatseekers chart, with "American Jesus" and "Struck a Nerve" in particular becoming major rock radio hits at their time. During their Recipe for Hate Tour, the band would support several opening acts, including then Lookout Records-signed punk band Green Day.

Recipe for Hate was followed up by Bad Religion's eighth studio album Stranger Than Fiction. The album met high critical reception upon its release in September 1994, and was their most successful album at the time, scoring such hits as "Stranger Than Fiction", "Infected", and a re-recording of "21st Century (Digital Boy)", which was originally released on Against the Grain. The band also recorded the song "Leaders and Followers" (which later appeared as a bonus track on the Japanese version of Stranger Than Fiction) for the soundtrack for the Kevin Smith film, Clerks. The album was Bad Religion's first to enter the Billboard 200; the release peaked at number 87, and was awarded gold certification on March 4, 1998, for sales of over half a million copies. With the success of that album, Bad Religion became a key member of the 1990s commercial punk rock explosion, alongside Green Day and fellow Epitaph bands such as the Offspring, Rancid, and NOFX.

Gurewitz left the band right before the release of Stranger Than Fiction. He officially cited the reason for his departure as the increasing amount of time he was needed at Epitaph as the Offspring (who had just released Smash to unexpected success and acclaim) became one of the biggest bands of the mid-1990s. Gurewitz, along with many fans, accused the band of selling out for leaving Epitaph to seek greater financial success. As tensions increased, Graffin would sing alternate lyrics during concerts, such as, "I want to know where Brett gets his crack" or "I want to know why Gurewitz cracked", on the song "Stranger Than Fiction". These barbs referred to Gurewitz's struggles with crack, heroin, and other addictions which plagued him for years. Brett discussed his drug use in an interview on the band's Suffer Tour documentary, Along the Way, and claimed that he was clean and sober. In response, Gurewitz recorded a song with his new band, the Daredevils, titled "Hate You".

Gurewitz was replaced as guitarist by Brian Baker, a former member of the bands Minor Threat, Dag Nasty, and Junkyard; Baker declined a spot with R.E.M. to join Bad Religion. With Gurewitz gone, Graffin became Bad Religion's primary songwriter (songwriting duties were originally split between the two).

=== Post-Gurewitz period, departure of Bobby Schayer (1996–2000) ===
Bad Religion continued touring and recording without Brett Gurewitz, releasing three more albums for Atlantic, starting with The Gray Race (1996), produced by former Cars frontman Ric Ocasek. Despite never garnering the amount of attention that Stranger Than Fiction received, it scored Bad Religion a minor U.S. radio hit with the song, "A Walk", as well as the European release of "Punk Rock Song".

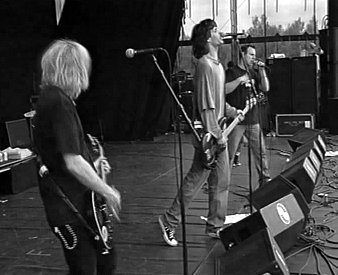
Brian Baker (left) with Bad Religion live in the Netherlands, 1995

In 1998, Bad Religion released their tenth full-length album, No Substance, produced by Alex Perialas, Ronnie Kimball, and the band themselves. Although the album was anticipated by music critics and fans alike as a result of the band's previous worldwide successes with Stranger Than Fiction and The Gray Race, it was given mixed reviews by both critics and fans. Following the release of No Substance, the band embarked on a year-long tour.

In 1999, Gurewitz reunited with Graffin to co-write a song together called, "Believe It", which would appear on their next album, The New America (2000). For this new album, Todd Rundgren, an early musical inspiration for Graffin, was brought in to produce. "Todd was kind of an underground sensation back in 1974. Here's a guy who was making pop music but in a way that you wouldn't hear on the radio. So much of my early musical identity was wrapped up in the way he conducted himself." In the summer of 2000, they set out on a successful 3-month U.S. arena tour opening for Blink-182. Interest in recording the record waned due to Rundgren's poor attitude. Jay Bentley reflects on this by saying, "I didn't feel we were going anywhere and so did Greg. Todd didn't like Greg and that made Greg so mad! He met his idol, and he was a jerk! I don't think Todd gave a shit about anything." However, Graffin later writes in his book, "Anarchy Evolution", that, although Rundgren was difficult to work with, he and Graffin remain friends to this day. Meanwhile, Bobby Schayer left the band following a serious shoulder injury and was replaced by Brooks Wackerman (Suicidal Tendencies).

=== Return to Epitaph and reunion with Gurewitz (2001–2004) ===
In 2001, Bad Religion departed from Atlantic Records. They returned to Epitaph, and Brett Gurewitz rejoined the band. The expanded six-piece line-up then recorded and released The Process of Belief (2002). Graffin stated, "There was a little bit of disappointment on my part when he left the band, but we never had any serious acrimony between the two of us. I can't say the same for the rest of the band. But he and I, being the songwriters from way back, we really wanted to try again."

Their next album, The Empire Strikes First, was released in June 2004. Like The Process of Belief, it was widely regarded by fans as a return to the faster punk-style songwriting that some felt was less prominent in the band's music during their time on Atlantic.

In April 2004, the band also re-released digitally-remastered versions of all of their first six studio albums on Epitaph Records (except Into the Unknown). The How Could Hell Be Any Worse? reissue, though reclaiming the original title of the band's debut LP, contained all of the same material as the previously issued 80–85 compilation, including their first EP, the Public Service EP (with different versions of the songs Bad Religion, Slaves, and Drastic Actions than the self-titled EP) and the "Back to the Known" EP. To coincide with the reissues, they also released their long out-of-print live VHS, Along the Way, on DVD for the first time. Recipe for Hate, though, could not be re-issued, even though it was originally released on Epitaph, due to the fact that it had already been re-issued through Atlantic, and so problems with rights ownership made a reissue unlikely.

=== New Maps of Hell (2005–2008) ===
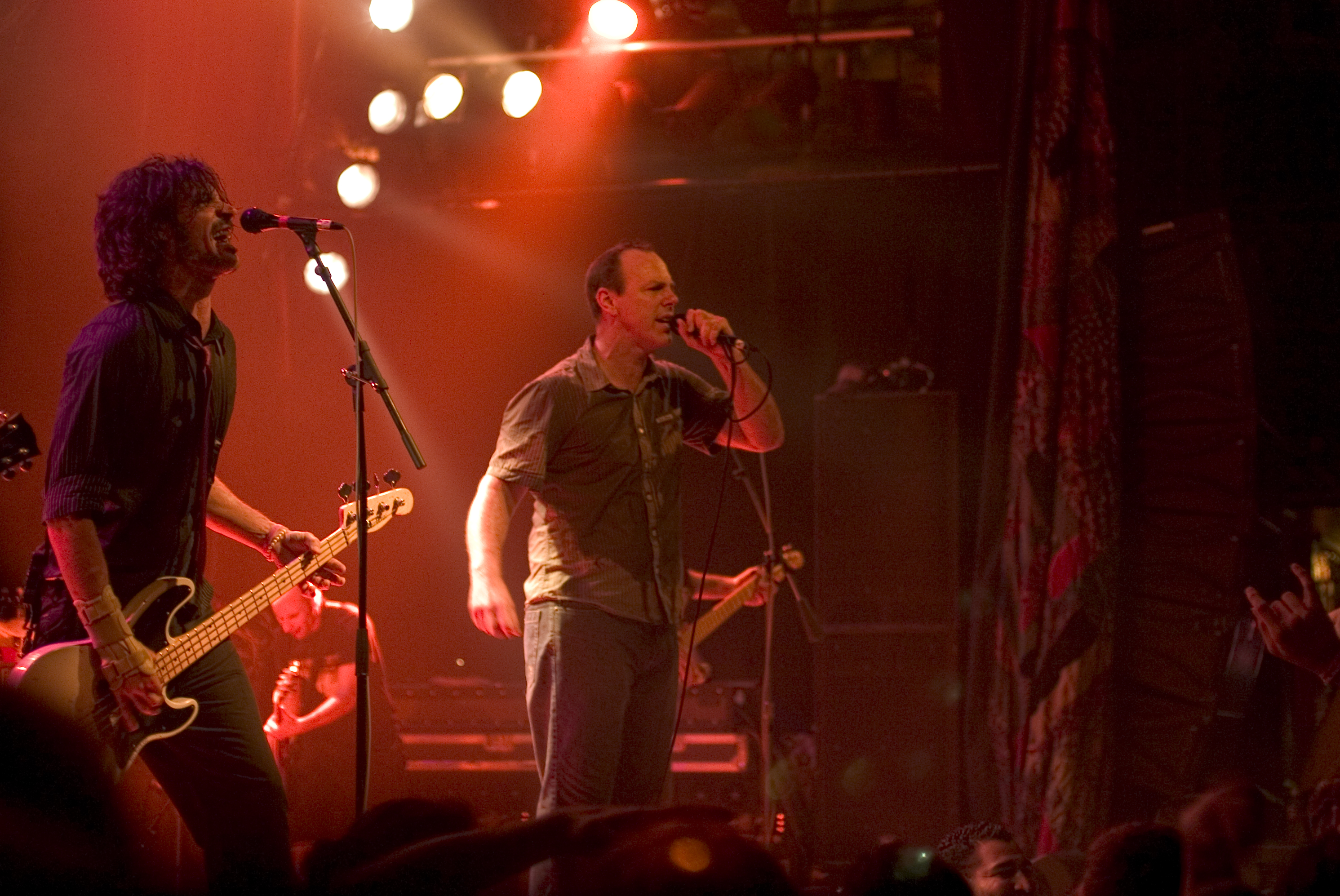
Bentley (left) and Graffin (right) with Bad Religion live in the House of Blues, 2005

On March 7, 2006, a live DVD, Live at the Palladium, was released. This DVD featured a live show performed in late 2004 at the Hollywood Palladium as well as extensive interviews, several music videos, and a photo gallery. During one of the interview segments, guitarist Brett Gurewitz said the band's next album would be a double-length release, but this turned out to not be the case.

Greg Graffin released his second solo album, Cold as the Clay, on July 11, 2006.

Bad Religion's fourteenth studio album, New Maps of Hell, was released on July 10, 2007. On June 29 of that year (Greg Hetson's 46th birthday), Epitaph Records started selling New Maps of Hell at the Warped Tour in Pomona, California. The album was a commercial success and spawned three hit singles: "Honest Goodbye", "Heroes and Martyrs", and "New Dark Ages". As a result, New Maps of Hell reached number 35 on the Billboard 200, marking Bad Religion's highest-ever chart position. The band joined the 2007 Warped Tour to support the album.

Hetson formed a supergroup band called Black President, consisting of Charlie Paulson (from Goldfinger), Jason Christopher, Wade Youman (both from Unwritten Law), and Christian Martucci (from Dee Dee Ramone).

In early March 2008, Bad Religion played several night residences at House of Blues venues in Southern California as well as Las Vegas. They performed four European festival appearances in May and June.

On July 8, 2008, Bad Religion released their first-ever deluxe edition CD, a reissue of the then-current album, New Maps of Hell. The deluxe version included the original 16-song CD along with seven new acoustic tracks recorded by Graffin (vocals/guitars) and Gurewitz (guitars/back vocals). Three of the acoustic songs were new, written specifically for this release, while the other four tracks were acoustic versions of existing Bad Religion songs. The release also included a DVD with an hour-long live performance, music videos, and behind-the-scenes footage.

=== 30 Years Live and The Dissent of Man (2009–2010) ===
In June 2008, Jay Bentley said in an interview at the Pinkpop Festival in Landgraaf, Netherlands, that Gurewitz had already begun writing new material for the next Bad Religion album. He stated that the band was planning to return to the studio to start work on the follow-up to New Maps of Hell, planned for a June 2009 release, after Graffin teaches UCLA. However, according to a December 2008 report on the fan site, "The Bad Religion Page", Bentley revealed that due to Bad Religion's upcoming touring commitments for 2009, the band would not have a chance to record their new album until around the end of the year, for an expected 2010 release date.

In August 2009, guitarist Brett Gurewitz sent an email to a fan site mentioning he was writing new material for the next Bad Religion album.

In December 2009, Bentley revealed to the fan site that the band was expected to go into the studio on April 26, 2010, to start recording their new album. He stated that a few songs for the album had been written and, "It feels like the songwriting is picking up momentum. Baker said he was going to drive up to Graffin's, and Brooks and I are going to do some demos with Brett, so we have a pretty good jump." According to Brett's Twitter, Bad Religion is aiming for a fall release of the new album. In January 2010, Bentley revealed that Bad Religion would record their new album at a studio in Pasadena, California, with Joe Barresi, who engineered 2004's The Empire Strikes First and produced its 2007 follow-up, New Maps of Hell. Despite the statement made by Bentley about entering the studio in April, he noted that the recording date was now May 1.

In March and April 2010, to commemorate their 30th anniversary, Bad Religion toured Southern California's and Nevada's House of Blues locations, playing 30 Shows in 30 Nights with a 30-song set each night. At the House of Blues concert in Anaheim, California, on March 17, 2010, the band debuted a new song called "Resist-Stance" from their upcoming album. To coincide with the tour, Bad Religion announced a live album, entitled 30 Years Live, which was released as a free download for those who had signed up to the mailing list at Bad Religion's website. It consists of songs recorded during their House of Blues tour. It also included some new songs from their 15th studio album, before the new album was released. 30 Years Live was mixed by Mike Fraser and was released on May 18, 2010.

On May 1, 2010, Brett posted an update on his Twitter saying, "Threw me a going away [to the studio] party and all my friends hung with me tonight – thx everybody, I love you guys." This adds fuel to the possibility of the band's new album being recorded the first week of May. On May 12, 2010 (which happened to be Brett's 48th birthday), bassist Jay Bentley posted an update on their Facebook page regarding the recording process of the album: "First week of recording at Joe's house of compression and Brooks gets the medal for superasskicking. Brian has finished 14 basics ... a couple more to go. I started getting some good bass sounds late, late last night, the liver wins the shootout again. Brett is playing late night tracks on his birthday, some way to celebrate! happy birthday bg! quote of the day; BG "what percentage of the sound is coming from the snakeskin?". haha ... working of album titles and ideas today. It's all coming together. Joe says the corn flavored kit kats are gross, but the wasabi ones are quite delicious ... get back to work. Work work work. Will send photo's soon."

In June 2010, the fan site reported that the new album would be released on September 28, 2010. Jay (who goes by jabberwock on the Bad Religion Page) mentioned on the site's message board that Bad Religion had finished recording their new album and was mixing it. In an interview at the Azkena Rock Festival on June 26, 2010, the band members announced that the new album would be called The Dissent of Man. The Dissent of Man was released on September 28, 2010. The album debuted at No. 35 on the Billboard 200 chart and at No. 6 on the Billboard Independent Albums chart. On August 30, 2010, the album version of the song, "The Resist Stance", was released on Bad Religion's MySpace page. The song was also made available for streaming on the page a week before the album's release. The band had been touring throughout 2011 to support the album.

On October 18, 2010, Bad Religion released a vinyl box set of all their albums that is limited to 3000 copies, including their 1983 album, Into the Unknown, which had been out of print for over 25 years.

=== True North (2011–2013) ===
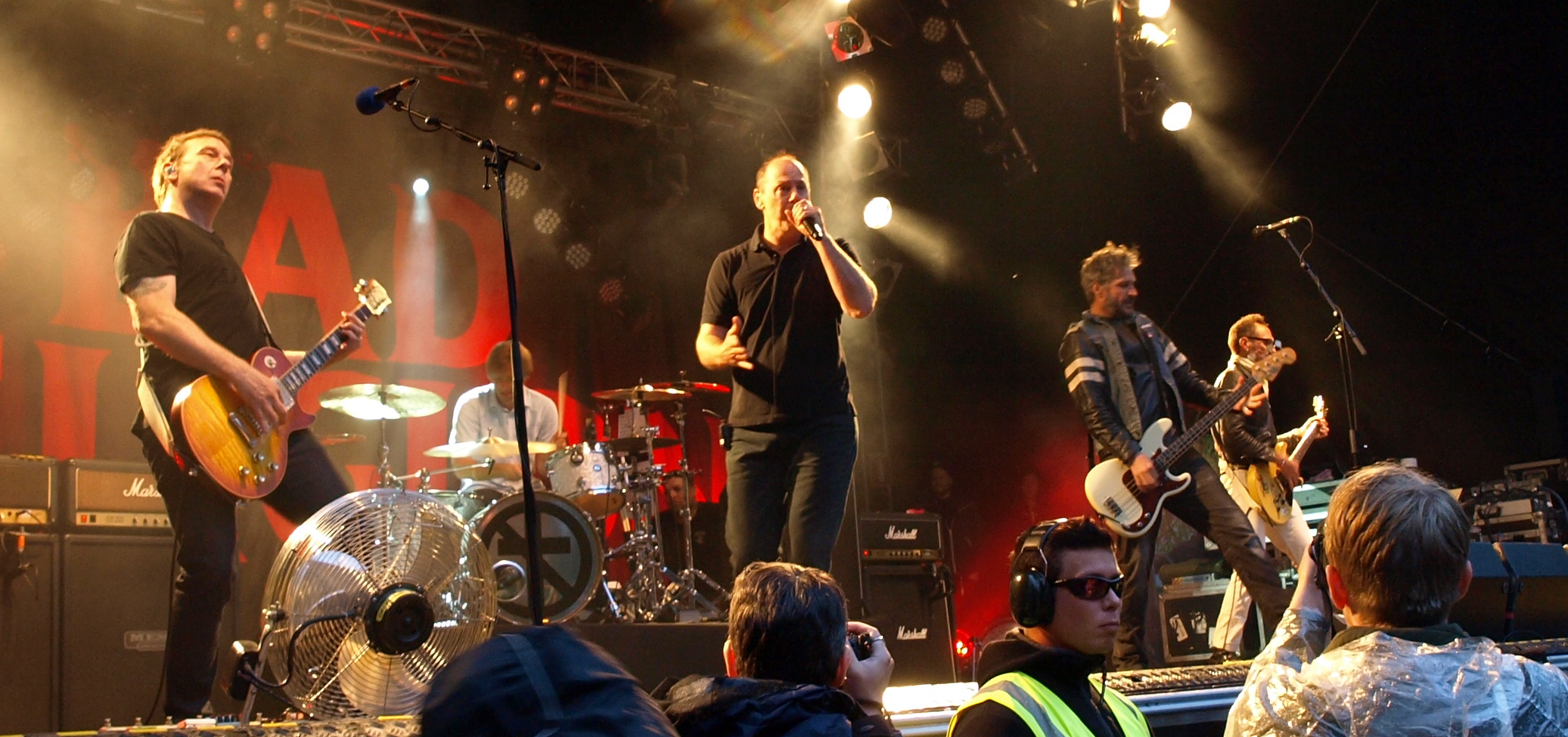
Bad Religion performing in 2013

In an April 2011 interview with The Washington Examiner, guitarist Brian Baker was asked if Bad Religion was going to make another album after The Dissent of Man. His response was, "It's all very punk [attitude] just like it's always been. We will record when we have enough songs. For us, it just kind of happens." During the Boston show on April 29, 2011, frontman Greg Graffin said, "After this year you probably won't be seeing much more of us. We're going to try one more album and then all join the navy, do honest work", hinting at a possible split or hiatus. Bassist Jay Bentley mentioned an early 2012 timeframe for going back into the studio in an interview at Live 105's BFD festival, which took place the day after the Weenie Roast. In February 2012, it was reported that Brett had written two songs for the album.

On June 25, 2011, Bad Religion performed a live set for "Guitar Center Sessions" on DirecTV. The episode included an interview with program host, Nic Harcourt.

According to a May 2012 interview with Pennywise guitarist Fletcher Dragge, Brett is writing a "fast" Bad Religion album. He also said that Pennywise's then-new album, All or Nothing, inspired Brett to write a sequel to the band's 1989 album, No Control.

On June 4, 2012, Jay Bentley told the Bad Religion fan site, "The Bad Religion Page", that they were expected to begin recording their new album in July and August. He also stated that Brett and Joe Barresi are going to produce it. On July 23, the band uploaded a picture to Bad Religion's Facebook page of all the members (except Greg Hetson, who was taking the picture) in the studio with the caption, "here we go again", indicating that work on their sixteenth studio album had begun. On August 22, Brett Gurewitz tweeted that they were mixing the album, and, a month later, he tweeted that the band was finishing it. Greg Graffin later stated that the album was supposed to be out by Christmas. "Fuck You" was the album's lead single and released on iTunes on November 6, which happened to be Greg Graffin's 48th birthday.

On November 5, 2012 (Bad Religion Day), it was announced that Bad Religion's sixteenth studio album, True North, would be released on January 22, 2013. On that same day, they premiered the new single "Fuck You". True North has received mostly positive reviews and managed to reach number 18 on the Billboard 200 albums chart, marking Bad Religion's first ever top-20 album and highest ever peak on that chart in their entire 34-year career.

=== Departures of Hetson and Wackerman, and Christmas Songs (2013–2017) ===
Bad Religion played a few shows as a four-piece (without Greg Hetson and Brett Gurewitz) in mid April - May 2013—starting with their appearance at "That Damn Show" in Mesa, AZ, on April 20, including some high profile shows such as Groezrock in Belgium—leading fans to speculate over Greg Hetson's continued involvement in the band.

On May 7, 2013, Jay Bentley issued a statement to the fan site, which read, "Greg Hetson is dealing with some personal issues, if he wishes to make a statement we will support that, if he chooses not to we will support that. Mike Dimkich is indeed helping us out right now, and we are genuinely appreciative. Right now we are just looking forward and getting ready to play our shows." The reason Hetson had not been touring with Bad Religion was likely due to the divorce of his second wife Alia. On January 11, 2014, Bentley confirmed on "thebrpage.net" that Dimkich is a permanent member of the band. A few days later, Download Festival's official website uploaded a photograph of the new lineup (without Brett Gurewitz).

Later, in 2022, Hetson appeared on the podcast Fat Mike's Fat Mic stating he was let go due to his admitted addiction to painkillers and the behavior he exhibited due to this addiction.

On September 10, 2013, it was announced that Bad Religion would be releasing their first Christmas album, titled Christmas Songs, on October 29, 2013. It was their first album to not feature Greg Hetson since 1983's Into the Unknown.

In a November 2013 interview, guitarist Brett Gurewitz stated that Bad Religion would start writing their seventeenth studio album in 2014, and guitarist Brian Baker said that he hoped Bad Religion would start recording the album in the fall of 2015. However, in a September 2015 interview, frontman Greg Graffin stated that he had been working on his first solo album since 2006's Cold as the Clay, and that the band would begin writing their new album after the release of his third solo album, Millport, so a new Bad Religion album would not be released until around late 2016. Baker said, however, that the new album would not be released until 2017. Asked in a March 2017 interview about the follow-up to True North, Graffin said, "It's one of the great challenges as artist is to maintain the tradition of his or her prior work. That's hard to do. It normally takes (Bad Religion) two years to put out an album. Why has it taken us four years to release an album after True North? Well, True North was such a great album — and we owe it to our fans to take it seriously as a great album — that to do another one is going to take a lot more work." Millport was eventually released on March 10, 2017.

From July to September 2014, Bad Religion embarked on the Summer Nationals Tour with Pennywise; their former labelmates the Offspring, the Vandals, Stiff Little Fingers, and Naked Raygun supported them on selected dates.

On October 27, 2015, drummer Brooks Wackerman officially left the band in order to pursue other projects, joining Avenged Sevenfold a week later. He was replaced by Jamie Miller (...And You Will Know Us by the Trail of Dead, Souls at Zero and Snot).

=== Age of Unreason and possible follow-up album (2018–present) ===
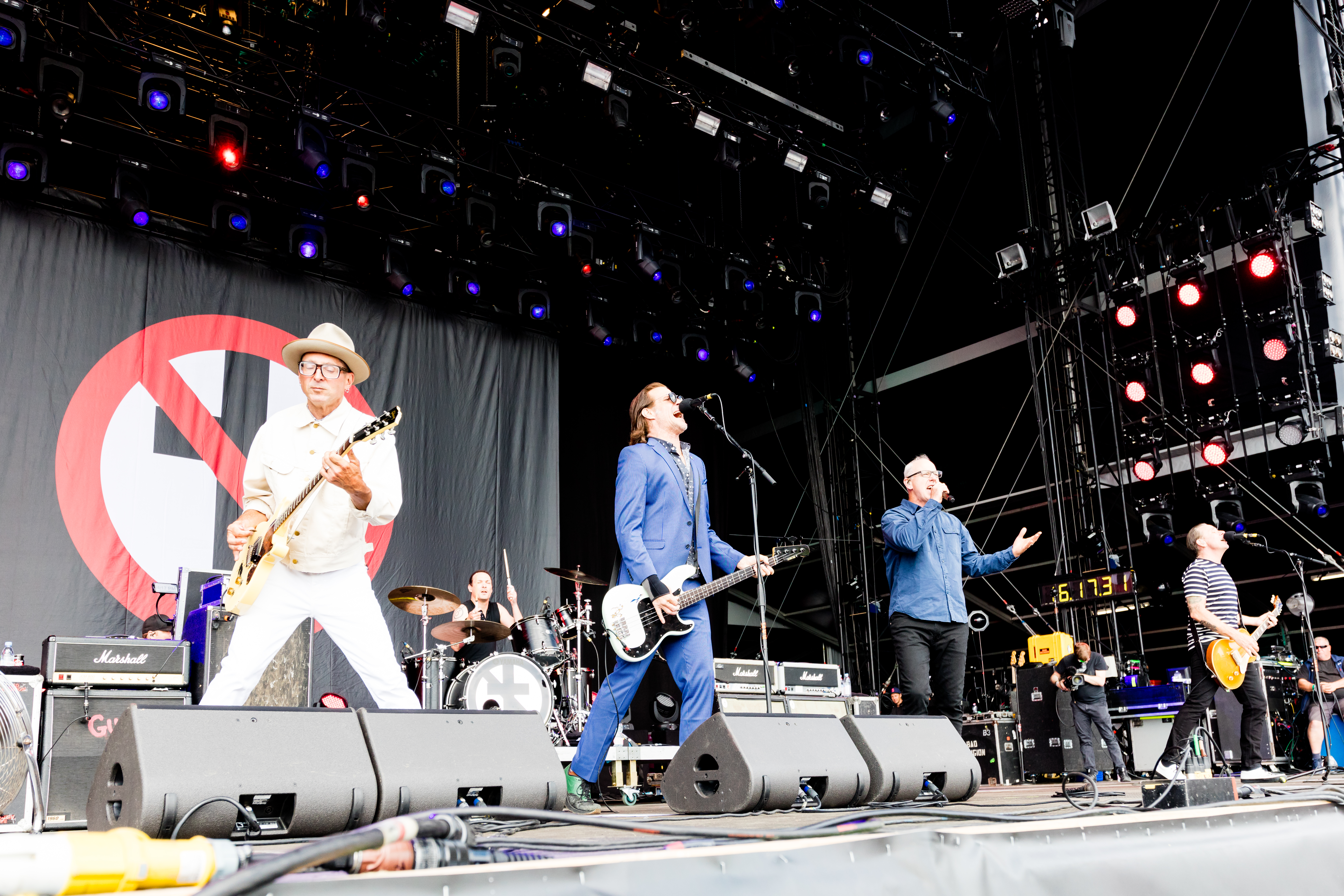
Bad Religion performing in 2018

On February 14, 2018, vocalist Greg Graffin posted on Twitter a picture of himself with guitarist Brett Gurewitz in the studio, tweeting, "New songs in the pipeline", indicating that they were working on Bad Religion's seventeenth studio album. Speculations about the album resurfaced in April of that year when Gurewitz and guitarist Brian Baker posted pictures from the studio on their respective Instagram accounts. On June 20, 2018, the band released the song, "The Kids Are Alt-Right", their first single in five years.

Despite earlier reports that they had been in the studio since February, up to mid 2018, and the fact that they had already released a new song, Gurewitz told Los Angeles Times in July 2018 that, "We're writing for a new album, recording this fall or late summer. No release date announced yet, but we should have an album's worth of 'Fuck Trump' songs pretty soon. It's exactly what we need." On February 26, 2019, Bad Religion announced Age of Unreason as the title of their seventeenth studio album, which was released on May 3, and the album's lead single, "Chaos from Within", was premiered.

On August 18, 2020, Do What You Want: The Story of Bad Religion, an autobiography covering the band's 40-year career, was released by Hachette Books.

About four months after the release of Age of Unreason, guitarist Brian Baker was asked if Bad Religion was already working on a follow-up album. His response was: "No, I'm not really thinking about a new album right now because this one is still developing and there is a lot of world yet to play. 2020 is going to be a busy year for us, it's our 40th Anniversary year. We have a book coming out at the end of the year – it'll be our first authorized, somewhat participatory, biography of Bad Religion. So there is a lot more to do with this record. The good thing about Bad Religion is that you don't really have to have a new product out to go work. The catalogue we have is so extensive and we are so fortunate to have the fan base that we have. So we don't really worry about a new album cycle, those thing just sort of come when they come. The next one might take four or five years, it might take two, I don't know. It's just about whether songs have come together in a way that is respectful of the Bad Religion standard. But in the meantime, we have Brazil to rock." When asked in August 2019 about the future of the band, Bentley stated, "Everything I know about everything came from being in this band and came from some conversations driving in the van for hours on end. We're just these guys who don't want to stop asking why. We are what we are as Bad Religion. We're the thinking man's punk band, and that's kept us out of the mainstream. We're writing smart songs, and that makes us dumb." In an August 2020 interview with Entertainment Weekly, Graffin said, "We've been working on some music, just as we're socially distant from each other; each of us has home recording studios. I always write music acoustically." In November 2022, Baker confirmed that Gurewitz was "starting to dust off his writing boots" and expressed hope that the band's next album will be recorded in 2023.

On April 29, 2020, Bad Religion announced on their social media accounts that they had to cancel all of their tour dates for that year due to the COVID-19 pandemic, including a co-headlining US tour with Alkaline Trio, therefore marking 2020 as the first year the band did not perform at least one show since their inception in 1980. They subsequently also rescheduled their South American and European tour dates with Suicidal Tendencies, Millencolin, and Pulley to 2022 (originally scheduled for May and June 2021), once again due to the COVID pandemic. They also rescheduled their North American tour with Alkaline Trio, which was slated to take place in the fall of 2021.

In October 2020, Bad Religion released a new song, "What Are We Standing For", on streaming platforms, which was an outtake from the Age of Unreason sessions.

On January 20, 2021, Bad Religion released a previously unreleased song called "Emancipation of the Mind", which was recorded during the Age of Unreason sessions. The release of the song coincided with the inauguration of Joe Biden, and it had more hopeful themes compared to other songs that they've written while also being a rejection of Trumpism.

As as early as February 2025, Bad Religion entered the studio to begin work on the follow-up album to Age of Unreason. Progress was on new music was later stalled, as Gurewitz was unsatisfied with the results, with bassist Jay Bentley recalling in April 2026: "Me and Brett and Jamie went into Jamie's studio [last year] and had a few songs to write. Brett really liked what he was doing until we recorded it and then he took it home and said, 'I'm not really into it anymore.' [He] changed his mind about what he wanted to do. And I think, my gut tells me that that's probably the thing that this band is going to have to answer to itself if we're gonna make another record, is what does that sound like? What does that record mean? What does it look like? Because we don't need to have album number 18 be the same or worse than album number 14, or we just don't know what to say. So it has to be pretty concise about what we wanna put out there." Bentley stated in November 2026 that a new Bad Religion album could be released in late 2027 at the earliest.

== Style and influences ==
Bad Religion has been described as melodic hardcore, punk rock, skate punk, and hardcore punk. The band's major influences stemmed from late 1970s punk acts like the Ramones, the Germs, the Sex Pistols, and the Clash, along with early 1980s American hardcore bands such as Black Flag, Minor Threat, and the Circle Jerks. Unlike many other hardcore bands of the era, they also acknowledged proto-punk bands like the New York Dolls, MC5, and the Stooges. Even more unusual for a band of the scene that spawned them, they were also informed by such new wavers as Elvis Costello, the Jam, and Nick Lowe, as well as authors like Jack Kerouac. The Beatles were also a huge influence on Bad Religion. The band had said that the Beatles were about the only band everyone in Bad Religion really liked.

Reviewers have repeatedly cited an upbeat and positive tone to both the band's melody and lyrics, even when dealing with dark topics.

Greg Graffin called his influences, "Pop-sounding rock tunes that were not necessarily commercial." Brett Gurewitz acknowledges attempting to emulate Germs singer Darby Crash early on in Bad Religion's lyrical style. "He wrote some intelligent stuff and didn't shy away from the vocabulary, which I thought was cool." In addition to their use of unusually sophisticated vocabulary for a punk band, Bad Religion is also known for their frequent use of vocal harmonies. They took their cues from the Adolescents in the way they used three-part harmonies. Bassist Jay Bentley said, "Seeing the Adolescents live, it was so brilliant. So, in a way, the Adolescents influenced us into saying we can do it too, because look, they're doing it."

== Legacy ==
Various bands have cited Bad Religion as an influence, including Rise Against, AFI, Parkway Drive, NOFX, I Am the Avalanche, and Miss Vincent. Funeral for a Friend vocalist Matt Davies-Kreye has also mentioned Bad Religion as an influence, particularly with their Against the Grain album.

== Beliefs ==
=== Politics ===
Many of Bad Religion's songs are about different social ills, although they try not to ascribe the causes of these ills to any single person or group. Greg Graffin believes that the current political situation in the United States can make it difficult to voice these concerns as he does not want to feed the polarization of viewpoints.

The band contributed a song to the Rock Against Bush series organized by Fat Mike's Punkvoter, a political activist group and website whose supporters are primarily left-liberal members of the punk subculture.

Brett Gurewitz attributed his anger towards former U.S. president George W. Bush as the major inspiration for The Empire Strikes First. "Our whole album is dedicated to getting Bush out of office. I'm not a presidential scholar, but I don't think you'll find a worse president in the history of the United States. He's probably one of the worst leaders in the history of world leaders. I just hate the guy." In a similar fashion, the album Age of Unreason was inspired by the band's disdain for Donald Trump.

Bad Religion performed at L7's abortion-rights benefit Rock for Choice at the Hollywood Palladium on April 30, 1993, with acts such as Stone Temple Pilots, White Zombie, Bikini Kill, King Missile, and Free Kitten with Kim Gordon. Hetson often wore a Rock for Choice T-shirt when performing, as he did when the band performed "21st Century (Digital Boy)" on Late Night with Conan O'Brien in 1994. Bentley has also worn Rock for Choice T-shirts, such as when they performed the Phoenix Festival in the United Kingdom in 1993. The band's song "Operation Rescue" on Against the Grain is a pro-choice song (named after anti-abortion organization Operation Rescue).

=== Religion ===
Faith in your partner, your fellow men, your friends, is very important, because without it there's no mutual component to your relationship, and relationships are important. So, faith plays an important role, but faith in people you don't know, faith in religious or political leaders or even people on stages, people who are popular in the public eye, you shouldn't have faith in those people. You should listen to what they have to say and use it.

— Greg Graffin

Despite the name of the band, or the band's logo, the members do not consider themselves antitheist. Singer Greg Graffin states that, more often than not, the band prefers to use religion as a metaphor for anything that does not allow for an individual's freedom to think or express themselves as they choose. In this way, their songs are more about anti-conformity than anti-religion.

Contrary to popular belief, Graffin identifies himself as a naturalist rather than an atheist. He recalled Wired Magazine interviewing him for an exposé of "the new atheists", but he was included on the sidebar rather than as a main feature, possibly because they noticed his dissatisfaction with the label. To him, "a naturalist is someone who ... first of all—they study natural science, and they have a hopeful message—I think—to send to the world, which is ... we can agree on what the truth is ... and it has to be through experimentation, verification, and new discoveries, followed by more verification." According to Graffin, people with this viewpoint can agree that the truth changes based on new discoveries, and science is structured such that one can never be too sure of something since new discoveries can fundamentally change the framework of how people view the world, which Graffin views as "a very dynamic and exciting place to be". Graffin argues that identifying as an atheist does not say much about how one came to that conclusion, while identifying as a naturalist indicates having studied science and believing "there's a fundamental way of looking at the world that is part of a long tradition."

Despite this, he did co-author the book Is Belief in God Good, Bad or Irrelevant?, which is based on a series of lengthy debates about science and religion between Graffin and historian Preston Jones. In 2010, Graffin released Anarchy Evolution, in which he promotes his naturalist worldview.

The band's bassist Jay Bentley has stated that he has spiritual beliefs.

On March 24, 2012, Bad Religion headlined the Reason Rally in Washington, D.C., sharing the stage with Eddie Izzard, Richard Dawkins, Tim Minchin and James Randi.

== Logo ==
The Crossbuster

Bad Religion's logo, a black Latin cross with a red prohibition sign over it, has been referred to by fans as the "Crossbuster". It was created by guitarist Brett Gurewitz, who drew it on a piece of paper and showed it to the rest of the band.

In the live documentary Along the Way, Greg Hetson, Greg Graffin, and Jay Bentley were all asked about the meaning. According to Hetson, it was an anti-establishment symbol, with the church seeming the easiest target for having a symbol and beliefs which do not reflect the real world.

Graffin said they all liked it when it first came out, as they were kids who thought it would "piss people off". As he got older, he still appreciated the meaning of the symbol but wished it wasn't so offensive for people who could benefit from their ideas. They view the cross as an international symbol for religion in general rather than opposing any particular religion. It was also a symbol for refusing to subscribe to dogmatic views on life such as those in religion and nationalism, which he felt were very negative for humanity since they sowed division.

Bentley recalled Gurewitz making the logo when they were fifteen years old, with all of them liking how shocking it seemed. According to Bently, people thought they were Satan worshippers who hated God, but they were more against televangelism and the concept of having to pay to be saved. It was an easy symbol to be spray painted and put on a shirt, leading to it becoming bigger than they intended and people asking about its meaning. Bently said it meant "Whatever you want it to mean, you know ... you decide."

Brian Baker, who joined the band later in their career, attributed the band's name and logo to the band being two fifteen-year-olds at the time who wanted to be as offensive as possible, not thinking they would be doing interviews 21 years later

== Concert tours ==
- Early shows (1980–1987)
- Suffer Tour (1988–1989)
- No Control Tour (1990)
- Against the Grain Tour (1991)
- Generator Tour (1992–1993)
- Recipe for Hate Tour (1993–1994)
- Stranger than Fiction Tour (1994–1995)
- The Gray Race Tour (1996–1997)
- Tested Tour (1997)
- Vans Warped Tour (1997, 1998, 2002, 2004, 2007, 2009)
- No Substance Tour (1998–1999)
- The New America Tour (2000–2001)
- The Process of Belief Tour (2002–2003)
- The Empire Strikes First Tour (2004–2006)
- New Maps of Hell Tour (2007–2009)
- 30 Years Live Tour (2010)
- The Dissent of Man Tour (2010–2011)
- Rise Against and Four Year Strong Tour (2011)
- Australian Soundwave Tour (2012)
- True North Tour (2013–2014)
- Summer Nationals Tour with the Offspring and Pennywise (2014)
- North American and European Tours (2015)
- South American and European Tours (2016)
- The Vox Populi Tour with Against Me! and Dave Hause (2016)
- European Tour (2017)
- Punk in Drublic Tour (2017)
- Punk in Drublic Tour Germany (2019)
- Age of Unreason Tour North America (2019)
- United States Tour with Alkaline Trio and War on Women (2021)
- Summer Of Discontent Tour with Dropkick Murphys and The Mainliners (2025)

== Band members ==
Current members

- Greg Graffin – lead vocals (1980–present), keyboards (1980–1983)
- Brett Gurewitz – guitar, backing vocals (1980–1983, 1988–1994, 2001–present; not touring since 2001)
- Jay Bentley – bass, backing vocals (1980–1982, 1986–present)
- Brian Baker – guitar, backing vocals (1994–present)
- Mike Dimkich – guitar (2013–present)
- Jamie Miller – drums (2016–present)

== Discography ==
Studio albums

- How Could Hell Be Any Worse? (1982)
- Into the Unknown (1983)
- Suffer (1988)
- No Control (1989)
- Against the Grain (1990)
- Generator (1992)
- Recipe for Hate (1993)
- Stranger than Fiction (1994)
- The Gray Race (1996)
- No Substance (1998)
- The New America (2000)
- The Process of Belief (2002)
- The Empire Strikes First (2004)
- New Maps of Hell (2007)
- The Dissent of Man (2010)
- True North (2013)
- Age of Unreason (2019)
