= Trust (magazine) =

Trust is a free bi-annual investment trust magazine issued by Baillie Gifford, the Edinburgh-based investment management company. First published in June 2004, it reached issue 36 in March 2018.

== Content ==
Trust contains a variety of stimulating features and news, with contributions from professionals at Baillie Gifford and topical investment articles written by respected financial journalists.

== Formats ==
Initially, Trust was available to download online in PDF format, but in February 2010 the company launched Trust Online, an interactive website featuring all the magazine content as well as additional web-only investment trust articles. Since then the magazine has become available in a digital e-zine version.

== Awards ==
Trust has won several awards at the Association of Investment Companies ‘Best Information to Shareholders Awards.’ It won ‘Best Newsletter’ for the fourth year running in 2014. It previously won the award in 2013, 2012 and 2011.
