= Jay Ziskrout =

American drummer

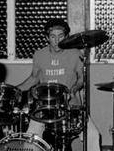
- Ziskrout in 1980

Background information
- Born: Jay Ziskrout; September 8, 1962 (age 63)
- Genres: punk rock
- Occupation: Drummer
- Years active: 1980
- Formerly of: Bad Religion

Jay Ziskrout (born September 8, 1962) was the first drummer for Bad Religion, forming the group with schoolmate Brett Gurewitz in 1980. Ziskrout performed on Bad Religion's self-titled EP and half on their debut album How Could Hell Be Any Worse?. He decided to leave the band with only half of the songs recorded due to the other band members not listening to him. Bad Religion replaced him with his drum roadie, Pete Finestone.

After leaving Bad Religion, Jay formed the band Electric Peace. They would go on to release four albums including one on Enigma Records. Ziskrout would go on to be managing director for Epitaph Records Europe, Vice President of Album Promotion for Arista Records, COO of CMJ, and founder of Grita! Records.

For Grita! Records he signed or released such artists as:

- Los Mas Turbados (Spain)
- Cerebros Exprimidos (Spain)
- The Pleasure Fuckers (Spain), featuring Kike Turmix
- La Polla Records (Spain)
- Blind Pigs (Brazil) [Jay also produced the band's "São Paulo Chaos" album at BeBop Studios in São Paulo, Brasil]
- Todos Tus Muertos (Argentina)
- The Psychotic Aztecs (USA), featuring Tito Larriva (Tito & Tarantula, Cruzados), Steven Hufstetter (Cruzados), Johnny Vatos (Oingo Boingo), and John Avila (Oingo Boingo)
- Negu Gorriak (Spain)
- Ninos Con Bombas (Germany); former project of Chilean artist Daniel Puente Encina
- Volumen Cero (USA)
- ¡Viva Malpache! (USA)
- Voodoo Glow Skulls (USA)
