= Bad Religion (EP) =

EP by Bad Religion
- Released: February 1981
- Recorded: October 1980
- Studio: Studio 9 in Los Angeles
- Genre: Hardcore punk
- Length: 9:41
- Label: Epitaph (EPI 001)
- Producer: Bad Religion, Big Dick

Bad Religion chronology
Bad Religion (1981)	How Could Hell Be Any Worse? (1982)

Bad Religion (also referred to as The Bad Religion EP) is the first official recording by the Los Angeles punk rock band Bad Religion. It was released in February 1981 by guitarist Brett Gurewitz's record label Epitaph Records, with the catalog number EPI 001.

== Recording ==
The recording sessions for the EP took place in October 1980 at a demo studio called Studio 9, located above an office and drugstore in Los Angeles on Sunset Boulevard and Western Avenue. The EP was mastered by Stan Ross at Gold Star Studios in Hollywood. At the time of the EP's release, vocalist Greg Graffin and bassist Jay Bentley were both 16 years old, while Gurewitz and drummer Jay Ziskrout were both 18. The EP was financed by a loan from Gurewitz's father, Richard Gurewitz, who is listed as co-producer under the moniker 'Big Dick'.

The song "Drastic Actions" is influenced by the Germs' track "Shut Down (Annihilation Man)".

== Reissues ==
The Bad Religion EP has been reissued a number of times, mostly on vinyl. It was initially released on 7-inch vinyl, and reissued in 1984 as a 12-inch with a different sound mix. In West Germany, a 7" bootleg limited edition of the EP was released in 1989, packaged with then-current album No Control. The EP was also pressed on compact cassettes, but those editions are rare. While the Bad Religion EP has never been released as a standalone CD, it was included on the 1991 compilation album 80–85, and on the 2004 CD reissue of the group's 1982 debut studio album, How Could Hell Be Any Worse?, which featured the same track listing as 80–85. The EP was reissued on April 18, 2009, in conjunction with Record Store Day, in a limited edition of 1,000.

== Reception ==
At the time of the original release, the Bad Religion EP received positive reviews from various fanzines. Brenda Jamrus of the punk rock magazine Ripper called the EP "a real powerful six song EP from Bad Religion". She added that "when so many bands are moving away from political overtones, these four guys are keeping politics alive" and described the songs as "fast and solid".

Dave Stimson reviewed the EP for the 16th issue of Touch and Go. In it, he said, "Unlike many LA based bands where all it takes is one listen and you're already dripping slobber on the floor, Bad Religion takes some time before winning over their legion of fans, which must be many cuz [sic] this is a great record. When you first hear it, you say same old LA-styled punk, good, but nothing to get excited about. Now that's where you're wrong. This is perhaps the best debut record since Nervous Breakdown. I can't quite put my finger on it...something like Black Flag meets Neg Trend".

== Track listing ==
Side 1
No.	Title	Writer(s)	Length
1.	"Bad Religion"	Brett Gurewitz	1:49
2.	"Politics"	Greg Graffin	1:21
3.	"Sensory Overload"	Gurewitz	1:31

Side 2
No.	Title	Writer(s)	Length
4.	"Slaves"	Graffin	1:20
5.	"Drastic Actions"	Gurewitz	2:36
6.	"World War III"	Graffin	0:54
Total length:			9:41

== Personnel ==
Bad Religion

- Greg Graffin - vocals
- Brett Gurewitz - guitar
- Jay Bentley - bass
- Jay Ziskrout - drums

Technical

- Bad Religion; Big Dick - producers
- Stan Ross - mastering
- Brett Gurewitz - engineering
- Gary Leonard - photography
