= Back to the Known =

EP by Bad Religion
- Released: April 12, 1985
- Recorded: February 1985
- Studio: Pacifica Studios, Los Angeles
- Genre: Punk rock; hardcore punk
- Length: 10:37
- Label: Epitaph
- Producer: Brett Gurewitz; Greg Graffin

Bad Religion chronology
Into the Unknown (1983)	Back to the Known (1985)	Suffer (1988)

Professional ratings
Review scores
Source	Rating
AllMusic	3.5/5 stars

Back to the Known is the second EP released by American punk rock band Bad Religion. The name of the EP is a reference to the band abandoning the progressive rock influences of its previous album, 1983's Into the Unknown, and returning to its punk roots.

The album features a re-recording of "Bad Religion", a song from their 1981 self-titled EP. and the fan favorite "Along The Way", which is a staple of their live shows today. During a live show in the mid 1980s, they played the song twice in a row at a sped-up pace the second time.

== History ==
Frontman Greg Graffin partially brought Bad Religion back together in 1984 and hired two new members, Circle Jerks guitarist Greg Hetson (who would remain with the band until 2013) and bassist Tim Gallegos. Drummer Pete Finestone (who left in 1982) also rejoined during this time. The new line-up recorded a new EP, which had only five songs, and was just over ten minutes long. It was originally released in a 12" format, with only one side of the vinyl containing all five tracks. The A-side contained no music or sound of any kind and was mirror-smooth. It was re-released as part of the 1991 compilation '80-'85, and again remastered for the 2004 reissue, How Could Hell Be Any Worse?.

There has been some confusion over when Back to the Known was released. Due to a typo on a number of internet sources and the back cover of the vinyl, many believe that the EP was released in 1984, but this appears to be false. According to a Bad Religion fan site, the EP was recorded in 1985 with then-former and now-current guitarist Brett Gurewitz producing it.

No songs from this EP made it on to the band's 1995 compilation album, All Ages.

== Track listing ==
No.	Title	Writer(s)	Length
1.	"Yesterday"	Greg Graffin	2:39
2.	"Frogger"	Greg Hetson (Note: Credited to Greg Graffin and Wryebo Martin on the original release; credited to Greg Hetson on the 2004 reissue of How Could Hell Be Any Worse?; The Bad Religion Page website lists Graffin and Hetson as songwriters, writing, "Co-written by the two Gregs. Wryebo Martin, a friend of theirs, came up with the title or the chorus or something, but not much according to Hetson.")	1:19
3.	"Bad Religion"	Brett Gurewitz	2:10
4.	"Along the Way"	Graffin	1:36
5.	"New Leaf"	Graffin	2:53
Total length:			10:37

== Personnel ==
Adapted from the album liner notes.

- Greg Graffin – vocals, acoustic guitar on "New Leaf", production
- Greg Hetson – electric guitar
- Tim Gallegos – bass
- Pete Finestone – drums
- Brett Gurewitz – production, engineering
