= Against the Grain (Bad Religion album) =

Studio album by Bad Religion
- Released: November 23, 1990
- Recorded: May 1990
- Studios: Westbeach Recorders, Hollywood, California
- Genres: Hardcore punk; melodic hardcore
- Length: 34:56
- Label: Epitaph
- Producer: Bad Religion

Bad Religion chronology
No Control (1989)	Against the Grain (1990)	80–85 (1991)

Against the Grain is the fifth album (and seventh release overall) by American punk rock band Bad Religion, released on November 23, 1990. It was the last album recorded with drummer Pete Finestone, who left in 1991 to concentrate with his new project The Fishermen. Following his departure, the band's music would take a different direction on their next album, 1992's Generator. Against the Grain was also the first Bad Religion album not to feature a lineup change from the previous two albums.

Despite no promotion by radio and television, Against the Grain managed to sell over 100,000 copies. A tiny part of the album's title track is played in a segment of the same name on The Dan Patrick Show.

== Background and recording ==
Bad Religion released their fourth studio album No Control in 1989, which went on to sell 60,000 copies.

Writing and demoing for Against the Grain began in 1989, and Bad Religion entered Westbeach Recorders in May 1990 to record the album. Against the Grain is one of the few Bad Religion albums to feature songs not written by Greg Graffin or Brett Gurewitz. One song is written by bass player Jay Bentley alone, whereas another is co-written by Bentley and Greg Hetson. According to Bentley, with the band's building popularity, they received an offer from a member of the E Street Band. Said member wanted the band to re-record Against the Grain with him as the producer, and also proposed re-writing the songs.

== Release and reception ==
Professional ratings
Review scores
Source	Rating
AllMusic	4.5/5 stars
Alternative Rock	7/10
Christgau's Consumer Guide	(1-star Honorable Mention)
The Rolling Stone Album Guide	4/5 stars
Spin Alternative Record Guide	8/10

Against the Grain was released shortly after the conclusion of the No Control tour which had lasted until the middle of 1990. The album was highly anticipated by both music critics and fans as a result of the band's success with their 1988 post-reunion album Suffer and its 1989 follow-up No Control. While Against the Grain still failed to break Bad Religion into mainstream audiences, it was the first 100,000 seller, and showed how quickly they were growing. By 1992, the album had sold approximately 90,000 copies.

The album has received generally favorable reviews in the years since its initial release. AllMusic's Johnny Loftus said that Against the Grain "found the band's edge honed sharper than it had been in years", and claimed that "Bad Religion had always warned against the excesses of the future and the assimilation of individuality. But the gospel cut deeper with Against the Grain. Songs began in an instant, with the single crack of a snare drum signaling the beginning of another screed." Author Dave Thompson, in his book Alternative Rock (2000), wrote: "This album goes anywhere but [against the grain]. The now-trademarked multi-part harmonies emerge full born, and though the songs remain frenetic, the sound is brighter, bigger, verging on anthemic."

The album's 13th track, "21st Century (Digital Boy)", was re-recorded and appeared as a single on their eighth full-length studio album Stranger Than Fiction, released in 1994, four years after the release of Against the Grain.

== Album cover ==
The album cover of Against the Grain is a painting by Joy Aoki of the same name. It depicts rows of corn that, with the exception of one, bear right-facing, missile-tipped stalks. The lone ear of corn faces left.

== Track listing ==
Side one
No.	Title	Writer(s)	Length
1.	"Modern Man"	Greg Graffin	1:57
2.	"Turn on the Light"	Brett Gurewitz	1:24
3.	"Get Off"	Graffin	1:42
4.	"Blenderhead"	Gurewitz	1:12
5.	"The Positive Aspect of Negative Thinking"	Jay Bentley	0:57
6.	"Anesthesia"	Gurewitz	3:02
7.	"Flat Earth Society"	Gurewitz	2:21
8.	"Faith Alone"	Graffin	3:38

Side two
No.	Title	Writer(s)	Length
9.	"Entropy"	Graffin	2:23
10.	"Against the Grain"	Graffin	2:07
11.	"Operation Rescue"	Graffin	2:06
12.	"God Song"	Graffin	1:37
13.	"21st Century (Digital Boy)"	Gurewitz	2:49
14.	"Misery and Famine"	Graffin	2:34
15.	"Unacceptable"	Greg Hetson, Bentley	1:44
16.	"Quality or Quantity"	Graffin	1:33
17.	"Walk Away"	Gurewitz	1:50
Total length:			34:56

== Personnel ==
Adapted from the album liner notes.

Bad Religion

- Greg Graffin – vocals
- Brett Gurewitz – guitar, horns, backing vocals
- Greg Hetson – guitar
- Jay Bentley – bass guitar, backing vocals
- Pete Finestone – drums

Additional musicians

- Keith Morris – backing vocals (track 11)

Technical

- Bad Religion – production
- The Legendary Starbolt – engineering
- Karat Faye – mixing (tracks 5 and 15)
- Eddie Schreyer – mastering
- Joy Aoki – art direction, illustration
- Kim Bockus – photography

== Release history ==
Label	Release date	Notes
Epitaph Records	November 23, 1990	The tray card features an image of an arrow behind a corn in purple background. The back cover has the same image, but the background is white and the corn is yellow. The lyrics and the credits can be seen in the booklet as well as images of the band members.
Epitaph Records	April 6, 2004	Remastered, along with How Could Hell Be Any Worse?, Suffer, No Control and Generator. Same as above, except this version features a different front cover and the track listing, which can be seen inside the tray card.
