= No Control (Bad Religion album) =

Studio album by Bad Religion
- Released: November 2, 1989
- Recorded: June 1989
- Studios: Westbeach Recorders, Hollywood, California
- Genres: Hardcore punk; melodic hardcore
- Length: 26:15
- Label: Epitaph
- Producer: Bad Religion

Bad Religion chronology
Suffer (1988)	No Control (1989)	Against the Grain (1990)

No Control is the fourth studio album by American punk rock band Bad Religion, released on November 2, 1989, through Epitaph Records. Bad Religion began work on the album while touring in support of their previous album, Suffer (1988). No Control is stylistically faster than its predecessor, owing more to hardcore punk. Additionally, it was the first Bad Religion album not to feature a lineup change from the previous album.

No Control brought Bad Religion a small amount of success in Southern California as the band started to gather a following. By 1992, about 80,000 copies were sold and it is often considered to be a landmark in hardcore punk. It contains many of the band's live staples, such as "Change of Ideas", "Big Bang", "No Control", "Sometimes I Feel Like", "Automatic Man", "I Want to Conquer the World", "Sanity" and "You". Up until 2019, the only songs from No Control that had never been performed live were "Progress" and "The World Won't Stop". The songs were live debuted when Bad Religion played the album in its entirety at the Roxy on April 5, 2019.

== Background and recording ==
After a long-term hiatus, Bad Religion reformed in 1987 with a new lineup, releasing the studio album Suffer in 1988. Although Suffer was not a commercial success, the band earned a growing fan base in the underground music community and critical acclaim with that album and it managed to sell 4,000 copies. While Bad Religion continued touring in support of Suffer, Greg Graffin and Brett Gurewitz began writing songs in late 1988/early 1989 for the band's next record. Bassist Jay Bentley commented on the making of No Control, stating that "songs were being written all the time. I wouldn't go so far as to say an 'album's worth', but during the U.S. and subsequent European tour into '89, lots of ideas were coming to fruition. I would think that more songs were written during the down time between tours and 'perfected' on the road." Recording for No Control took place in June 1989 at Westbeach Recorders, where Suffer was made, and it was the band's first experience recording an album on a half-inch two track. Gurewitz noted that he put every track through a compellor by using Aphex Systems, then, having completed this, he decided he hated the "weird sound" this had produced. As a result, he recalls spending a great deal of effort during the mixing stage to remove the compression. The overall result was an "aggressive and distinctive" sound which he now favors. Contrary to rumor, "21st Century (Digital Boy)" (which appears on Against the Grain and again on Stranger than Fiction) was not written and recorded for this album.

== Release and reception ==
Professional ratings
Review scores
Source	Rating
AllMusic	4.5/5 stars
Alternative Rock	7/10
The Rolling Stone Album Guide	3/5 stars
Spin Alternative Record Guide	7/10
The Village Voice	B+

No Control was released through Epitaph Records on November 2, 1989. By the time it was released, Bad Religion had become one of the most critically praised hardcore punk bands of the time, in spite of lack of mainstream success. 12,000 copies of No Control were originally shipped, and later ended up selling 60,000, according to Bentley. Imported copies of No Control to West Germany were repackaged with a limited edition bootleg 7" of their debut self-titled EP (1981). By 1992, No Control had sold at least 80,000 copies, becoming the band's fourth best-selling album at the time (their next album Against the Grain sold approximately 90,000 copies, while its follow-up Generator sold 85,000 and Suffer sold 88,000).

The album has received generally favorable reviews in the years since its initial release, with several reviewers having deemed No Control one of Bad Religion's best albums. AllMusic's Johnny Loftus said that it "simply and forcefully continued the shift, delivering a pummel of melodic songwriting made sharp by Greg Graffin's populist cynicism and the stinging barbs of a twin-guitar strike...", and described the change as "welcome, as it makes the band sound that much more direct on principal cuts." Author Dave Thompson, in his book Alternative Rock (2000), found it to be polished to a "fine gleam," sounding "even tighter than Suffer, with even stronger songs."

In a May 2012 interview, Pennywise guitarist Fletcher Dragge stated that his band's tenth studio album All or Nothing had inspired guitarist Brett Gurewitz to write "another No Control". Rise Against cited the album as one of their 12 key influences, alongside works by Dead Kennedys, Fugazi and Jawbreaker.

On June 2, 2016, the song "Change of Ideas" was placed at No. 7 on Loudwire's top ten list "Greatest Songs Under One Minute Long".

== Track listing ==
Side one
No.	Title	Writer(s)	Length
1.	"Change of Ideas"	Greg Graffin	0:55
2.	"Big Bang"	Brett Gurewitz	1:42
3.	"No Control"	Graffin	1:46
4.	"Sometimes I Feel Like"	Gurewitz	1:34
5.	"Automatic Man"	Gurewitz	1:40
6.	"I Want to Conquer the World"	Gurewitz	2:19
7.	"Sanity"	Gurewitz	2:44

Side two
No.	Title	Writer(s)	Length
8.	"Henchman"	Graffin	1:07
9.	"It Must Look Pretty Appealing"	Graffin	1:23
10.	"You"	Gurewitz	2:05
11.	"Progress"	Graffin	2:14
12.	"I Want Something More"	Gurewitz	0:47
13.	"Anxiety"	Graffin	2:08
14.	"Billy"	Gurewitz	1:54
15.	"The World Won't Stop"	Graffin	1:57
Total length:			26:15

== Release history ==
Label	Release date	Notes
Epitaph Records	November 2, 1989	The tray card and back cover feature an image of a collage with the band members' faces. The lyrics and the credits can be seen in the booklet.
Epitaph Records	April 6, 2004	Remastered, along with How Could Hell Be Any Worse?, Suffer, Against the Grain and Generator. Same as above, except there is a group shot of the band, which can be seen inside the tray card.

== Other uses ==
- Track 3, "No Control" quotes Scottish natural historian James Hutton, "no vestige of a beginning, no prospect of an end."
- "Sometimes I Feel Like" was labeled as "Sometimes I Feel Like... *?!%+!*" on the disc to the original CD version.
- "Billy" was erroneously labeled as "Bizzy" on the cassette version.
- "The World Won't Stop" was also labeled as "The World Won't Stop Without You" on the disc to the original CD version. Also, in some software-based audio players and CD rippers that use CD lookup databases such as CDDB, "The World Won't Stop" is tagged as "The World Won't Stop Without You".
- "No Control" (along with Suffer) is also mentioned in the song "21st Century (Digital Boy)" (from 1990's Against the Grain and 1994's Stranger than Fiction), when band's guitarist Brett Gurewitz sings "tried to tell you about no control, but now I really don't know, and then you told me how bad you had to suffer, is that really all you have to offer".

== Personnel ==
Adapted from the album liner notes.

Bad Religion

- Greg Graffin – lead vocals, backing vocals
- Greg Hetson – guitar
- Brett Gurewitz – guitar, backing vocals
- Jay Bentley – bass guitar, backing vocals
- Pete Finestone – drums

Technical

- Bad Religion – producer
- Brett Gurewitz – engineer (credited as The Legendary Starbolt)
- Donnell Cameron – engineer
- Eddie Schreyer – mastering
- Norman Moore – cover art
- Pierre Deauville – computer effects
- Analisa Pessin – photography
