= Westbeach Recorders =

Recording studio in Hollywood, California

- Industry: Music (recording)
- Genre: Punk rock
- Founded: 1985 in Culver City, California
- Founder: Brett Gurewitz
- Defunct: May 12, 2010
- Fate: Dissolved
- Headquarters: 6035 Hollywood Boulevard, Los Angeles, California, United States

Westbeach Recorders was a recording studio in Hollywood, California famous for recording punk rock groups, such as Bad Religion, Avenged Sevenfold, NOFX, Rancid, the Offspring and Pennywise.

== History ==
It was established in 1985 by Bad Religion guitarist Brett Gurewitz in Culver City, California after he attended recording school, and re-located to Hollywood, California in February 1987. They moved for the final time in 1991 to the former location of Seymour Heller's Producer's Workshop studios on Hollywood Boulevard. In a back room closet at this location, Epitaph Records had its first office.

Donnell Cameron became a partner in 1988 and was the studio owner/engineer until May 12, 2010, when Westbeach Recorders went out of business.
