= Brett Gurewitz =

American guitarist (born 1962)

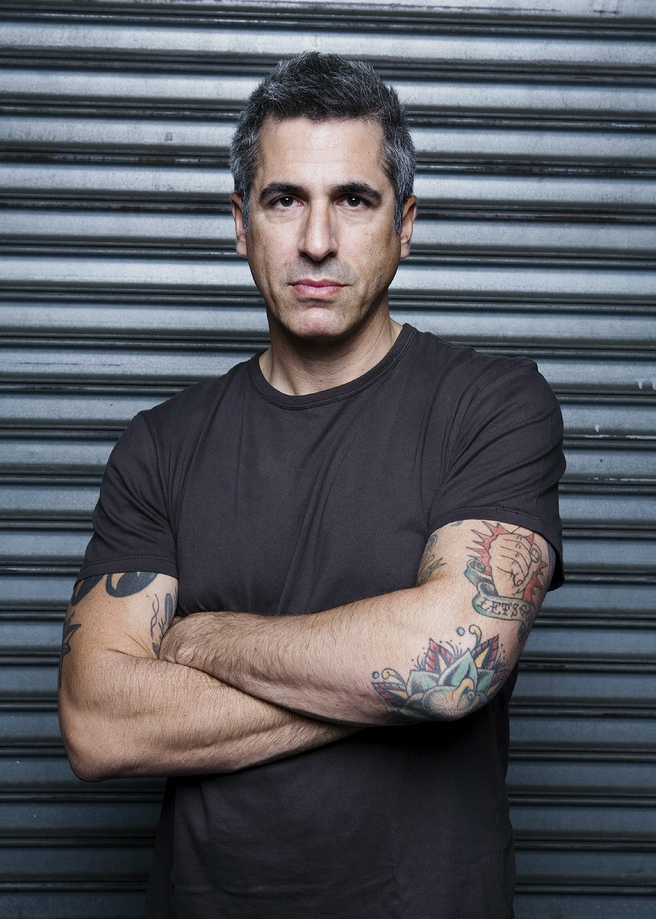
- Gurewitz in 2007

Background information
- Birth name: Brett W. Gurewitz
- Also known as: Mr. Brett; Brett Religion; The Legendary Starbolt
- Born: May 12, 1962 (age 63); Los Angeles, California, U.S.
- Origin: Southern California, U.S.
- Genres: Punk rock; melodic hardcore; skate punk
- Occupations: Musician; songwriter; producer
- Instrument: Guitar
- Years active: 1979–present
- Labels: Epitaph
- Member of: Bad Religion
- Formerly of: Daredevils; Error

Brett W. Gurewitz (born May 12, 1962), nicknamed Mr. Brett, is an American musician and record producer, best known as the co-founder and guitarist of the punk band Bad Religion. He is also the owner of the music label Epitaph Records and a number of sister labels. He has produced albums for Bad Religion as well as Epitaph Records labelmates NOFX, Rancid, and Pennywise, among others. Gurewitz also had a project called Error, which also featured Atticus Ross, Leopold Ross, and Greg Puciato. He is also the co-founder of comic book and graphic novel publisher, Black Mask Studios.

Gurewitz founded Bad Religion in 1980 with Greg Graffin, Jay Bentley and Jay Ziskrout. After releasing two albums and one EP, he left the band in 1983, but rejoined three years later, and recorded five more albums with the band before they signed to Atlantic Records in 1993. The success of his record label Epitaph prompted Gurewitz to leave Bad Religion once again in 1994, and run the label on a full-time basis. During his hiatus from Bad Religion, he released the "Hate You" single in 1996 with his one-off project Daredevils, and entered a period of drug addiction. By 1999, Gurewitz had successfully completed drug rehabilitation, and two years later he rejoined Bad Religion, appearing on six more studio albums with them.

== Career ==
=== Bad Religion ===
Then-18-year-old Brett Gurewitz formed Bad Religion in Woodland Hills in 1980 with Greg Graffin (vocals), Jay Ziskrout (drums) and Jay Bentley (bass). All four attended El Camino Real High School. Soon after, they began writing songs and played their first ever concert, as warm-up for Social Distortion. In 1981, Bad Religion recorded a six-song self-titled EP, which was initially released in a 7" format, and soon afterward re-issued as a 12". Compact cassettes were also produced, but they are rare.

Bad Religion's first full-length album, How Could Hell Be Any Worse?, was released in 1982. When recording sessions commenced, Ziskrout soon left the band and was replaced by Pete Finestone. Cited as one of Bad Religion's most important works, How Could Hell Be Any Worse? was financed by a $3,000 loan from Gurewitz's father. Its success surprised the band when it sold 10,000 copies in under a year. The sound of the record was vastly improved from the self-titled EP. Although not yet credited as a member of the band, Greg Hetson (of Circle Jerks fame) did a guitar solo on "Part III".

Bad Religion released their second full-length, Into the Unknown, in 1983, but were less successful, due to the album's poor production. It was a major change from their previous style, delving into progressive rock heavy in keyboards. While recording one song, Bentley and Finestone left the band and were replaced by Paul Dedona on bass and Davy Goldman on drums. The album, Into the Unknown is out of print, but is included in their 30th anniversary box set.

After the release of Into the Unknown, Bad Religion broke up, but reformed (without Gurewitz) to produce the 1985 EP Back to the Known. The EP features the return of the band's punk rock roots, although also reflecting influences of then current acts such as Hüsker Dü and The Descendents. Soon after, Bad Religion went on hiatus again.

After the How Could Hell Be Any Worse? line-up (also including Hetson) reunited in 1986, Bad Religion released their highly acclaimed album Suffer in 1988. The album was a comeback for Bad Religion as well as a watershed for the Southern California punk sound popularized by their label Epitaph Records, owned by Gurewitz. The reunion line-up recorded two more highly acclaimed albums, No Control (1989) and Against the Grain (1990), before Finestone left the group in early 1991.

Bad Religion replaced Finestone with Bobby Schayer, then recorded their next album, Generator, which was already completed in the spring of 1991, but was forced to delay its release until a year later. For the album, Bad Religion also filmed their first music video "Atomic Garden", which was also their first song to be released as a single. In 1993, the band left their original label Epitaph Records and signed to Atlantic Records, who released their next album Recipe for Hate. While moderately successful, this was the first Bad Religion album to reach any Billboard charts and two videos for the album, "American Jesus" and "Struck a Nerve", were made.

Bad Religion rose to fame with their next album, 1994's Stranger Than Fiction, including their well-known hits "Infected" and "21st Century (Digital Boy)", which are also often considered concert staples. After the album was completed, Gurewitz soon left Bad Religion to concentrate on the future of Epitaph, citing the increasing amount of time he was spending at Epitaph's offices as The Offspring became one of the biggest bands of the mid-1990s. Gurewitz was replaced by Brian Baker during the Stranger Than Fiction tour and Bad Religion recorded two albums without him.

In 1999, after a five-year hiatus from the band, Gurewitz reunited with Graffin and co-wrote the song "Believe It", which appeared on Bad Religion's 11th album The New America (2000). Two years later, after parting ways with Atlantic Records, Gurewitz was officially back in the band and Bad Religion resigned to Epitaph. Schayer also left the band during the time and was replaced by Brooks Wackerman. Now as a six piece, Bad Religion recorded and released the albums The Process of Belief (2002), The Empire Strikes First (2004), New Maps of Hell (2007), The Dissent of Man (2010), and True North (2013), the latter featuring his only contribution as a lead vocalist on the track Dharma and the Bomb. Due to his commitments with Epitaph Records, Gurewitz rarely performs live with the band and restricts his input to songwriting and recording. He does perform occasional live appearances with the band at shows close to his hometown Los Angeles (e.g. he appears on the band's DVD Live at the Palladium).

=== Error ===
In 2003, Gurewitz was recruited by 12 Rounds member and Nine Inch Nails collaborator Atticus Ross and his younger brother Leopold to play guitar and bass in an electro-hardcore project called Error. Their only release to date is a self-titled EP, which was in 2004. Following the release of the EP, Error was reported to be looking for a full-time vocalist for touring and a full-length debut; however, the future of the project has been a topic for discussion on many internet message boards. In 2005, Error recorded one new song, "Wild World", that appears on a tribute album to The Birthday Party called Release the Bats: The Birthday Party as Heard Through the Meat Grinder of Three One G, which was released on April 4, 2006. Error has been on hiatus since and it is unclear whether the project will return anytime in the future.

== Personal life ==
Gurewitz grew up in Woodland Hills, Los Angeles, where he was brought up Jewish.

In 1997, Gurewitz temporarily left Epitaph to undergo treatment for addiction.

He is married to Gina Davis, who had worked at Epitaph, and they live in California. He is a deist.

== Selected discography ==
| Year | Artist/Band | Album | Role |
|---|---|---|---|
| 1981 | Bad Religion | Bad Religion | Producer and guitars |
| 1982 | Bad Religion | How Could Hell Be Any Worse? | Producer and guitars |
| 1983 | Bad Religion | Into the Unknown | Producer and guitars |
| 1985 | Bad Religion | Back to the Known | Producer |
| 1985 | The Seeing Eye Gods | The Seeing Eye Gods | Vocals, all instruments, producer, engineer (credited as "Billy Pilgrim") |
| 1988 | Bad Religion | Suffer | Producer, guitars and background vocals |
| 1988 | L7 | L7 | Producer |
| 1988 | NOFX | Liberal Animation | Producer |
| 1989 | Bad Religion | No Control | Producer, guitars and background vocals |
| 1989 | NOFX | S&M Airlines | Producer |
| 1990 | Jughead's Revenge | Unstuck in Time | Producer |
| 1990 | Bad Religion | Against the Grain | Producer, guitars and background vocals |
| 1990 | No Use for a Name | Incognito | Producer, guitars and background vocals |
| 1991 | Bad Religion | 80–85 | Producer, guitars and background vocals |
| 1991 | Down by Law | Down by Law | Producer, guitars and background vocals |
| 1991 | NOFX | Ribbed | Producer |
| 1991 | Samiam | Soar | Producer |
| 1992 | Bad Religion | Generator | Producer, guitars and background vocals |
| 1992 | L7 | Bricks Are Heavy | Co-wrote "Scrap" |
| 1992 | Chemical People | Chemical People | Background vocals |
| 1992 | Down by Law | Blue | Producer and engineer |
| 1993 | Bad Religion | Recipe for Hate | Producer, guitars and background vocals |
| 1993 | Rancid | Rancid | Background vocals |
| 1994 | Bad Religion | Stranger Than Fiction | Producer, guitars and background vocals |
| 1994 | Rancid | Let's Go | Producer and engineer |
| 1995 | Bad Religion | All Ages | Producer, guitars and background vocals |
| 1995 | Pennywise | About Time | Producer |
| 1995 | Rancid | ...And Out Come the Wolves | Engineer |
| 1996 | Daredevils | Hate You | Guitars and vocals |
| 1997 | Pennywise | Full Circle | Mixer |
| 1997 | The Pietasters | Willis | Producer and engineer |
| 1999 | H_{2}O | F.T.T.W. | Producer |
| 1999 | The Pietasters | Awesome Mix Tape vol. 6 | Backing vocals, additional percussion, producer and engineer |
| 2000 | Bad Religion | The New America | Co-wrote and played guitar on the song "Believe It". |
| 2000 | Millencolin | Pennybridge Pioneers | Producer and Acoustic Guitar on "The Ballad". |
| 2000 | Rancid | Rancid | Producer |
| 2000 | Voodoo Glow Skulls | Symbolic | Producer |
| 2001 | Pennywise | Land of the Free? | Co-wrote "Who's on Your Side" |
| 2002 | Bad Religion | The Process of Belief | Producer, guitars and background vocals |
| 2002 | The Distillers | Sing Sing Death House | Engineer and mixing |
| 2003 | Matchbook Romance | West For Wishing | Producer, engineer and mixer |
| 2003 | Rancid | Indestructible | Vocals, producer, engineer and mixing |
| 2004 | Bad Religion | The Empire Strikes First | Producer, guitars and background vocals |
| 2005 | The Unseen | State of Discontent | Mixer |
| 2006 | From First to Last | Heroine | Background vocals |
| 2006 | The Matches | Decomposer | Producer |
| 2006 | Greg Graffin | Cold as the Clay | Producer and background vocals |
| 2007 | Bad Religion | New Maps of Hell | Guitars and background vocals |
| 2009 | Rancid | Let the Dominoes Fall | Producer |
| 2010 | Bad Religion | The Dissent of Man | Guitars and background vocals |
| 2010 | Parkway Drive | Deep Blue | Guest vocals on "Home Is for the Heartless" |
| 2011 | Heartsounds | Drifter | Producer (vocals) |
| 2013 | Bad Religion | True North | Guitars and also a producer |
| 2013 | Bad Religion | Christmas Songs | Guitar, backing vocals |
| 2014 | Rancid | Honor Is All We Know | Producer |
| 2017 | Rancid | Trouble Maker | Producer |
| 2019 | Bad Religion | Age of Unreason | Guitar, backing vocals, producer |
| 2023 | Rancid | Tomorrow Never Comes | Producer |
