= Into the Unknown (Bad Religion album) =

Studio album by Bad Religion
- Released: August 1983
- Recorded: 1983
- Studios: Perspective Sound, Sun Valley, California
- Genres: Progressive rock; hard rock; new wave; power pop
- Length: 32:11
- Label: Epitaph
- Producers: Greg Graffin; Brett Gurewitz

Bad Religion chronology
How Could Hell Be Any Worse? (1982)	Into the Unknown (1983)	Back to the Known (1985)

Into the Unknown is the second studio album by Bad Religion, released in August 1983 through Epitaph Records. The album marks a distinct departure from the band's previous album; instead of featuring hardcore punk, the album is characterized by slower tempos, use of electronic organ and pianos, and a prog-influenced hard rock sound. Into the Unknown is the only Bad Religion album to feature Paul Dedona on bass and Davy Goldman on drums. Dedona was fired from the band before their next recording and was replaced by Tim Gallegos, and former drummer Pete Finestone returned to the band in 1986. The album also features Bad Religion's longest track to date, "Time and Disregard", which is seven minutes long.

Into the Unknown proved to be the band's most controversial release: despite favorable reviews from music critics, it was a commercial failure and was characterized as a "misstep" by guitarist Brett Gurewitz. It was not reissued on any format until 2010, when it was issued on vinyl as part of the box set 30 Years of Bad Religion, and has never been reissued on its own until a 2026 pressing of 1000 limited copies.

== Background and production ==
While on tour promoting their debut studio album How Could Hell Be Any Worse? (1982), the members of Bad Religion noticed a shift in the mood of people involved in the punk rock scene in Southern California. In the lead up to the record sessions of their second album, the band members were adamant that punk is dead and decided to move on from the genre. According to author Dave Thompson in his book Alternative Rock (2000), the subsequent sessions were "fraught at the best of times and positively disastrous at the worse of times." Guitarist Brett Gurewitz stated that it was quickly produced after the release of the band's debut album because the band did not take themselves seriously and did not think it would last very long, despite the success of their debut and popularity on the underground music scene. Gurewitz said that little thought was put into the album's production.

During the sessions, bassist Jay Bentley was so outraged at vocalist Greg Graffin's over-usage of a Roland Juno-60 synthesizer that he quit the band when they were partway through recording the first track, and drummer Pete Finestone also walked out, subsequently leaving to study in England. Paul Dedona played bass in Bentley's place, while Davy Goldman filled in for Finestone on drums. Bad Religion hired producer Thom Wilson to collaborate with the band during the album's production.

== Musical style and influences ==
Gurewitz and the other band members were very much into progressive rock before getting into punk rock, and wanted to record an album reflecting a prog and avant-garde influence. The album is characterized by slower tempos and use of electronic organ and piano-driven melody. Most critics have categorized Into the Unknown as progressive rock, hard rock, new wave and power pop. Thompson described the album's sound as Graffin's "auteur keyboards colliding punk and proto-synthpop, before sailing off into distinctly softer, rockier pastures and prescient soaring harmonies."

== Release and reception ==
Professional ratings
Review scores
Source	Rating
AllMusic	4.5/5 stars
Alternative Rock	7/10
The Encyclopedia of Popular Music	3/5 stars
The Great Rock Discography	7/10
The Rolling Stone Album Guide	1/5 stars
Spin Alternative Record Guide	3/10
Ventura County Star	B+
The Village Voice	A−

Because of the band's success, they produced more copies of this album than they had of their debut. Gurewitz joked about having "[sent out] ten thousand copies and [getting] eleven thousand back." The album was a commercial failure to the point that the band and Epitaph Records, their label, disbanded.

Tim Yohannan, founder of punk zine Maximumrocknroll, called the album "slickly produced early ’70s wimp rock" and said that "After playing it, I hurled it out the window, into the unknown." In a positive review of the album, The Village Voice critic Robert Christgau said, "I find myself moved by its anthemic ambition--and achievement." John Dougan of AllMusic says that Into the Unknown is "a bit off-putting at first blush, mainly because the tempos are slower and more deliberate, and because of the use of swirling organs and pianos", while he calls it a "terrific record that was perhaps more daring than anyone realized at the time of its release." Chuck Eddy has praised the album, saying it "sounds like Hawkwind but feels way less exotic, more like how the prairie art-schlockers in Kansas and Styx always tried to feel."

== Legacy ==
Into the Unknown is Bad Religion's most controversial release. The band broke up after the album's release, but reformed in 1985. Gurewitz characterized the album as a "terrible misstep". Graffin thought it sounded like the early work of R.E.M., and that it would have been received better had it been released a couple of years later. Although Into the Unknown has never been officially released on CD, bootleg CDs of the album exist.

Graffin recalls that the band only performed material from this album once when it was released: when Bad Religion premiered the material live, only 12 people turned up for the concert after fans learned that the band was going to bring keyboards on stage. The band subsequently decided not to bring keyboards on tour with them, and to return to their hardcore punk sound. In October 2010, the band performed "Billy Gnosis", the first time in 27 years that Bad Religion had performed any songs from the album in concert. In December, the band released the vinyl box set 30 Years of Bad Religion, which reissued all 15 of the band's LPs, including Into the Unknown. The band's website offers commentaries from Greg Graffin and Brett Gurewitz. "The Dichotomy" was repeatedly played live in 2019.

As of 2025, only four songs have been played live from this album: "It's Only Over When...", "Billy Gnosis", "The Dichotomy" and "...You Give Up".

== Track listing ==
All tracks are written by Greg Graffin, except where noted.

Side one
No.	Title	Writer(s)	Length
1.	"It's Only Over When…"		3:36
2.	"Chasing the Wild Goose"	Brett Gurewitz	2:50
3.	"Billy Gnosis"	Gurewitz	3:31
4.	"Time and Disregard": "Part I"; "Part II"; "Part III"; "Part IV"		7:02: 1:19; 1:48; 1:58; 1:57

Side two
No.	Title	Writer(s)	Length
5.	"The Dichotomy"	Gurewitz	4:52
6.	"Million Days"		3:47
7.	"Losing Generation"		3:37
8.	"…You Give Up"		2:55
Total length:			32:11

== Personnel ==
Adapted from the album liner notes.

Bad Religion

- Greg Graffin – lead vocals, keyboards (tracks 1 and 2), synthesizer (tracks 3–5, 7 and 8), piano (tracks 3, 4, 6 and 8), acoustic guitar (tracks 4 and 6), backing vocals (tracks 1, 3 and 4), production
- Brett Gurewitz – electric guitars, acoustic guitar (on "Chasing The Wild Goose"), backing vocals (on "Chasing The Wild Goose"), production
- Paul Dedona – bass
- Davy Goldman – drums, wood block (on "Chasing The Wild Goose")

Technical personnel

- Jim Mankey – engineering
- Ron Russell – cover art
- Lynda Le Cons – graphic design, art direction
