= Jay Bentley =

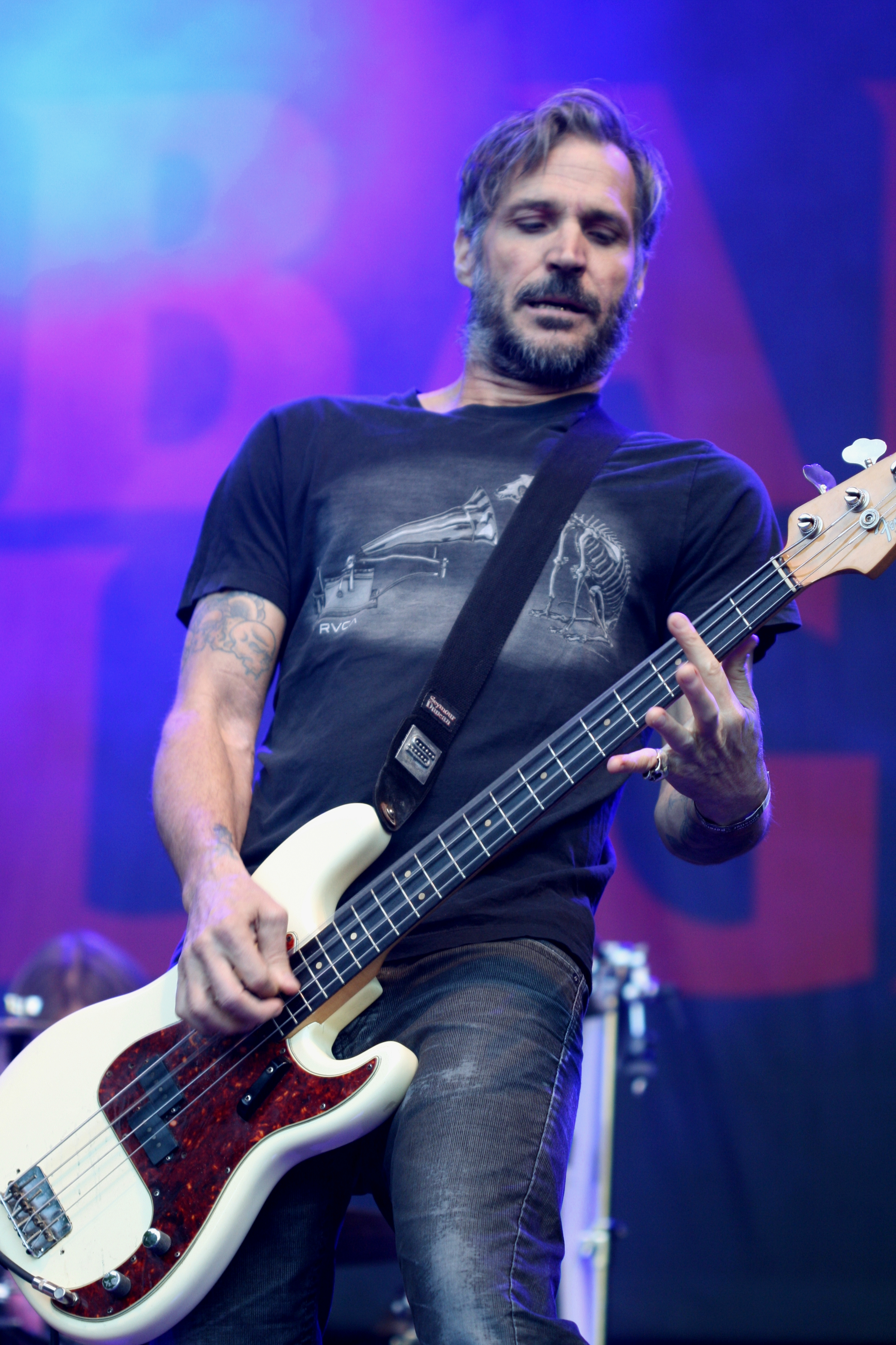
- Bentley playing with Bad Religion in 2013.

Background information
- Born: June 6, 1964 (age 61); Wichita, Kansas, U.S.
- Origin: Santa Clarita, California, U.S.
- Genres: Punk rock
- Occupation: Musician
- Instruments: Bass guitar; guitar; vocals
- Years active: 1979–present
- Labels: Epitaph; Atlantic; ANTI-

Jayson Dee Bentley (born June 6, 1964) is an American bassist and co-founding member of the punk rock group Bad Religion. He has played with the band through its whole existence with a small break between 1983 and 1985. Along with vocalist Greg Graffin, Bentley has appeared on nearly all of Bad Religion's studio albums, with the sole exception being their second album Into the Unknown (1983).

== Career ==
Jay Bentley grew up in Santa Clarita, California, and later moved to Woodland Hills. As with guitarist Brett Gurewitz and lead singer Greg Graffin, he was a student of El Camino Real High School. He played in Bad Religion for three years (1980–1983), and left while the band was in the midst of writing and recording their second album, Into the Unknown.

Bentley was a onetime member of such notable L.A. groups as Wasted Youth, T.S.O.L., The Circle Jerks and Cathedral Of Tears. He rejoined Bad Religion in late 1985 while the How Could Hell Be Any Worse? line-up – adding Circle Jerks' Greg Hetson as the band's second guitarist – was reuniting to record the first three reunion albums, Suffer, No Control and Against the Grain, which are often considered their best releases. Today, Bentley continues touring and recording with Bad Religion. He has appeared on every Bad Religion release, with the exceptions of Into the Unknown (1983) and the Back to the Known (1985) EP. The band's most recent studio album, Age of Unreason, was recorded in 2018 and 2019, with a May 1, 2019 release. Since the early 2010s, Bentley has been the regular touring member of Me First And The Gimme Gimmes filling in on bass and backup vocals for Fat Mike.

== Personal life ==
Bentley has two sons: Miles (born 1991), who played bass in Dave Hause and The Mermaid, and Hunter (born 1993). He also has a daughter named Peribeau and a son named Dragon and lives with his wife Natalia Fabia in Costa Mesa, California.

In the past, Bentley has had struggles with alcoholism. He first quit drinking in 1990 but relapsed in 1998. Since 2005, he is completely alcohol abstinent.

== Equipment ==
Bentley's main basses have been Fender models for most of his career in Bad Religion, primarily a black and/or white Precision models; in recent years, however, he has been an endorser of Epiphone and has his own Jack Casady signature. Bentley often plays bass with a pick.
