= List of Bad Religion members =

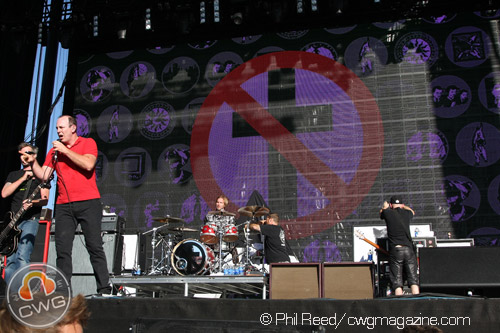
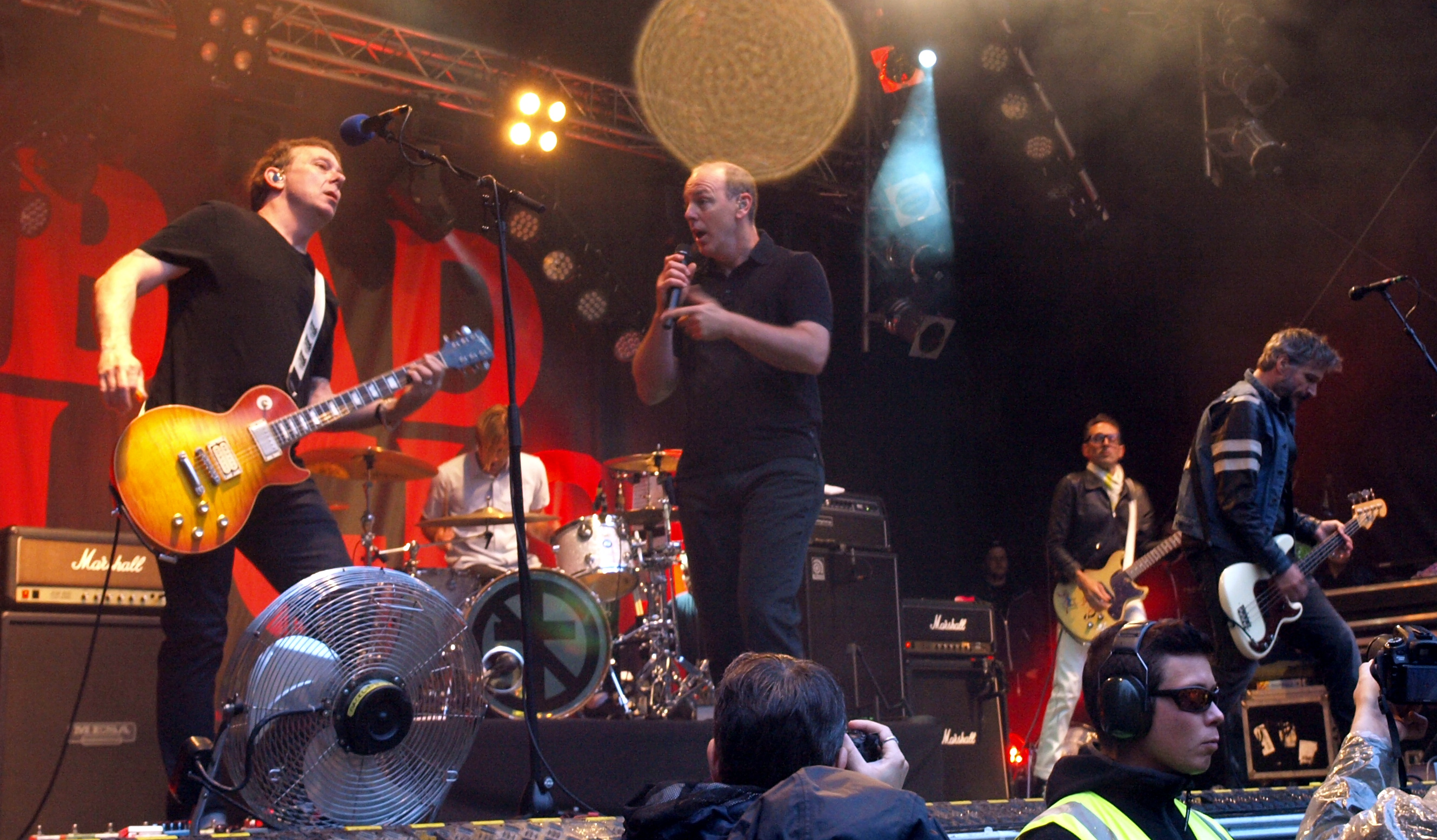
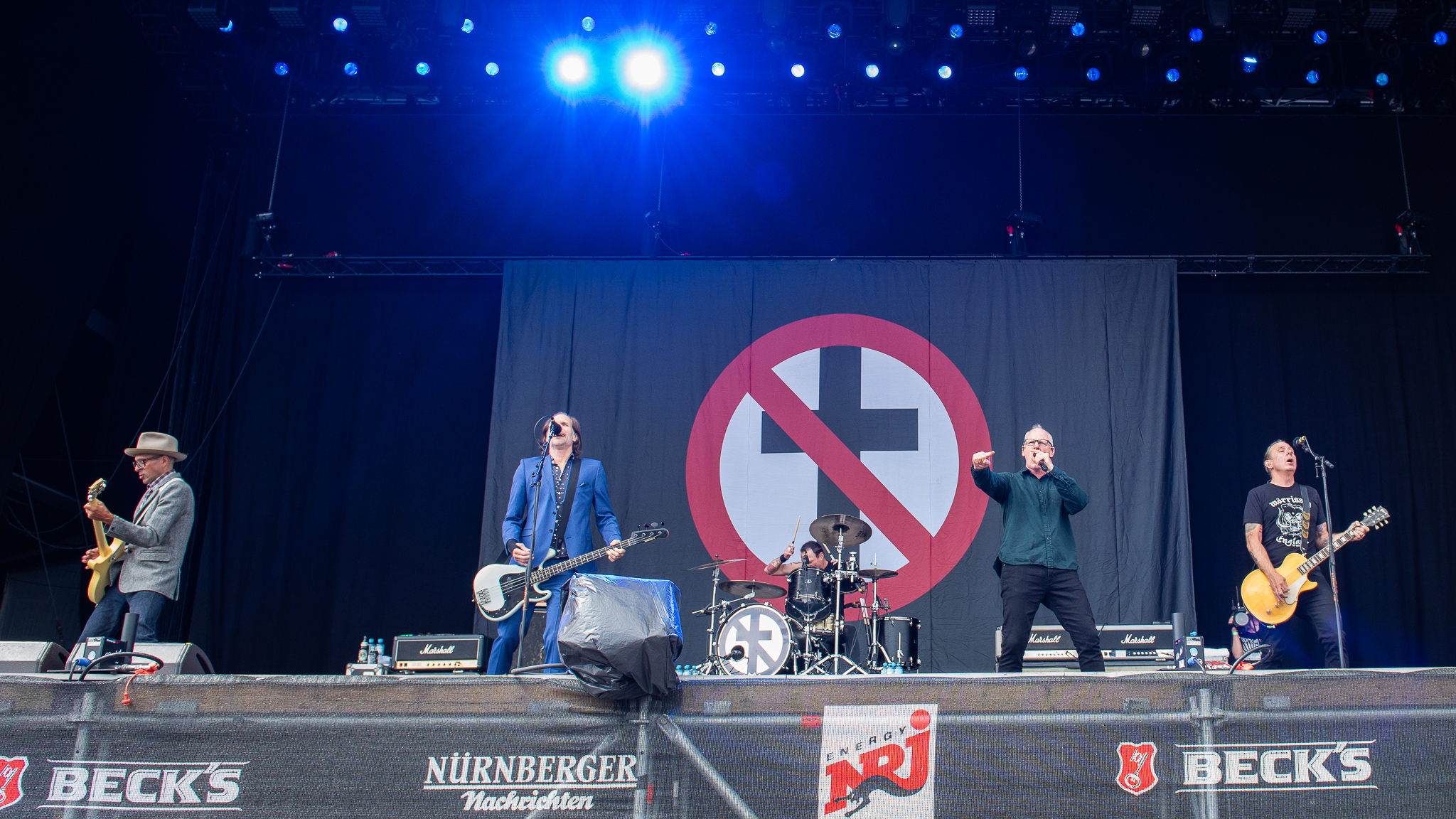
Three line-ups of Bad Religion performing in 2010, 2013 and 2018.

Bad Religion is an American punk rock band from Los Angeles, California. Formed in 1980, the group originally included vocalist Greg Graffin, guitarist Brett Gurewitz, bassist Jay Bentley and drummer Jay Ziskrout. The band consists of Graffin, Gurewitz (who does not tour) and Bentley, alongside guitarists Brian Baker (since 1994) and Mike Dimkich (since 2013) and drummer Jamie Miller (since 2015).

== History ==
Ziskrout left the band halfway through the recording of their debut full-length album How Could Hell Be Any Worse? and was replaced for the rest of the sessions by Pete Finestone. 1983's Into the Unknown featured bassist Paul Dedona and Davy Goldman, both of whom left after the album was released. Bad Religion briefly broke up in 1984, as Gurewitz left the band to focus on his record label Epitaph Records and recording studio Westbeach Recorders, before returning with guitarist Greg Hetson, bassist Tim Gallegos and drummer Finestone for the 1985 EP Back to the Known.

Bentley and later Gurewitz returned to Bad Religion in 1986, with the five-piece lineup releasing three albums in three years before Finestone left again in 1991. He was replaced by Bobby Schayer, whose first album with the band was Generator in 1992. After Bad Religion signed to Atlantic Records and released Stranger than Fiction in 1994, Gurewitz left the band again. Shortly after the album's release, Brian Baker took Gurewitz's place in the group. After three more albums, Schayer departed the band in 2001 due to a shoulder injury, and was replaced by Brooks Wackerman. Around the same time, Gurewitz returned to the band for a third time. Longtime guitarist Hetson left in 2013 and was replaced by Mike Dimkich, and in 2016 Jamie Miller replaced Wackerman after he joined Avenged Sevenfold.

== Members ==
=== Current ===
Image	Name	Years active	Instruments	Release contributions
	Greg Graffin	1980–1984; 1984–present	lead vocals; keyboards; piano; acoustic guitar	all Bad Religion releases
	Brett Gurewitz	1980–1984; 1988–1994; 2001–present (inactive on tours since 2001)	guitar; backing vocals	all Bad Religion releases from Bad Religion (1981) to Into the Unknown (1983), from Suffer (1988) to Stranger than Fiction (1994), and from The Process of Belief (2002) to present
	Jay Bentley	1980–1982; 1986–present	bass; backing vocals	all Bad Religion releases except Into the Unknown (1983) and Back to the Known (1985)
	Brian Baker	1994–present	guitar; backing vocals	all Bad Religion releases from The Gray Race (1996) to present
	Mike Dimkich	2013–present	guitar	all Bad Religion releases from Age of Unreason (2019) to present
	Jamie Miller	2016–present	drums	all Bad Religion releases from Age of Unreason (2019) to present

=== Former ===
Image	Name	Years active	Instruments	Release contributions
	Jay Ziskrout	1980	drums	Bad Religion (1981); How Could Hell Be Any Worse? (1982)
	Pete Finestone	1981–1982; 1984–1987; 1988–1991	drums	How Could Hell Be Any Worse? (1982); Back to the Known (1985); Suffer (1988); No Control (1989); Against the Grain (1990)
	Paul Dedona	1982–1984	bass	Into the Unknown (1983)
	Davy Goldman	1982–1984	drums	Into the Unknown (1983)
	Greg Hetson	1984–2013	guitar; occasional backing vocals	all Bad Religion releases from Back to the Known (1985) to True North (2013)
	Tim Gallegos	1984–1985	bass	Back to the Known (1985)
	John Albert	1984–1985	drums	none
	Lucky Lehrer	1987	drums	none
	Bobby Schayer	1991–2001	drums	all Bad Religion releases from Generator (1992) to The New America (2000)
	Brooks Wackerman	2001–2015	drums	all Bad Religion releases from The Process of Belief (2002) to Christmas Songs (2013)

== Lineups ==
Period	Members	Releases
Mid – late 1980	Greg Graffin – lead vocals; Brett Gurewitz – guitar, backing vocals; Jay Bentley – bass, backing vocals; Jay Ziskrout – drums	Bad Religion (1981); How Could Hell Be Any Worse? (1982)
January 1981 – late 1982	Greg Graffin – lead vocals; Brett Gurewitz – guitar, backing vocals; Jay Bentley – bass, backing vocals; Pete Finestone – drums	How Could Hell Be Any Worse? (1982)
Late 1982 – early 1984	Greg Graffin – lead vocals, keyboards, acoustic guitar; Brett Gurewitz – electric guitar, backing vocals; Paul Dedona – bass; Davy Goldman – drums	Into the Unknown (1983)
Band inactive early – late 1984
Late 1984 – mid-1985	Greg Graffin – vocals; Greg Hetson – guitar; Tim Gallegos – bass; Pete Finestone – drums	Back to the Known (1985)
Band inactive mid-1985 – early 1986
Early 1986 – September 1987	Greg Graffin – lead vocals; Greg Hetson – guitar; Jay Bentley – bass, backing vocals; Pete Finestone – drums	none
September 1987 – early 1988	Greg Graffin – lead vocals; Greg Hetson – guitar; Jay Bentley – bass, backing vocals; Lucky Lehrer – drums	none
Early 1988 – April 1991	Greg Graffin – lead vocals; Brett Gurewitz – guitar, backing vocals; Greg Hetson – guitar; Jay Bentley – bass, backing vocals; Pete Finestone – drums	Suffer (1988); No Control (1989); Against the Grain (1990)
April 1991 – summer 1994	Greg Graffin – lead vocals; Brett Gurewitz – guitar, backing vocals; Greg Hetson – guitar; Jay Bentley – bass, backing vocals; Bobby Schayer – drums, percussion	Generator (1992); Recipe for Hate (1993); Stranger than Fiction (1994)
Summer 1994 – May 2001	Greg Graffin – lead vocals; Greg Hetson – guitar; Brian Baker – guitar, backing vocals; Jay Bentley – bass, backing vocals; Bobby Schayer – drums, percussion	The Gray Race (1996); Tested (1997); No Substance (1998); The New America (2000)
May – June 2001	Greg Graffin – lead vocals; Brett Gurewitz – guitar, backing vocals (inactive on tours); Greg Hetson – guitar; Brian Baker – guitar, backing vocals; Jay Bentley – bass, backing vocals; Bobby Schayer – drums, percussion	none
June 2001 – April 2013	Greg Graffin – lead vocals; Brett Gurewitz – guitar, backing vocals (inactive on tours); Greg Hetson – guitar; Brian Baker – guitar, backing vocals; Jay Bentley – bass, backing vocals; Brooks Wackerman – drums, percussion	The Process of Belief (2002); The Empire Strikes First (2004); New Maps of Hell (2007); 30 Years Live (2010); The Dissent of Man (2010); True North (2013)
April 2013 – October 2015	Greg Graffin – lead vocals; Brett Gurewitz – guitar, backing vocals (inactive on tours); Brian Baker – guitar, backing vocals; Mike Dimkich – guitar; Jay Bentley – bass, backing vocals; Brooks Wackerman – drums, percussion	none
February 2016 – present	Greg Graffin – lead vocals; Brett Gurewitz – guitar, backing vocals (inactive on tours); Brian Baker – guitar, backing vocals; Mike Dimkich – guitar; Jay Bentley – bass, backing vocals; Jamie Miller – drums, percussion, backing vocals	Age of Unreason (2019)
