= Bad Religion discography =

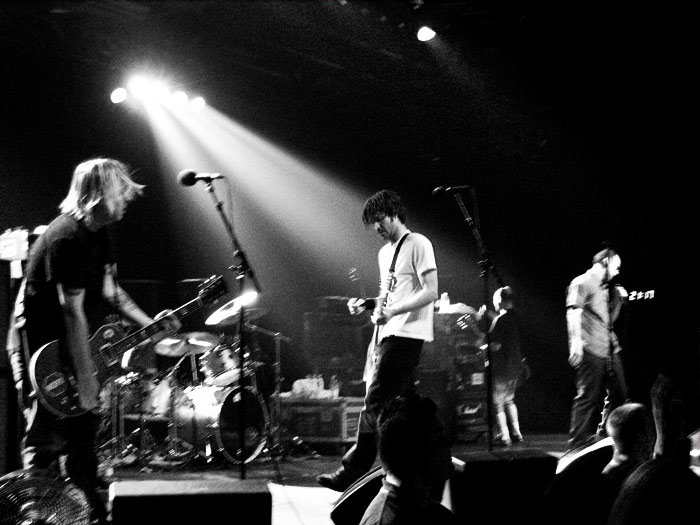
- Bad Religion performing live in 2004
- Studio albums: 17
- Extended plays: 2
- Live albums: 2
- Compilation albums: 4
- Singles: 29
- Video albums: 5
- Music videos: 25

The discography of Bad Religion, an American punk rock band, consists of 17 studio albums, two live albums, four compilation albums, one box set, two extended plays (EPs), 29 singles, five video albums and 25 music videos. Formed in Los Angeles, California, in 1980, the band originally featured vocalist Greg Graffin, guitarist Brett Gurewitz, bassist Jay Bentley and drummer Jay Ziskrout, who released their self-titled debut EP in February 1981 on Gurewitz's label Epitaph Records. Pete Finestone replaced Ziskrout before the release of the band's full-length debut album, How Could Hell Be Any Worse?, in 1982. The following year's Into the Unknown featured bassist Paul Dedona and drummer Davy Goldman, before Bentley and Finestone returned to the band and Greg Hetson joined as second guitarist.

After a brief hiatus, Bad Religion returned with three albums in three years – Suffer in 1988, No Control in 1989 and Against the Grain in 1990 – before Finestone left again and was replaced by Bobby Schayer. 1992's Generator charted in the top 50 in Germany, while its 1993 follow-up, Recipe for Hate, reached the top 40. After signing with major label Atlantic Records, Bad Religion released its final album with Gurewitz before his departure, Stranger than Fiction. The album was the band's first commercial success, reaching number 87 on the Billboard 200, and receiving gold certifications from the Recording Industry Association of America (RIAA) and Music Canada. Three singles from the album reached the Billboard Alternative Songs (then the Hot Modern Rock Tracks chart) top 40.

After adding Brian Baker as Gurewitz's replacement, the band released three more albums on Atlantic – The Gray Race (1996), No Substance (1998) and The New America (2000) – all of which reached the Billboard 200 top 100. Gurewitz returned and Brooks Wackerman replaced Schayer in 2001, with this lineup's first album, The Process of Belief (2002), being the band's first to reach the US top 50. The Empire Strikes First (2004) reached the top 40, while the single "Los Angeles Is Burning" reached number 40 on the Alternative Songs chart and number three on the UK Rock & Metal Singles Chart. New Maps of Hell (2007) and The Dissent of Man (2010) both reached number 35, while True North (2013) peaked at number 19. Also in 2013, the band released an EP of Christmas music titled Christmas Songs that reached number 101 on the Billboard 200. Bad Religion did not release another full-length studio album, Age of Unreason, until 2019.

== Albums ==
=== Studio albums ===
List of studio albums, with selected chart positions and certifications
Title	Album details	Peak chart positions										Certifications
Title	Album details	US	AUT	CAN	FIN	GER	JPN	NED	SWE	SWI	UK	Certifications
How Could Hell Be Any Worse?	Released: January 19, 1982; Label: Epitaph; Formats: CD, LP, CS	—	—	—	—	—	—	—	—	—	—	
Into the Unknown	Released: August 19, 1983; Label: Epitaph; Formats: LP	—	—	—	—	—	—	—	—	—	—	
Suffer	Released: September 8, 1988; Label: Epitaph; Formats: CD, LP, CS	—	—	—	—	—	—	—	—	—	—	
No Control	Released: November 2, 1989; Label: Epitaph; Formats: CD, LP, CS	—	—	—	—	—	—	—	—	—	—	
Against the Grain	Released: November 23, 1990; Label: Epitaph; Formats: CD, LP, CS	—	—	—	—	—	—	—	—	—	—	
Generator	Released: March 13, 1992; Label: Epitaph; Formats: CD, LP, CS	—	—	—	—	49	—	—	—	—	—	
Recipe for Hate	Released: September 21, 1993; Label: Atlantic; Formats: CD, LP, CS	—	—	—	—	34	—	—	—	—	—	
Stranger Than Fiction	Released: September 6, 1994; Label: Atlantic; Formats: CD, LP, CS	87	27	—	—	6	—	—	6	28	—	CAN: Gold; SWE: Gold; US: Gold
The Gray Race	Released: February 27, 1996; Label: Atlantic; Formats: CD, LP, CS	56	15	41	2	11	—	61	6	21	102	FIN: Gold
No Substance	Released: May 5, 1998; Label: Atlantic; Formats: CD, LP, CS	78	18	68	17	28	—	—	54	—	—	
The New America	Released: May 9, 2000; Label: Atlantic; Formats: CD, LP, CS	88	47	—	38	16	—	—	53	69	—	
The Process of Belief	Released: January 22, 2002; Label: Epitaph; Formats: CD, LP	49	41	27	35	13	—	—	39	37	136	
The Empire Strikes First	Released: June 8, 2004; Label: Epitaph; Formats: CD, LP	40	—	—	—	28	—	99	42	82	122	
New Maps of Hell	Released: July 10, 2007; Label: Epitaph; Formats: CD, LP	35	64	—	29	37	53	—	41	49	134	
The Dissent of Man	Released: September 28, 2010; Label: Epitaph; Formats: CD, LP, DL	35	61	27	43	33	46	—	56	79	135	
True North	Released: January 22, 2013; Label: Epitaph; Formats: CD, LP, DL	19	27	14	5	10	56	86	31	14	129	
Age of Unreason	Released: May 3, 2019; Label: Epitaph; Formats: CD, LP, DL	73	15	—	12	8	56	—	58	16	143	

=== Live albums ===
List of studio albums, with selected chart positions
Title	Album details	Peak chart positions							
Title	Album details	US Hard	US Indie	US Net	US Rock	US Vinyl	AUT	FIN	GER
Tested	Released: February 1997; Label: Dragnet/Epic; Formats: CD, 2LP, CS	—	—	—	—	—	49	25	74
30 Years Live	Released: May 18, 2010; Label: Epitaph; Format: DL	19	30	16	49	7	—	—	—

=== Compilations ===
List of compilation albums, with selected chart positions
Title	Album details	Peak chart positions									
Title	Album details	US	US Alt.	US Hard	US Holi.	US Indie	US Rock	US Taste	US Vinyl	FIN	JPN
80–85	Released: November 12, 1991; Label: Epitaph; Formats: CD, CS	—	—	—	—	—	—	—	—	—	—
All Ages	Released: November 7, 1995; Label: Epitaph; Formats: CD, CS	—	—	—	—	—	—	—	—	20	—
Punk Rock Songs: The Epic Years	Released: April 3, 2002; Label: Epic; Format: CD	—	—	—	—	—	—	—	—	—	—

=== Box sets ===
List of box sets
Title	Album details
Bad Religion	Released: November 30, 2010; Label: Epitaph; Format: 15LP

== Extended plays ==
List of extended plays
Title	EP details
Bad Religion	Released: February 1981; Label: Epitaph; Format: 7" vinyl
Back to the Known	Released: April 12, 1985; Label: Epitaph; Format: 12" vinyl
Christmas Songs	Released: October 29, 2013; Label: Epitaph; Formats: CD, LP, DL

== Singles ==
List of singles, with selected chart positions, showing year released and album name
Title	Year	Peak chart positions										Album
Title	Year	US Alt.	US Main.	US Rock	AUS	FIN	GER	SWE	UK	UK Indie	UK Rock	Album
"Atomic Garden"	1991	—	—	—	—	—	—	—	—	—	—	Generator
"American Jesus"	1993	—	—	—	—	—	—	—	—	—	—	Recipe for Hate
"Struck a Nerve"	1993	—	—	—	—	—	—	—	—	—	—	Recipe for Hate
"Lookin' In"	1993	—	—	—	—	—	—	—	—	—	—	Recipe for Hate
"Stranger than Fiction"	1994	28	—	—	115	—	—	—	—	—	—	Stranger than Fiction
"Infected"	1994	27	33	—	—	—	—	—	—	—	—	Stranger than Fiction
"21st Century (Digital Boy)"	1995	11	—	—	112	—	—	23	41	—	16	Stranger than Fiction
"Incomplete"	1995	—	—	—	—	—	—	—	—	—	—	Stranger than Fiction
"A Walk"	1996	34	38	—	—	—	—	—	—	—	—	The Gray Race
"Punk Rock Song"	1996	—	—	—	191	5	29	21	—	—	—	The Gray Race
"The Streets of America"	1996	—	—	—	—	—	—	—	—	—	—	The Gray Race
"Dream of Unity"	1997	—	—	—	—	—	—	—	—	—	—	Tested
"Raise Your Voice" (Bad Religion with Campino)	1998	—	—	—	—	—	—	—	—	—	—	No Substance
"Shades of Truth"	1998	—	—	—	—	—	—	—	—	—	—	No Substance
"New America"	2000	—	—	—	—	—	—	—	—	—	—	The New America
"I Love My Computer"	2000	—	—	—	—	—	—	—	—	—	—	The New America
"Sorrow"	2001	35	—	—	—	—	—	—	—	—	—	The Process of Belief
"Broken"	2002	—	—	—	—	—	—	—	125	—	12	The Process of Belief
"The Defense"	2002	—	—	—	—	—	—	—	—	—	—	The Process of Belief
"Los Angeles Is Burning"	2004	40	—	—	—	—	—	—	67	11	3	The Empire Strikes First
"The Empire Strikes First"	2004	—	—	—	—	—	—	—	—	—	—	The Empire Strikes First
"Honest Goodbye"	2007	—	—	—	—	—	—	—	—	—	—	New Maps of Hell
"New Dark Ages"	2007	—	—	—	—	—	—	—	—	—	—	New Maps of Hell
"The Devil in Stitches"	2010	39	—	38	—	—	—	—	—	—	—	The Dissent of Man
"Cyanide"	2010	—	—	—	—	—	—	—	—	—	—	The Dissent of Man
"Wrong Way Kids"	2011	—	—	—	—	—	—	—	—	—	—	The Dissent of Man
"Fuck You"	2012	—	—	—	—	—	—	—	—	—	—	True North
"True North"	2013	—	—	—	—	—	—	—	—	—	—	True North
"Father Christmas"	2013	—	—	—	—	—	—	—	—	—	—	non-album single
"The Kids Are Alt-Right"	2018	—	—	—	—	—	—	—	—	—	—	non-album single
"The Profane Rights of Man"	2018	—	—	—	—	—	—	—	—	—	—	non-album single
"My Sanity"	2018	—	—	—	—	—	—	—	—	—	—	Age of Unreason
"Chaos From Within"	2019	—	—	—	—	—	—	—	—	—	—	Age of Unreason
"Faith Alone 2020"	2020	—	—	—	—	—	—	—	—	—	—	non-album single
"What Are We Standing For"	2020	—	—	—	—	—	—	—	—	—	—	non-album single
"Emancipation Of The Mind"	2021	—	—	—	—	—	—	—	—	—	—	non-album single
"—" denotes releases that did not chart or were not released in that market.

== Videos ==
=== Video albums ===
List of video albums, with selected chart positions
Title	Album details	Peak
Title	Album details	US
Along the Way	Released: August 25, 1990; Label: Tribal Video/Epitaph; Format: VHS/DVD	—
Big Bang	Released: 1992; Label: Tribal Video; Format: VHS	—
The Riot	Released: August 29, 2000; Label: Music Video Distribution; Format: DVD	—
Punk Rock Songs: The Epic Years	Released: 2004; Label: Sony; Format: DVD	—
Live at the Palladium	Released: March 7, 2006; Label: Epitaph; Format: DVD	18

=== Music videos ===
List of music video, showing year released and directors names
Title	Year	Director(s)	Ref.
"Do What You Want"	1988	unknown	
"Atomic Garden"	1992	Gore Verbinski	
"American Jesus"	1993	Gore Verbinski	
"Struck a Nerve"	1993	Darren Lavett	
"Stranger than Fiction"	1994	Gore Verbinski	
"21st Century (Digital Boy)"	1994	Gore Verbinski	
"Infected" (first version)	1995	Carlos Grasso	
"Infected" (second version)	1995	Darren Lavett	
"Incomplete"	1995	Simeon Soffer	
"A Walk"	1996	David Bragger	
"Punk Rock Song"	1996	David Bragger	
"The Streets of America"	1996	David Bragger	
"Ten in 2010"	1996	Francis Lawrence	
"Dream of Unity"	1997	unknown	
"Raise Your Voice"	1998	Kai Sehr	
"New America"	2000	Evan Bernard	
"Sorrow"	2002	Boo!	
"Broken"	2002	Boo!	
"Los Angeles Is Burning"	2004	Lightborne	
"New Dark Ages"	2007	Michael Pinkney, Michael Reich	
"Honest Goodbye"	2007	Lex Halaby	
"Wrong Way Kids"	2011	Nicole Vaskell	
"True North"	2013	Zach Merck	
"The Kids Are Alt-Right"	2018	Antoni Sendra PODENCO	
"The Profane Rights of Man"	2018	unknown	
"Do the Paranoid Style"	2019	Dan Fusselman	
