= 30 Years Live =

Live album by Bad Religion
- Released: May 18, 2010
- Recorded: March 17 – April 17, 2010
- Venue: House of Blues, Los Angeles; House of Blues, Las Vegas; House of Blues, Anaheim
- Studio: Sunset Lodge Studio, Los Angeles
- Genre: Punk rock
- Length: 41:54
- Label: Epitaph
- Producer: Bad Religion

Bad Religion chronology
New Maps of Hell (2007)	30 Years Live (2010)	The Dissent of Man (2010)

30 Years Live is the second live album from the band Bad Religion, which was released on May 18, 2010, therein documenting the band's 30th anniversary tour. It is the band's first live album in 13 years, since Tested in 1997. Rather than a standard release, it was originally available for free download to members of Bad Religion's official mailing list.

The Bad Religion albums that do not have songs represented in this album are the Bad Religion EP, Into the Unknown, Back to the Known, No Control, No Substance, The New America and The Process of Belief, even though songs from some of those albums were performed live on the 30th anniversary tour.

== Background ==
On March 4, 2010, it was announced on the band's website that they would be recording a new live album during their spring tour of 2010. The official quote from the website reads:

"To celebrate three decades of Bad Religion, we'll be recording a live album during our spring 2010 tour, and offering it as a free "thank you" to the loyal fans who've been with us through all the sweat and mayhem. So let us know who you are by joining our mailing list below, and sometime late spring we'll let you know how you can get your free Bad Religion 30 Years Live download. We'll be playing a few tracks at the shows from our new album, coming this fall, so this will be a great way to get a preview of the new tunes.
Thanks again to the greatest and best-looking fans a band could hope for."

The song "Won't Somebody" was previously released as an acoustic bonus track on the New Maps of Hell Deluxe Edition. An electric version was later featured on their 2010 studio album, The Dissent of Man. A studio version of "Resist-Stance" also later appeared on The Dissent of Man.

To commemorate their 30 years as a band, Bad Religion planned a 30-song set each night. According to Graffin, this went against their long-held belief that "punk shows shouldn't be longer than an hour". This 30-song set included standard openings and encores with various songs played between. The same set was never played twice. Despite playing 30 songs live in all but one concert, the album includes only 17 tracks.

The album was recorded in spring 2010 at the House of Blues in Hollywood, Las Vegas, and Anaheim, with additional recording done at Sunset Lodge Studio in Silver Lake, Los Angeles. It was mixed at The Warehouse Studio in Vancouver, Canada.

== Release ==
The live album has not been sold in stores. Instead, it was released as a free download for fans who had signed up on the mailing list at the band's website.

On March 8, 2010, it was announced on the Epitaph Blog that the album would be released on May 18, 2010, for a short period only.

In 2016 the album was released on vinyl.

== Tour dates ==
- Anaheim, California – House of Blues – March 17, 2010
- Anaheim, California – House of Blues – March 18, 2010
- San Diego, California – House of Blues – March 19, 2010
- San Diego, California – House of Blues – March 20, 2010
- San Diego, California – House of Blues – March 21, 2010
- Los Angeles, California – House of Blues – March 24, 2010
- Los Angeles, California – House of Blues – March 25, 2010
- Las Vegas, Nevada – House of Blues – March 26, 2010
- Las Vegas, Nevada – House of Blues – March 27, 2010
- Anaheim, California – House of Blues – March 31, 2010
- Anaheim, California – House of Blues – April 1, 2010
- Anaheim, California – House of Blues – April 2, 2010
- Los Angeles, California – House of Blues – April 3, 2010
- Los Angeles, California – House of Blues – April 4, 2010
- Anaheim, California – House of Blues – April 8, 2010
- Anaheim, California – House of Blues – April 9, 2010
- Los Angeles, California – House of Blues – April 10, 2010
- Anaheim, California – House of Blues – April 15, 2010
- Los Angeles, California – House of Blues – April 16, 2010
- Los Angeles, California – House of Blues – April 17, 2010

== Track listing ==
Songwriting credits adapted from the album liner notes.

All tracks are written by Greg Graffin and Brett Gurewitz, except where noted.

No.	Title	Writer(s)	Length
1.	"Fuck Armageddon...This Is Hell"	Graffin	3:18
2.	"Dearly Beloved"		2:14
3.	"Suffer"		1:55
4.	"Man With a Mission"	Gurewitz, Russ Tolman	3:32
5.	"New Dark Ages"		2:42
6.	"Germs of Perfection"		1:31
7.	"Marked"	Gurewitz	2:07
8.	"A Walk"	Graffin	2:31
9.	"Flat Earth Society"	Gurewitz	2:27
10.	"The Resist Stance"		2:24
11.	"American Jesus"		3:11
12.	"Social Suicide"		1:35
13.	"Atheist Peace"		1:40
14.	"Tomorrow"	Graffin	1:57
15.	"Won't Somebody"		3:02
16.	"Los Angeles Is Burning"		3:20
17.	"We're Only Gonna Die"	Graffin	2:29

== Personnel ==
Adapted from the album liner notes.

=== Bad Religion ===
- Greg Graffin – vocals
- Brett Gurewitz – guitar, backing vocals
- Brian Baker – guitar, backing vocals
- Greg Hetson – guitar
- Jay Bentley – bass, backing vocals
- Brooks Wackerman – drums

=== Technical ===
- Ron Kimball – recording
- Matt Neth – recording
- Andrew Heilprin – recording
- Chris Rakestraw – additional engineering
- Mike Fraser – mixing
- Dave Collins – mastering
- Nick Pritchard – cover art
- Jason Link – layout
- Gary Leonard – photography

== Charts ==
Chart (2010)	Peak position
US Independent Albums (Billboard)	30
US Top Hard Rock Albums (Billboard)	19
US Top Rock Albums (Billboard)	49
