= Age of Unreason (album) =

Studio album by Bad Religion
- Released: May 3, 2019
- Recorded: 2018–2019
- Studio: Sunset Sound, Hollywood, California
- Genre: Punk rock
- Length: 38:10
- Label: Epitaph
- Producer: Carlos de la Garza; Brett Gurewitz; Greg Graffin

Bad Religion chronology
Christmas Songs (2013)	Age of Unreason (2019)

Singles from Age of Unreason
- 1. "My Sanity" Released: November 13, 2018; 2. "Chaos from Within" Released: February 26, 2019; 3. "Do the Paranoid Style" Released: March 26, 2019

Age of Unreason is the seventeenth studio album by American punk rock band Bad Religion, released on May 3, 2019. It is the band's first studio album to feature guitarist Mike Dimkich and drummer Jamie Miller, replacing Greg Hetson and Brooks Wackerman respectively, and the first one to be produced by Carlos de la Garza, thus ending their collaboration with Joe Barresi, who had produced, mixed or engineered every Bad Religion album since 2004's The Empire Strikes First; Barresi did, however, mix "The Kids Are Alt-Right", which had already been released as a one-off single in 2018.

The release of Age of Unreason also marks the longest gap between studio albums in Bad Religion's entire career, with their previous album, True North, having been released in January 2013. Singles released from the album were "My Sanity", "Chaos from Within" and "Do the Paranoid Style".

== Background ==
Bad Religion's intention for their seventeenth studio album was revealed by guitarist Brett Gurewitz about ten months after the release of True North, who said, "We'll play some shows next year, not heavily. I think 2014 will be when we start writing the next album, too." By early 2015, Gurewitz and vocalist Greg Graffin had begun writing songs for the album, and plans were made to enter the studio that fall. However, it appeared plans had changed, as Graffin stated in a September 2015 interview with Glide Magazine that he had been working on his first solo album since 2006's Cold as the Clay, and Bad Religion did not have plans to release another album until at least late 2016.

Graffin later stated that plans were made to begin writing the seventeenth Bad Religion album after the release of this third solo album Millport, which was eventually released on March 10, 2017. He was quoted as saying, "During the fall semester I'm pretty busy. But next year there's going to be a new solo album. I put out a new solo album about every six years, so next year I'm due for one. And then I'm going to develop a new book, but I can't talk about it yet. And finally, Bad Religion has a new album to write. So we've got a lot of work to do." Asked in a March 2017 interview about the follow-up to True North, Graffin said, "It's one of the great challenges as artist is to maintain the tradition of his or her prior work. That's hard to do. It normally takes (Bad Religion) two years to put out an album. Why has it taken us four years to release an album after True North? Well, True North was such a great album – and we owe it to our fans to take it seriously as a great album – that to do another one is going to take a lot more work."

On February 14, 2018, Graffin posted a picture of himself with Gurewitz in the studio on Twitter, and tweeted, "New songs in the pipeline"; the post indicated that Bad Religion was in the studio working on the album. Speculation resurfaced in April of that year when Gurewitz and Baker posted pictures from the studio on their respective Instagram accounts. On June 20, 2018, the band released their first single in five years "The Kids Are Alt-Right".

Despite earlier reports that Bad Religion had been in the studio by mid-2018, and the fact that they had released one new song, Gurewitz told Los Angeles Times in July 2018 that, "We're writing for a new album, recording this fall or late summer. No release date announced yet, but we should have an album's worth of 'Fuck Trump' songs pretty soon. It's exactly what we need." On February 26, 2019, Bad Religion announced Age of Unreason as the title of the new album, its release date, and premiered the lead single "Chaos from Within". The third track, "Do the Paranoid Style", was released on March 26, 2019.

The CD version of the album features the two previously released non-album singles "The Kids Are Alt-Right" (as the band's first ever hidden track after "What Tomorrow Brings") and "The Profane Rights of Man" as bonus tracks.

== Critical reception ==
Professional ratings
Aggregate scores
Source	Rating
Metacritic	78/100
Review scores
Source	Rating
AllMusic	3.5/5 stars
PopMatters	7/10
Under the Radar	7.5/10

"Age of Unreason" received generally favourable reviews upon release. Wall of Sound gave the album a 9/10 stating: "Since their formation in 1980 the band have been challenging their listeners with music that appeal to their fans humanity, reason and conscience. Age of Unreason continues these themes, focusing on the current political climate." Loudwire named it one of the 50 best rock albums of 2019.

== Track listing ==
All tracks are written by Brett Gurewitz and Greg Graffin, except where noted.

Age of Unreason track listing
No.	Title	Writer(s)	Length
1.	"Chaos from Within"		1:50
2.	"My Sanity"		2:58
3.	"Do the Paranoid Style"		1:45
4.	"The Approach"		2:25
5.	"Lose Your Head"		2:50
6.	"End of History"	Gurewitz, Graffin, Carlos de la Garza	2:47
7.	"Age of Unreason"		2:40
8.	"Candidate"		2:45
9.	"Faces of Grief"	Gurewitz, Graffin, Brian Baker	1:04
10.	"Old Regime"		2:42
11.	"Big Black Dog"		2:06
12.	"Downfall"		2:36
13.	"Since Now"		1:43
14.	"What Tomorrow Brings"		3:09
15.	"The Profane Rights of Man" (CD bonus track, not included on Japan CD; non-album single, 2018)		2:07
Total length:			38:10

Japan bonus track
No.	Title	Length
15.	"The Kids Are Alt-Right" (non-album single, 2018)	2:44
Total length:		36:09

Note

- The hidden track on the CD edition, "The Kids Are Alt-Right", appears after 4 seconds of silence following "What Tomorrow Brings".

== Personnel ==
Adapted from the album liner notes.

Bad Religion

- Greg Graffin – lead vocals, backing vocals
- Brett Gurewitz – guitar, backing vocals
- Brian Baker – guitar, backing vocals
- Mike Dimkich – guitar
- Jay Bentley – bass, backing vocals
- Jamie Miller – drums

Additional musicians

- Gavin Caswell – slide guitar ("My Sanity")
- Nico Gurewitz, Emi Gurewitz, Gina Gurewitz, Angelyn de la Garza, Lucia de la Garza, Mila De La Garza, Sue Lucarelli, Christine Morales, Kelly Kettering, Adriana Roda-Stuart, Felicia Risolo, Melody Margarit, Kathie Merritt, Matt McGreevey – additional background vocals

Technical

- Carlos de la Garza – producer; mixing (except "Candidate")
- Brett Gurewitz – producer
- Greg Graffin – producer
- Clint Welander – engineer (except "Candidate")
- Zachary Zajdel – assistant engineer (except "Candidate")
- Sergio Chavez – additional engineer (except "Candidate")
- Adam Chagnon – additional engineer ("Candidate")
- Chris Lord-Alge – mixing ("Candidate")
- Brian Judd – mixing assistant ("Candidate")
- Joe Barresi – mixing ("The Profane Rights of Man")
- Dave Collins – mastering
- Trevor Hernandez – art direction, design
- David Black – cover photograph
- Alice Baxley – band photographs

== Charts ==
Chart performance for Age of Unreason
Chart (2019)	Peak position
Australian Albums (ARIA)	28
Austrian Albums (Ö3 Austria)	15
Belgian Albums (Ultratop Flanders)	43
Belgian Albums (Ultratop Wallonia)	163
Finnish Albums (Suomen virallinen lista)	12
German Albums (Offizielle Top 100)	8
Hungarian Albums (MAHASZ)	37
Japanese Albums (Oricon)	56
Scottish Albums (OCC)	41
Spanish Albums (PROMUSICAE)	41
Swedish Albums (Sverigetopplistan)	58
Swiss Albums (Schweizer Hitparade)	16
UK Independent Albums (OCC)	15
UK Rock & Metal Albums (OCC)	4
US Billboard 200	73
US Independent Albums (Billboard)	3
US Top Album Sales (Billboard)	11
US Top Alternative Albums (Billboard)	7
US Top Rock Albums (Billboard)	11
