= Bad Religion (disambiguation) =

Bad Religion is an American punk rock band.

Bad Religion may also refer to:

- Bad Religion (EP), a 1981 extended play by the band
- "Bad Religion" (Frank Ocean song), a 2012 song by Frank Ocean from the album Channel Orange
- "Bad Religion" (Godsmack song), a 2000 song by Godsmack
- ”Bad Religion”, a song by Motörhead on the 1992 album March ör Die

== See also ==
- Bad Religion discography
