= Christmas Songs (Bad Religion EP) =

EP by Bad Religion
- Released: October 29, 2013
- Recorded: 2013
- Studio: Joe's House Of Compression, Pasadena, California
- Genre: Punk rock, Christmas
- Length: 19:01
- Label: Epitaph
- Producer: Brett Gurewitz; Greg Graffin; Joe Barresi

Bad Religion chronology
True North (2013)	Christmas Songs (2013)	Age of Unreason (2019)

Christmas Songs is the third EP album by American punk rock band Bad Religion, released October 29, 2013, on Epitaph Records. It is their first full-length Christmas album, featuring eight covers of seasonal songs and an "Andy Wallace mix" version of "American Jesus". This is also the first Bad Religion album not to feature Greg Hetson on guitar since 1983's Into the Unknown, although he appears on "American Jesus", and the first time they recorded as a five-piece since 2000's The New America. Christmas Songs is also Bad Religion's final release with Brooks Wackerman on drums.

== Background ==
Although Bad Religion had played many Christmas songs in the past, mostly during the KROQ Almost Acoustic Christmas shows, the band had reportedly turned down offers to release a Christmas album. After three days of speculation, the official announcement of Christmas Songs came via Epitaph press release on September 10, 2013. 20% of the proceeds from Christmas Songs will go to SNAP (Survivors Network of those Abused by Priests).

== Cover ==
The cover picture comes from a picture titled "New Shoes" by Gerald Waller (Austria 1946). It is of an orphan boy who received new shoes from the American Red Cross.

== Reception ==
=== Critical ===
Professional ratings
Aggregate scores
Source	Rating
Metacritic	60/100
Review scores
Source	Rating
AllMusic	3/5 stars
Alternative Press	3.5/5 stars
Classic Rock	7/10 stars

Christmas Songs received mixed reviews from music critics upon its release. At Metacritic, which assigns a normalized rating out of 100 to reviews from mainstream critics, the album has received an average score of 60, based on 15 reviews, indicating "mixed or average" reviews.

== Track listing ==
No.	Title	Writer(s)	Length
1.	"Hark! The Herald Angels Sing"	Felix Mendelssohn, Charles Wesley	1:59
2.	"O Come All Ye Faithful"	John Francis Wade, Frederick Oakeley	2:04
3.	"O come, O come, Emmanuel"	Traditional, John Mason Neale	2:07
4.	"White Christmas" (to the beat of I Wanna Be Sedated by the Ramones)	Irving Berlin	1:49
5.	"Little Drummer Boy" (contains an interpolation of California Uber Alles by the Dead Kennedys)	Katherine Kennicott Davis	2:04
6.	"God Rest Ye Merry Gentlemen"	Traditional	1:39
7.	"What Child Is This?"	Traditional, William Chatterton Dix	1:53
8.	"Angels We Have Heard on High"	Traditional	2:07
9.	"American Jesus (Andy Wallace Mix)"	Brett Gurewitz, Greg Graffin	3:19
Total length:			19:01

== Personnel ==
Adapted from the album liner notes.

Bad Religion

- Greg Graffin – lead vocals, backing vocals, producer
- Brett Gurewitz – guitar, backing vocals, producer
- Brian Baker – guitar
- Jay Bentley – bass
- Brooks Wackerman – drums

Additional musicians

- Greg Hetson – guitar on "American Jesus"
- Bobby Schayer – drums on "American Jesus"

Technical

- Joe Barresi – producer, engineer, mixing
- Josh Smith – assistant engineer
- Jun Murakawa – assistant engineer
- Bob Ludwig – mastering
- Gerald Waller – cover photography
- Fred Hidalgo – additional photography, art direction, design

== Charts ==
Chart (2013)	Peak position
US Billboard 200	101
US Independent Albums (Billboard)	7
US Top Alternative Albums (Billboard)	18
US Top Hard Rock Albums (Billboard)	7
US Top Holiday Albums (Billboard)	7
US Top Rock Albums (Billboard)	31
