= The Devil in Stitches =

2010 single by Bad Religion

Single by Bad Religion

from the album The Dissent of Man
- Released: July 27, 2010
- Recorded: May–June 2010
- Genre: Pop rock
- Length: 3:29
- Label: Epitaph Records
- Songwriter(s): Brett Gurewitz
- Producer(s): Joe Barresi

Bad Religion singles chronology
"New Dark Ages" (2007)	"The Devil in Stitches" (2010)	"Cyanide" (2010)

"The Devil in Stitches" is a song written by Brett Gurewitz and performed by Bad Religion. It was the first single from their fifteenth studio album, The Dissent of Man, which was released on September 28, 2010.

== Chart performance ==
The song impacted radio on August 24, 2010, reaching No. 39 on the Hot Modern Rock Tracks, while it reached No. 38 on the Rock Songs chart. It was also the 24th most played song on KROQ in 2010.

== Appearances ==
The song was among those that appeared on formerly popular apps Tap Tap Revenge 3 and Tap Tap Revenge 4. Though the apps have now been taken off the App Store due to Disney no longer supporting it, the game and song remain for those who downloaded it previously.
