= New Maps of Hell (Bad Religion album) =

Studio album by Bad Religion
- Released: July 10, 2007
- Recorded: February–April 2007
- Studios: Grandmaster Recorders; The Evil Pink Room; (Hollywood)
- Genres: Melodic hardcore; skate punk
- Length: 38:27
- Label: Epitaph
- Producers: Joe Barresi; Brett Gurewitz; Greg Graffin

Bad Religion chronology
The Empire Strikes First (2004)	New Maps of Hell (2007)	30 Years Live (2010)

Singles from New Maps of Hell
- 1. "Honest Goodbye" Released: May 22, 2007; 2. "New Dark Ages" Released: October 23, 2007

New Maps of Hell is the fourteenth studio album by Bad Religion, released on July 10, 2007.

Bad Religion's follow-up to 2004's The Empire Strikes First was originally rumored to be a double album to be released in 2006, but this was denied by bassist Jay Bentley. Due to the band's ongoing support with their previous release, the album was put on hold until 2007. Another one of the reasons why the band had yet to release a follow-up to The Empire Strikes First was their various other activities, most obviously frontman Greg Graffin's, who released his second solo album in 2006, his first since 1997.

New Maps of Hell also marks the third Bad Religion album released after returning to Epitaph Records for 2002's The Process of Belief and with guitarist Brett Gurewitz since his departure during the release of 1994's Stranger Than Fiction.

The song "New Dark Ages" makes an appearance in the video game NHL 2K9.

== Background and composition ==
Bad Religion first mentioned the follow-up to The Empire Strikes First in 2005, stating that the band would begin recording it later that year, making it likely that it would be released sometime in 2006. In July 2005, it was announced that Graffin and Gurewitz had begun writing "about 20 songs or more" for the album.

On January 20, 2006, it was announced that Bad Religion was "almost 100% ready to go back to the studio or to the house" to begin working on the album. Members of the band had mentioned that it would be a double release, but this idea was later turned down flat by Bentley.

In early February 2006, Bentley was chatting with a visitor who comments on news articles at the official Bad Religion fansite, stating that the new Bad Religion album was planned for a September release, as well as a tour to follow.

== Recording ==
In May 2006, Bentley also mentioned that the band was planning to begin recording it around late June/early July. In September, the band mentioned they were in the process of demoing.

Bentley also told Kristoffer Averheim, the webmaster of the Bad Religion fansite, that the album had been pushed back to late 2006/early 2007. While drummer Brooks Wackerman posted a message on MySpace stating that the band had continued working on a new album, he stated that the album was once again pushed back to "mid/late 2007".

In January 2007, it was announced that the album would be called New Maps of Hell and the band would work with producer Joe Barresi. The band began recording at Grandmaster Recorders in Los Angeles, California, with all background vocals being recorded at Gurewitz's house (The Evil Pink Room). On April 1, Bentley posted an update on the MySpace bulletin board, stating that the band was finally finished recording the album and would soon begin mixing it. He had this to say:

We are done recording. Now it's mix time. We're getting ready to play the Santa Monica show and head down to Chile, Argentina, Brazil and Mexico for our tour... looking forward to getting back on the road...

== Release ==
On March 16, 2007, New Maps of Hell was announced for release and the track listing was revealed. The following month, they embarked on a tour of South America, encapsulating Argentina, Brazil, and Chile. On April 25, the track listing was rearranged and the track "New Chapter" was dropped. When asked why "New Chapter" would not appear on the album, Bentley recently stated that it "ran into insurmountable issues" that the band "couldn't rectify", hinting that it will probably appear on the next Bad Religion album. "Honest Goodbye" was made available for streaming via the band's Myspace account on May 15, and released as a single a week later. On May 25, "Heroes & Martyrs" was released as a free download.

"Honest Goodbye" was released to radio on June 12, 2007. From late June to late August, the band went on the 2007 edition of Warped Tour. New Maps of Hell was made available for streaming on July 3, and released a week later through Epitaph. Discussing the album's title, guitarist Brett Gurewitz stated "We all liked the concept of maps, because we are exploring new material on this record, both musically and topically." In September and October, the band went on a headlining tour across the US, with support from the Briggs and Gallows. "New Dark Ages" was released to radio on October 23. In November 2007, the band went on a headlining tour of Australia with Strung Out and MYC. On November 14, a music video was released for "New Dark Ages". The video for "Honest Goodbye" was planned, but "never made it out of the office" according to Bentley. The band ended the year with an appearance at the KROQ Almost Acoustic Christmas festival.

On February 27, 2008, Punknews.org reported that Epitaph would be releasing a deluxe edition of New Maps of Hell on July 8. In February and March, the band went on a West Coast tour of the US, consisting of two-night residencies in multiple Californian and Nevadan cities. Further shows were added, extending it into April 2008; Hi Fi Handgrenades supported some of these shows. They appeared on The Daily Habit, performing "We're Only Going to Die" and "New Dark Ages". On May 9, 2008, Punknews.org released the artwork for the reissue and more details, including the track list and the bonus DVD. The DVD features an hour of a live performance, music videos for "New Dark Ages" and "Honest Goodbye", a showing of Bad Religion making New Maps of Hell and Graffin and Gurewitz recording the seven acoustic bonus tracks. Three of the tracks are new – "Won't Somebody", "Adam's Atoms" and "Chronophobia" – written specifically for the deluxe edition; the other four are new acoustic versions of older Bad Religion songs. An electric version of "Won't Somebody" was later recorded for 2010's The Dissent of Man.

Over the next two months, the band appeared at various festivals in Europe including Groezrock, Pinkpop, Nova Rock and Hove. Between late June and late August 2008, the band performed on the Warped Tour. An acoustic version of "Sorrow" was posted on the band's Myspace on July 2. After two shows in Germany and Brazil, they played a few US shows, followed by a tour of Canada. The tour was supported by the Bronx, and was followed by a Californian tour until October 2008. They played a few West Coast US shows in March 2009, prior to a performance at the Punk Spring festival in Japan, which was followed by shows in Hawaii and Spain. In September and October 2009, the band went on a tour of Australia with NOFX.

== Reception ==
Professional ratings
Aggregate scores
Source	Rating
Metacritic	69/100
Review scores
Source	Rating
AllMusic	4/5 stars
The A.V. Club	B
IGN	8.7/10
Kerrang!	3/5 stars
PopMatters	7/10 stars
Punknews.org	4.5/5 stars

Following the album's release, it debuted at number 35 on the U.S. Billboard 200, selling about 21,000 copies in its first week.

== Track listing ==
All tracks credited jointly to Greg Graffin and Brett Gurewitz in the album liner notes.

No.	Title	Writer(s)	Length
1.	"52 Seconds"	Gurewitz	0:58
2.	"Heroes & Martyrs"	Gurewitz	1:25
3.	"Germs of Perfection"	Graffin	1:27
4.	"New Dark Ages"	Gurewitz	2:47
5.	"Requiem for Dissent"	Graffin	2:08
6.	"Before You Die"	Graffin	2:34
7.	"Honest Goodbye"	Gurewitz	2:51
8.	"Dearly Beloved"	Gurewitz	2:19
9.	"Grains of Wrath"	Graffin	3:00
10.	"Murder"	Gurewitz	1:18
11.	"Scrutiny"	Graffin	2:36
12.	"Prodigal Son"	Gurewitz	3:07
13.	"The Grand Delusion"	Graffin	2:10
14.	"Lost Pilgrim"	Graffin	2:28
15.	"Submission Complete"	Graffin	3:40
16.	"Fields of Mars"	Gurewitz	3:39
Total length:			38:27

2008 deluxe edition bonus tracks
No.	Title	Writer(s)	Length
17.	Untitled		0:04
18.	"Won't Somebody" (acoustic)	Gurewitz	3:08
19.	"Adam's Atoms" (acoustic)	Graffin	2:37
20.	"Sorrow" (acoustic)	Gurewitz	3:12
21.	"God Song" (acoustic)	Graffin	2:40
22.	"Dearly Beloved" (acoustic)	Gurewitz	2:37
23.	"Chronophobia" (acoustic)	Graffin	1:55
24.	"Skyscraper" (acoustic)	Gurewitz	3:00
Total length:			60:19

Deluxe edition bonus DVD
No.	Title	Length
1.	"Complete concert performance from the House of Blues, Las Vegas"
2.	"Documentary footage of Brett and Greg recording 7 acoustic tracks"
3.	"Music videos for "Honest Goodbye" and "New Dark Ages""
4.	"Footage of the making of the New Maps of Hell album"

== Personnel ==
Adapted from the album liner notes.

Bad Religion

- Greg Graffin – vocals, piano (uncredited)
- Brett Gurewitz – guitar, backing vocals
- Brian Baker – guitar
- Greg Hetson – guitar
- Jay Bentley – bass, backing vocals
- Brooks Wackerman – drums

Additional musicians

- Vanna – additional backing vocals on "Requiem for Dissent"

Technical

- Joe Barresi – producer, engineer, mixer
- The Evil Twins (Gurewitz and Graffin) – co-producer
- Andrew Alekel – assistant engineer
- Mike Fasano – drum technician
- Nick Pritchard – art direction, design
- Bryan Sheffield – photography

== Charts ==
Chart (2007)	Peak position
Austrian Albums (Ö3 Austria)	64
Finnish Albums (Suomen virallinen lista)	29
German Albums (Offizielle Top 100)	37
Swedish Albums (Sverigetopplistan)	41
Swiss Albums (Schweizer Hitparade)	49
UK Independent Albums (Official Charts)	10
UK Rock & Metal Albums (Official Charts)	9
US Billboard 200	35
US Independent Albums (Billboard)	3
US Top Alternative Albums (Billboard)	13
US Top Hard Rock Albums (Billboard)	7
US Top Rock Albums (Billboard)	14
