= The Dissent of Man =

Studio album by Bad Religion
- Released: September 28, 2010
- Recorded: May–June 2010
- Studios: Joe's House of Compression, Pasadena, California
- Genres: Punk rock; melodic hardcore
- Length: 43:00
- Label: Epitaph
- Producers: Joe Barresi; Brett Gurewitz; Greg Graffin

Bad Religion chronology
30 Years Live (2010)	The Dissent of Man (2010)	True North (2013)

Singles from The Dissent of Man
- 1. "The Devil in Stitches" Released: July 27, 2010; 2. "Cyanide" Released: November 2010; 3. "Wrong Way Kids" Released: April 5, 2011

The Dissent of Man is the fifteenth studio album by American punk rock band Bad Religion, released on September 28, 2010. It was their first album in three years, following the release of New Maps of Hell in 2007. The band commenced writing new material in 2008, but would not begin studio work until May 2010. The writing and recording process spanned two years and was slowed down considerably by touring schedules. The album was finally finished in June 2010. Some of the material ("The Resist Stance", which originally appeared on the live album 30 Years Live, and an updated version of "Won't Somebody", which was a bonus track on the deluxe edition of previous album New Maps of Hell) was originally performed live by Bad Religion on its 30th anniversary tour in early 2010. "The Devil in Stitches" was released as a single to accompany the release of this album, while "Cyanide" and "Wrong Way Kids" also received radio airplay. Clocking in at 43 minutes, The Dissent of Man is Bad Religion's longest album to date.

== Background ==
Work for The Dissent of Man dates back to June 2008, when bassist Jay Bentley revealed in an interview at the Pinkpop Festival in Landgraaf, Netherlands that guitarist Brett Gurewitz had already started writing new material for the next Bad Religion album. He also revealed that Bad Religion was planning to return to the studio after frontman Greg Graffin teaches UCLA to start work on the album planned for a June 2009 release. However, in December 2008, Bentley revealed that, due to Bad Religion's upcoming touring commitments for 2009, the band would not have a chance to record their new album until around the end of the year, for an expected 2010 release date.

== Recording ==
In December 2009, Bentley revealed to the fan site The Bad Religion Page that the band was expected to go into the studio on April 26, 2010, to start recording their new album. He stated that a few songs for the album had been written and "it feels like the songwriting is picking up momentum. Baker said he was going to drive up to Graffin's, Brooks and I are going to do some demos with Brett, so we have a pretty good jump." In the following month, Bentley revealed that Bad Religion would record their new album at a studio in Pasadena, California with Joe Barresi, who produced New Maps of Hell and engineered its 2004 predecessor The Empire Strikes First. Despite the statement made by Bentley about entering the studio in April, he noted that the recording date was now May 1. On April 6, 2010, Bentley revealed in an interview with KROQ's Kevin and Bean that the date on which the band would record their new album was now May 6.

On May 12, 2010 (Gurewitz's 48th birthday), Bentley posted an update on their Facebook page regarding the recording process of the album:

First week of recording at Joe [Barresi]'s house of compression and Brooks [Wackerman] gets the medal for "super-ass-kicking". Brian [Baker] has finished 14 basics... a couple more to go. I started getting some good bass sounds late, late last night, the liver wins the shootout again. Brett [Gurewitz] is playing late night tracks on his birthday, some way to celebrate! Happy birthday B.G.! Quote of the day; BG – "What percentage of the sound is coming from the snakeskin?". Ha ha... working of album titles and ideas today. It's all coming together. Joe [Barresi] says the corn flavored Kit Kats are gross, but the wasabi ones are quite delicious... get back to work. Work, work, work. Will send photo's [sic] soon.

— Jay Bentley

== Release ==
Between June and August 2010, the band played various festivals across Europe, including Rock am Ring, Rebellion and Sziget. In an interview at the Azkena Rock Festival in Spain in late June 2010, Wackerman and Bentley revealed that the album would be called The Dissent of Man and would be released in four months' time. On July 27, 2010, anyone who was a member of the Bad Religion mailing list received a link showing the album art and song list. Additionally, some members of the mailing list received a set of links. One allowed them to listen to the first single from the album, "The Devil in Stitches". The others were to get "first dibs" on pre-sale for the album and merchandise. Following this, they went on a short tour of the UK. "The Devil in Stitches" was released to radio on August 24, 2010.

On September 21, 2010 the full album was made available for streaming on Bad Religion's MySpace page. Five days later, the band performed at the Epicenter festival. In mid-November 2010, KROQ began playing the second single "Cyanide". A month earlier, Bad Religion announced plans to make a video for "Wrong Way Kids", to which the band was looking for "old punk rock photos to use in the video." Fans were required to submit their photos at the Wrong Way Kids website or by e-mail. After months of speculation, the video for "Wrong Way Kids" was premiered on April 19, 2011. "Wrong Way Kids" was released to radio on April 5, 2011.

== Reception ==
Professional ratings
Aggregate scores
Source	Rating
Metacritic	75/100 link
Review scores
Source	Rating
AllMusic	3/5 stars
The A.V. Club	B−
Kerrang!	5/5 stars
Rock Sound	8/10 stars
Spin	7/10 stars
The Music Cycle	4/5 stars
Punknews.org	4/5 stars
BLARE Magazine	4/5 stars

The Dissent of Man debuted at No. 35 on the Billboard 200 chart and at No. 6 on the Billboard Independent Albums chart.

The album's lead single, "The Devil in Stitches", enjoyed some success on the charts, reaching No. 39 on the Hot Modern Rock Tracks, while it reached No. 38 on the Rock Songs chart.

== Track listing ==
All tracks are written by Greg Graffin and Brett Gurewitz.

No.	Title	Length
1.	"The Day That the Earth Stalled"	1:23
2.	"Only Rain"	2:43
3.	"The Resist Stance"	2:32
4.	"Won't Somebody"	2:42
5.	"The Devil in Stitches"	3:28
6.	"Pride and the Pallor"	2:56
7.	"Wrong Way Kids"	2:43
8.	"Meeting of the Minds"	2:06
9.	"Someone to Believe"	2:38
10.	"Avalon"	3:28
11.	"Cyanide"	3:55
12.	"Turn Your Back on Me"	2:24
13.	"Ad Hominem"	3:28
14.	"Where the Fun Is"	3:04
15.	"I Won't Say Anything"	3:22
Total length:		43:00

Bonus tracks

Japanese CD and deluxe digital download bonus track
No.	Title	Writer(s)	Length
16.	"Finite"	Graffin	3:51
Total length:			46:51

Deluxe digital download tracks
No.	Title	Writer(s)	Length
17.	"Best for You" (Live)	Graffin	2:09
18.	"Pessimistic Lines" (Live)	Graffin	1:15
19.	"How Much Is Enough?" (Live)	Gurewitz	1:33
20.	"Generator" (Live)	Gurewitz	3:36
Total length:			55:15

== Personnel ==
Adapted from the album liner notes.

Bad Religion

- Greg Graffin – vocals
- Brett Gurewitz – guitar, backing vocals
- Brian Baker – guitar
- Greg Hetson – guitar
- Jay Bentley – bass, backing vocals
- Brooks Wackerman – drums

Additional musicians

- Steve Fishell – pedal steel on "Cyanide"
- Mike Campbell – guitar solo on "Cyanide"
- George Drakoulias – percussion

Technical

- Joe Barresi – producer, engineer, mixing
- Brett Gurewitz – producer
- Greg Graffin – producer
- Morgan Stratton – assistant engineer
- Brian Gardner – mastering
- Gavin Caswell – guitar tech
- Mike Fasano – drum tech
- John Yates – design

== Charts ==
Chart (2010)	Peak position
Austrian Albums (Ö3 Austria)	61
Belgian Albums (Ultratop Flanders)	97
Finnish Albums (Suomen virallinen lista)	43
German Albums (Offizielle Top 100)	33
Japanese Albums (Oricon)	46
Swedish Albums (Sverigetopplistan)	56
Swiss Albums (Schweizer Hitparade)	79
UK Independent Albums (Official Charts)	13
UK Rock & Metal Albums (Official Charts)	15
US Billboard 200	35
US Independent Albums (Billboard)	6
US Top Alternative Albums (Billboard)	7
US Top Rock Albums (Billboard)	11
