= Millport (album) =

Studio album by Greg Graffin
- Released: March 10, 2017
- Genre: Country rock, folk, roots rock, Americana
- Length: 31:42
- Label: Anti-
- Producer: Brett Gurewitz

Greg Graffin chronology
Cold as the Clay (2006)	Millport (2017)

Professional ratings
Review scores
Source	Rating
AllMusic	3.5/5 stars
The Irish Times	4/5 stars
Punknews.org	3.5/5 stars

Millport is the third solo album by Bad Religion lead singer Greg Graffin, released on March 10, 2017.

== Track listing ==
No.	Title	Length
1.	"Backroads of My Mind"	3:53
2.	"Too Many Virtues"	3:04
3.	"Lincoln's Funeral Train"	3:44
4.	"Millport"	3:20
5.	"Time of Need"	3:33
6.	"Making Time"	3:24
7.	"Shotgun"	2:39
8.	"Echo on the Hill"	2:31
9.	"Sawmill"	2:12
10.	"Waxwings"	3:28
Total length:		31:42
