= Joe Barresi =

American record producer

Joe Barresi (nicknamed "Evil Joe") is an American record engineer and producer who has worked with Kyuss, Melvins, Tool, Chevelle, Apocalyptica, Queens of the Stone Age, Coheed and Cambria, Tomahawk, L7, The Jesus Lizard, Parkway Drive, New Model Army, Bad Religion, Pennywise, Judas Priest, Soundgarden, Stam1na, Weezer, Avenged Sevenfold, Nine Inch Nails, and Slipknot.

== Early life and education ==
Joe Barresi started playing guitar when he was seven, and played in local bands in and around his home in New York City and Florida. He studied classical guitar and music theory at the University of South Florida before graduating from the University of Miami, where he also studied piano and music engineering. As a student, Barresi began recording and developing local bands in Miami.

== Career ==
After graduating from college, Barresi moved to Los Angeles and began working his way up the ladder by working at numerous local studios—a move that helped him gain an understanding of the different consoles, rooms and clientele at the various studios. His first big break came when he engineered a demo for producer GGGarth Richardson. He went on to work with a number of well-respected producers including David Kahne, Michael Beinhorn, Rob Cavallo and Sylvia Massy.

Barresi has mixed tracks for Monster Magnet, Fair to Midland, Hole, Veruca Salt, Weezer, Rancid, Bauhaus, Anthrax, Skunk Anansie, and Alpha Galates.

Eventually Barresi gained enough experience and insight that he began producing records. He has produced or co-produced tracks for Clutch, Buckcherry, Fu Manchu, Loudmouth, The Melvins, L7 and others. He also produced the debut album by Queens of the Stone Age which, at the time, did not have a record deal. That album was eventually released by indie label Loose Groove. The self-titled album garnered attention from press, and the band soon landed a deal with Interscope Records. Barresi then engineered and mixed the Tool album 10,000 Days, a job he received after a recommendation from Buzz Osborne of The Melvins In 2011, he worked with the band Stam1na in Finland. Barresi engineered and mixed Tool's 2019 album Fear Inoculum

Today Joe Barresi has his own home studio JHOC (Joe's House of Compression) and is famous for developing certain recording techniques.

== Discography ==
=== As producer ===
Artist	Album name	Year
Apocalyptica	Plays Metallica, Vol. 2	2024
Avenged Sevenfold	Life Is But a Dream...	2023
Slipknot	The End, So Far	2022
The Bronx	Bronx VI	2021
Chevelle	NIRATIAS	2021
Pallbearer	Heartless	2017
Avenged Sevenfold	The Stage	2016
Chevelle	The North Corridor	2016
Black Stone Cherry	Magic Mountain	2014
Chevelle	La Gárgola	2014
Bad Religion	True North	2013
Stam1na	Nocebo	2012
Every Time I Die	Ex Lives	2012
Chevelle	Hats Off to the Bull	2011
Fair to Midland	Arrows and Anchors	2011
Bad Religion	The Dissent of Man	2010
Apocalyptica	7th Symphony	2010
Coheed and Cambria	Year of The Black Rainbow	2010
Pearl	Little Immaculate White Fox	2010
Parkway Drive	Deep Blue	2010
Audrey Horne	Audrey Horne	2010
Isis	Wavering Radiant	2009
Kazuya Yoshii	VOLT	2009
Saviours	Into Abaddon	2008
Zico Chain	Food	2007
Puscifer	Cuntry Boner	2007
Clutch	From Beale Street to Oblivion	2007
Mínus	The Great Northern Whalekill	2007
Bad Religion	New Maps of Hell	2007
The Butterfly Effect	Imago	2006
Audrey Horne	No Hay Banda	2005
Queens of the Stone Age	Lullabies to Paralyze	2005
Tomahawk	Mit Gas	2003
Matchbook Romance	Stories and Alibis	2003
Backyard Babies	Stockholm Syndrome	2003
Powerman 5000	Transform	2003
Pennywise	Land of the Free?	2001
Fu Manchu	King of the Road	1999
Queens of the Stone Age	Queens of the Stone Age	1998
Melvins	Honky	1997
Melvins	Stag	1996

=== As mixer ===
Artist	Album name	Year
Baroness	Stone	2023
Dio	Holy Diver	2022 (Remix of the 1983 Album)
Jerry Cantrell	Brighten	(2021)
The Bronx	Bronx VI	2021
Chevelle	Niratias	2021
Tool	Fear Inoculum	(2019)
Slipknot	We Are Not Your Kind	(2019)
Alice In Chains	Rainier Fog	(2018)
Monster Magnet	Mindfucker	(2018)
Suicide Silence	Suicide Silence	(2017)
Pallbearer	Heartless	(2017)
De La Tierra	De La Tierra II	(2016)
Avenged Sevenfold	The Stage	(2016)
Red Fang	Only Ghosts	(2016)
Chevelle	The North Corridor	(2016)
Volbeat	Seal The Deal And Let's Boogie	(2016)
Buckcherry	Rock N Roll	(2016)
Dommin	Rise	(2015)
Monster Magnet	Cobras and Fire (The Mastermind Redux)	(2015)
Hardcore Superstar	HCSS	(2015)
Monster Magnet	Milking the Stars: A Re-Imagining Of Last Patrol	(2014)
Slipknot	.5: The Gray Chapter	(2014)
Black Stone Cherry	Magic Mountain	(2014)
Chevelle	La Gargola	(2014)
New Model Army	Between Wine and Blood	(2014)
Bad Religion	Christmas Songs	(2013)
Monster Magnet	Last Patrol	(2013)
New Model Army	Between Dog and Wolf	(2013)
Buckcherry	Confessions	(2013)
Volto!	Incitare	(2013)
Soundgarden	King Animal	(2012)
Every Time I Die	Ex Lives	(2012)
Stam1na	Nocebo	(2012)
Chevelle	Hats Off To The Bull	(2011)
Fair To Midland	Arrows and Anchors	(2011)
Face To Face	Laugh Now, Laugh Later	(2011)
Ndidi O	Escape	(2011)
Middle Class Rut	No Name No Color	(2010)
Parkway Drive	Deep Blue	(2010)
Apocalyptica	7th Symphony	(2010)
Coheed and Cambria	Year of The Black Rainbow	(2010)
Pearl	Little Immaculate White Fox	(2010)
Isis	Wavering Radiant	(2009)
Kazuya Yoshii	VOLT	2009
Disciple	Southern Hospitality	(2008)
Satyricon	The Age of Nero	(2008)
Saviours	Into Abaddon	(2008)
Enslaved	Vertebrae	(2008)
Xavier Rudd	Dark Shades of Blue	(2008)
Braintoy	Vehicles	(2008)
Alpha Galates	A Stimulus for Reason	(2007)
Puscifer	Cuntry Boner	(2007)
Clutch	From Beale Street To Oblivion	(2007)
Bad Religion	New Maps of Hell	(2007)
Queens of the Stone Age	Era Vulgaris	(2007)
Zico Chain	Food	(2007)
Tool	10,000 Days	(2006)
The Juliana Theory	Deadbeat Sweetheartbeat	(2005)
Matchbook Romance	Stories and Alibis	(2003)
Rancid	Indestructible (2 tracks)	(2003)
Amen	Amen (2 tracks)	(1999)
Psycore	I'm Not One of Us	(1999)
Fu Manchu	King of the Road	(1999)
Fu Manchu	The Action Is Go	(1997)
Tribe of Gypsies	Tribe of Gypsies	(1996)
Skunk Anansie	Stoosh	(1996)
Downset	Do We Speak A Dead Language?	(1996)
Kyuss	Welcome to Sky Valley	(1994)
Kyuss	Blues for the Red Sun	(1992)

=== As engineer ===
Artist	Album name	Year
The Bronx	Bronx VI	2021
Chevelle	Niratias	2021
Tool	Fear Inoculum	(2019)
Avenged Sevenfold	"Mad Hatter"	(2018)
Avenged Sevenfold	The Stage	(2016)
Chevelle	The North Corridor	(2016)
Black Stone Cherry	Magic Mountain	(2014)
Chevelle	La Gargola	(2014)
Bad Religion	Christmas Songs	(2013)
Nine Inch Nails	Hesitation Marks	(2013)
Volto!	Incitare	(2013)
The Presets	Pacifica	(2012)
Every Time I Die	Ex Lives	(2012)
Stam1na	Nocebo	(2012)
Chevelle	Hats Off To The Bull	(2011)
Fair To Midland	Arrows and Anchors	(2011)
Parkway Drive	Deep Blue	(2010)
Apocalyptica	7th Symphony	(2010)
Coheed and Cambria	Year of The Black Rainbow	(2010)
Pearl	Little Immaculate White Fox	(2010)
Isis	Wavering Radiant	(2009)
Alpha Rev	New Morning	(2009)
Wolfmother	Cosmic Egg	(2009)
Matisyahu	Light	(2009)
Taking Back Sunday	New Again	(2008)
Satyricon	The Age of Nero	(2008)
Kelly Clarkson	My December	(2007)
Tool	10,000 Days	(2006)
Bad Religion	The Empire Strikes First	(2004)
Matchbook Romance	Stories and Alibis	(2003)
Fu Manchu	King of the Road	(1999)
The Jesus Lizard	Blue	(1998)
L7	The Beauty Process: Triple Platinum	(1997)
Weezer	Pinkerton	(1996)
Kyuss	...And the Circus Leaves Town	(1995)
L7	Hungry for Stink	(1994)
Melvins	Stoner Witch	(1994)
Kyuss	Welcome to Sky Valley	(1994)
Kyuss	Blues for the Red Sun	(1992)
Cry Wolf	Crunch	(1990)
