= True North (Bad Religion album) =

Studio album by Bad Religion
- Released: January 22, 2013
- Recorded: July–August 2012
- Studio: Joe's House of Compression, Pasadena, California
- Genre: Melodic hardcore
- Length: 35:16
- Label: Epitaph
- Producer: Joe Barresi, Greg Graffin, Brett Gurewitz

Bad Religion chronology
The Dissent of Man (2010)	True North (2013)	Christmas Songs (2013)

Singles from True North
- 1. "Fuck You" Released: November 6, 2012; 2. "True North" Released: December 18, 2012

True North is the sixteenth studio album by the California punk rock band Bad Religion, which was released on January 22, 2013. After touring in support of their previous album The Dissent of Man (2010), Bad Religion began writing new material for an album that was planned for release in 2012. During their 2011 tour, frontman Greg Graffin stated that Bad Religion would make "one more album and then all join the navy, do honest work", which led to speculation that they were breaking up, although this turned out not to be the case. The recording sessions took place in July and August 2012 at Joe's House of Compression, a studio owned by Joe Barresi, who produced the album.

True North was met with positive reviews upon release, and peaked at number 19 on the Billboard 200 albums chart, becoming Bad Religion's first album to crack the top 20 and their highest ever peak on that chart in their career. This is the band's last album with guitarist Greg Hetson and drummer Brooks Wackerman, who left the band in April 2013 and October 2015, respectively.

== Background ==
Bad Religion released their 15th studio album The Dissent of Man on September 28, 2010, via Epitaph Records. In 2011, they went on tour with American punk band Rise Against, who were promoting their new LP Endgame. While on tour with Rise Against, vocalist Greg Graffin told The Washington Examiner that he did not know when the band would release a new album, saying, "It's all very punk just like it's always been. We will record when we have enough songs. For us, it just kind of happens." During a show in Boston, Graffin told the audience that "after this year you probably won't be seeing much more of us. We're going to try one more album and then all join the navy, do honest work." This led to rumors that Bad Religion was planning on disbanding after their next album. Graffin dismissed the rumors, telling Billboard in 2013, "I always joke when I'm onstage, and sometimes my dry sense of humor doesn't translate with people who are in the audience."

In an interview at the KROQ Weenie Roast on June 4, 2011, Graffin stated that Bad Religion was planning to record and release their sixteenth studio album in 2012, while bassist Jay Bentley mentioned an early 2012 timeframe for going back into the studio in an interview at Live 105's BFD festival, which took place on the day after the Weenie Roast.

== Recording ==
On June 4, 2012, Bentley confirmed in a post on the message board of the band's fan site The Bad Religion Page that they were expected to begin recording their new album in July and August. A week later, he revealed that guitarist Brett Gurewitz and Joe Barresi were going to produce it. On July 23, the band uploaded a picture to Bad Religion's Facebook page of all the members (except Greg Hetson, who took the picture) in the studio with the caption, "here we go again," indicating that work on their sixteenth studio album had begun. On August 22, Gurewitz tweeted that they were mixing the album, and a month later, he tweeted that the band was finishing it. During Bad Religion's performance at the En Vivo festival in Spain in September 2012, Graffin stated that True North was supposed to be released by Christmas, although this turned out not to be the case.

== Release ==
On January 15, 2013, the band started streaming the album on their YouTube page. Singles to promote True North were "Fuck You" and the title track. The latter was released to radio on January 29, 2013.

On January 30, 2013, the band appeared on Late Night with Jimmy Fallon, playing "Past is Dead".

== Reception ==
=== Critical reception ===
Professional ratings
Aggregate scores
Source	Rating
AnyDecentMusic?	6.9/10
Metacritic	75/100
Review scores
Source	Rating
AllMusic	3/5 stars
The A.V. Club	B+
Consequence of Sound	C+
DIY	4.5/5 stars
The Line of Best Fit	7/10
musicOMH	4.5/5 stars
PopMatters	8/10
Punknews.org	5/5 stars
Spin	7/10

True North was met with mostly positive reviews from music critics. At Metacritic, which assigns a normalized rating out of 100 to reviews from mainstream critics, the album has an average score of 75 based on 21 reviews. The review aggregator AnyDecentMusic? gave True North a 6.9 out of 10, based on their assessment of the critical consensus.

Reviews largely targeted the fact that True North was Bad Religion's 16th studio album. Johnny Owen of DIY said that "it's fair to say that SoCal melodic hardcore elder statesmen Bad Religion's style and themes are pretty well established", but praised the band for including "some of the strongest, most focused material that the band have recorded in many years". The Line of Best Fit's Joe Goggins said that "originality might no longer reign in the world of Bad Religion, but reliability and accessibility certainly do", and declared True North "another solid addition to a formidable canon". Writing for The Boston Globe, Scott McLennan wrote, "Bad Religion's populist positions remain unyielding, but after 30 years the band still puts a fresh face to the struggles it sees." Others were more critical of Bad Religion's adherence to form, with Ryan Bray of Consequence of Sound saying that True North "integrates itself a little too well to stand apart from the pack", and Martin Headon of musicOMH declaring it "a decent album, but one with no real standout tracks". Andy Johnson of PopMatters wrote that, "If there's a downside to the decision to focus on a lean, fast sound, it's that it encourages Bad Religion's longtime tendency towards a kind of creative inertia."

Several critics praised "Robin Hood in Reverse" as the standout track of the album. Ian Winwood of the BBC referred to the track as "a frenetically paced number packed with chorus-sized verses that will be familiar to anyone who, over the years, has found pleasure in the music made by Bad Religion". Chris Moran of Punknews.org compared "Robin Hood in Reverse" to Bad Religion's 1994 album Stranger than Fiction, praising "Graffin's direct social commentary and uncanny vocabulary arsenal". Spin's Kory Grow, meanwhile, used the song as an example of True North's "clever, unforgettable hooks". "Fuck You" also received praise, with Jason Heller of The A.V. Club calling the song "one of the album's most eloquent tracks, both musically and lyrically", and Jason Lymangrover of AllMusic using the track as an example of the album's "rare moments of lyrical levity".

=== Commercial performance and accolades ===
True North had a strong commercial showing in Europe and North America. In the US, the album spent two weeks on the Billboard 200 chart, peaking at number 19. It also appeared on the Top Rock Albums and Top Alternative Albums charts, peaking at number seven and number four, respectively. The album also appeared on the Billboard Canadian Albums Chart at number 14. In the United Kingdom, True North peaked at number 129. Elsewhere in Europe, the album reached number 27 in Austria, number five in Finland, number ten in Germany, number 86 in the Netherlands, number 31 in Sweden, and number 14 in Switzerland. Outside of Europe and North America, True North also appeared on the Japanese Oricon chart, at number 56.

True North appeared at number seven in Punknews.org's list of the top 20 albums of 2013.

== Track listing ==
All tracks are written by Greg Graffin and Brett Gurewitz.

Standard edition track listing
No.	Title	Length
1.	"True North"	1:56
2.	"Past Is Dead"	2:39
3.	"Robin Hood in Reverse"	2:53
4.	"Land of Endless Greed"	1:53
5.	"Fuck You"	2:14
6.	"Dharma and the Bomb"	2:00
7.	"Hello Cruel World"	3:50
8.	"Vanity"	1:01
9.	"In Their Hearts Is Right"	1:59
10.	"Crisis Time"	2:39
11.	"Dept. of False Hope"	2:40
12.	"Nothing to Dismay"	2:07
13.	"Popular Consensus"	1:53
14.	"My Head Is Full of Ghosts"	1:46
15.	"The Island"	1:28
16.	"Changing Tide"	2:18
Total length:		35:16

== Personnel ==
Bad Religion

- Greg Graffin – vocals, producer
- Jay Bentley – bass guitar, backing vocals
- Brett Gurewitz – guitar, backing vocals, lead vocals on "Dharma and the Bomb", producer, mixing
- Greg Hetson – guitar
- Brian Baker – guitar
- Brooks Wackerman – drums

Technical

- Joe Barresi – producer, engineer, mixing
- Jun Murawaka – assistant engineer
- Bob Ludwig – mastering
- Fred Hidalgo – art direction, design

Information taken from the True North liner notes.

== Charts ==
Chart performance for True North
Chart (2013)	Peak position
Australian Albums (ARIA)	59
Austrian Albums (Ö3 Austria)	27
Canadian Albums (Billboard)	14
Finnish Albums (Suomen virallinen lista)	5
German Albums (Offizielle Top 100)	10
Japanese Albums (Oricon)	56
Dutch Albums (Album Top 100)	86
Swedish Albums (Sverigetopplistan)	31
Swiss Albums (Schweizer Hitparade)	14
UK Independent Albums (OCC)	17
UK Rock & Metal Albums (OCC)	11
US Billboard 200	19
US Independent Albums (Billboard)	5
US Top Rock Albums (Billboard)	7
US Top Alternative Albums (Billboard)	4
