= Brian Baker (musician) =

American punk rock musician (born 1965)

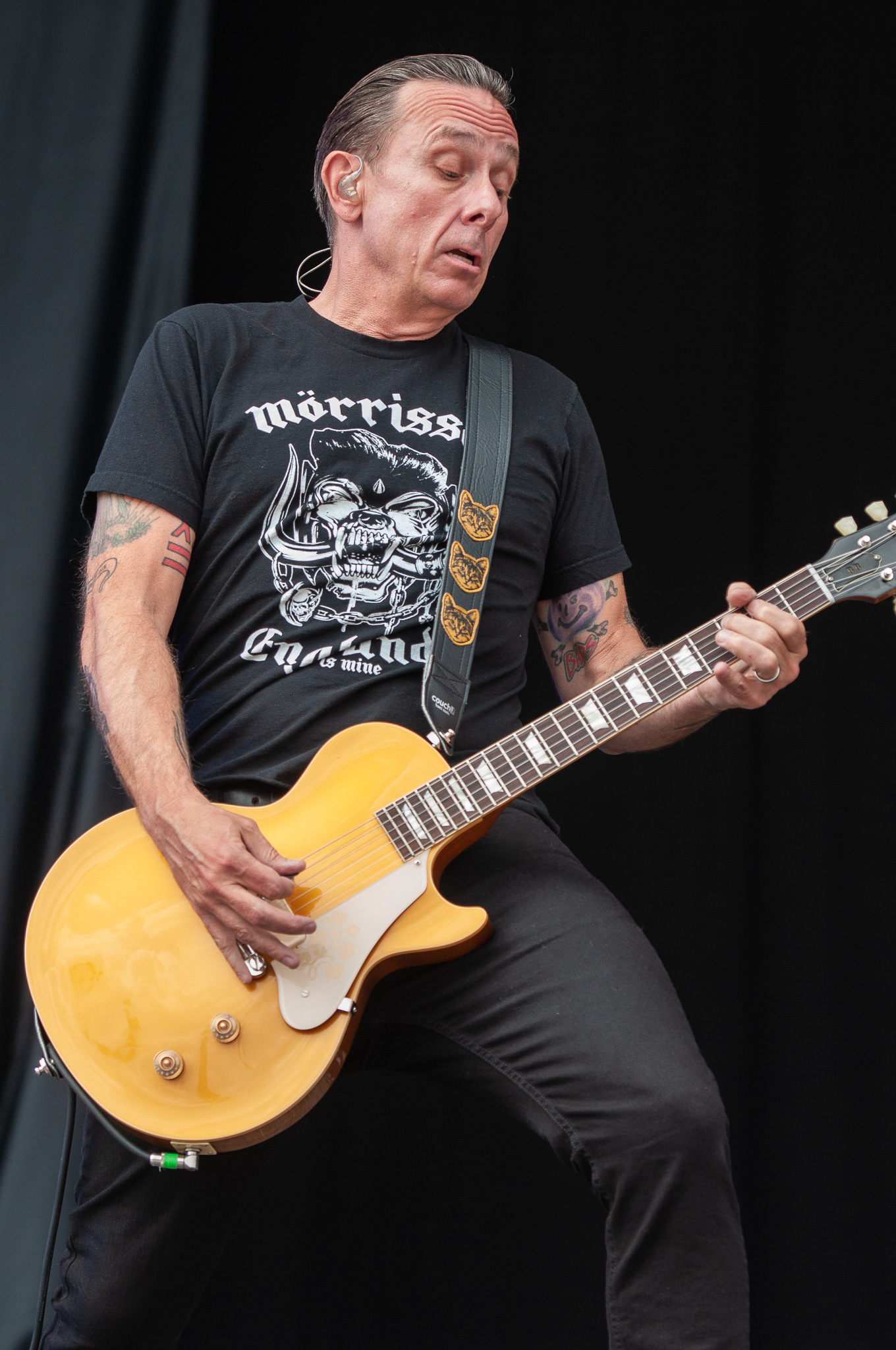
- Baker performing with Bad Religion in 2018

Background information
- Born: February 25, 1965 (age 61)
- Genres: Hardcore punk, punk rock, melodic hardcore
- Occupation: Musician
- Instruments: Guitar, bass
- Years active: 1980–present
- Member of: Bad Religion
- Formerly of: Minor Threat; Samhain; Dag Nasty; The Meatmen; Government Issue; Junkyard

Brian Baker (born February 25, 1965) is an American guitarist and bassist. He is best known as one of the founding members of the hardcore punk band Minor Threat, and as a guitarist in the melodic hardcore band Bad Religion since 1994. In Minor Threat, he originally played bass guitar before switching to guitar in 1982 when Steve Hansgen joined the band, and then moved back to bass after Hansgen's departure. He also founded Dag Nasty in 1985, was part of the original line-up of Samhain, and has had stints in Doggy Style, The Meatmen (with fellow Minor Threat member Lyle Preslar), Government Issue, and Junkyard (a hard rock band).

In 1994 Baker was offered a spot as a touring musician with R.E.M. but declined, opting instead to accept a position in Bad Religion as Brett Gurewitz's replacement. He also experimented with a more pop direction influenced by U2, with a band called 400. Baker briefly toured with Me First and the Gimme Gimmes in 2005 and appeared on Canadian punk band Penelope's second album (Face au silence du monde). He has been a frequent guest guitarist on many songs and albums by artists as varied as Blood Bats, Tesco Vee, Ric Ocasek, Teenage Time Killers, Mind Over Four, Dangerous Toys, Pollen Art, Unwritten Law, Travis Cut, Lickity Split, Hot Water Music, Down By Law, Bash & Pop, Middle Aged Brigade, Careless, and many others.

The supergroup Foxhall Stacks, composed of Baker, Bill Barbot (Jawbox), Peter Moffett (Burning Airlines, Government Issue), and Jim Spellman (High Back Chairs, Velocity Girl) released their debut album, The Coming Collapse, in 2019. Another supergroup, Fake Names, formed with vocalist Dennis Lyxzén (Refused, The (International) Noise Conspiracy, INVSN), guitarist Michael Hampton (S.O.A., Embrace, One Last Wish), bassist Johnny Temple (Girls Against Boys, Soulside), and drummer Matt Schulz (Enon, Lab Partners, Holy Fuck), began touring in 2018 and released a self-titled debut album in 2020.

== Discography ==
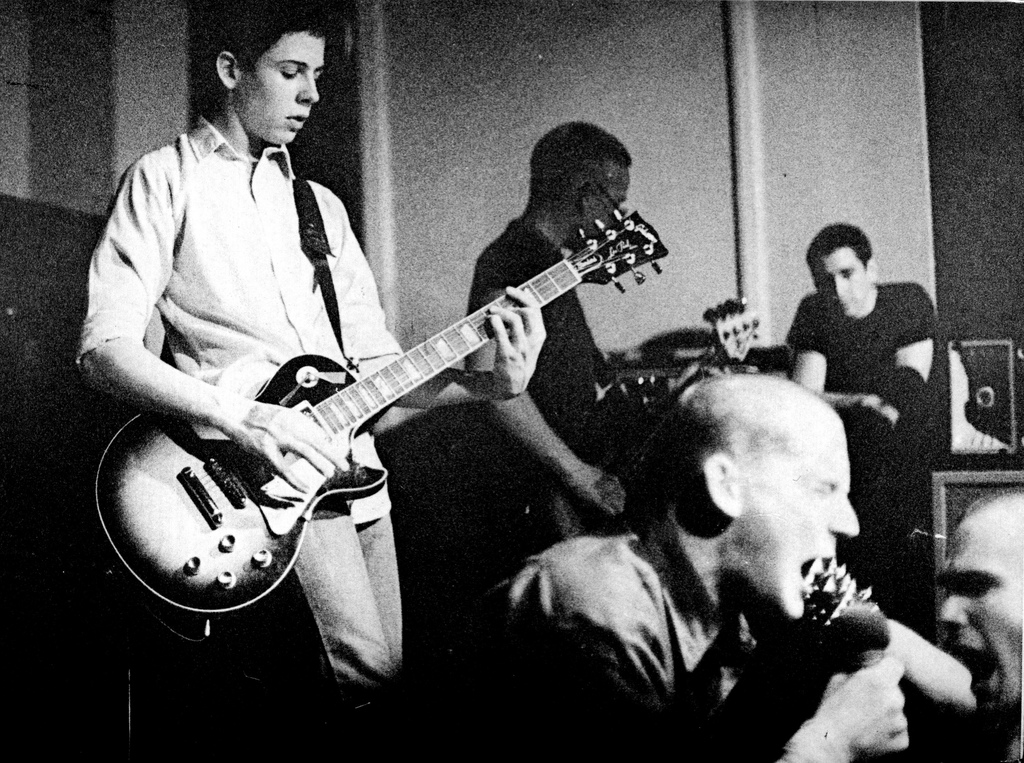
Baker (center) performing with Minor Threat live at the Wilson Center in Washington, D.C. in 1981

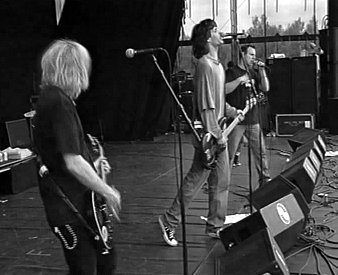
Baker (left) performing with Bad Religion live in the Netherlands in 1995

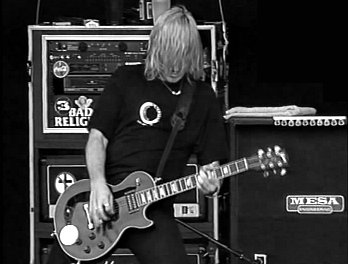
Baker performing with Bad Religion live in the Netherlands in 1995

=== Bad Religion ===
- The Gray Race (1996)
- Tested (1997)
- No Substance (1998)
- The New America (2000)
- The Process of Belief (2002)
- The Empire Strikes First (2004)
- New Maps of Hell (2007)
- The Dissent of Man (2010)
- True North (2013)
- Age of Unreason (2019)

=== Doggy Style ===
- The Last Laugh (1986)

=== Dag Nasty ===
- Can I Say (1986)
- Wig Out at Denko's (1987)
- All Ages Show 7" (1987)
- Field Day (1988)
- Trouble Is 12" (1988)
- 85-86 (1991)
- Four on the Floor (1992)
- Minority of One (2002)
- Dag with Shawn (2010)
- Cold Heart 7" (2016)

=== The Meatmen ===
- War of the Superbikes (1984)

=== Government Issue ===
- Make an Effort EP (1982)

=== Minor Threat ===
- Minor Threat EP (1981)
- In My Eyes EP (1981)
- Out of Step (1983)
- Salad Days EP (1985)

=== Junkyard ===
- Junkyard (1989)
- Sixes, Sevens & Nines (1991)
- Shut Up – We're Trying to Practice! (2000)
- Tried and True (2003)
- Faded/The River 7" (2015)
- High Water (2017)
- Old Habits Die Hard (2019)

=== Foxhall Stacks ===
- The Coming Collapse (2019)

=== Beach Rats ===
- Wasted Time 7" (2018)
- Rat Beat (2022)

=== Fake Names ===
- Fake Names (2020)
- Fake Names EP (2021)
- Expendables (2023)
