= The Process of Belief =

2002 studio album by Bad Religion

Studio album by Bad Religion
- Released: January 22, 2002
- Recorded: 2001
- Studios: Sound City, Westbeach Recorders (Los Angeles)
- Genres: Melodic hardcore; punk rock; skate punk
- Length: 36:47
- Label: Epitaph
- Producers: Brett Gurewitz, Greg Graffin

Bad Religion chronology
The New America (2000)	The Process of Belief (2002)	Punk Rock Songs (2002)

Singles from The Process of Belief
- 1. "Broken" Released: April 22, 2002

The Process of Belief is the twelfth studio album by American punk rock band Bad Religion. It was produced by its leaders Greg Graffin and Brett Gurewitz, and was released on January 22, 2002, through Epitaph Records. After touring in support of its previous studio album, The New America (2000), Gurewitz re-joined Bad Religion in 2001 after a seven-year hiatus. The band re-signed with Epitaph, and then began work on its first album for the label in over eight years. The album also marked the first album to feature Brooks Wackerman, who replaced former drummer Bobby Schayer.

The Process of Belief was commercially successful for Epitaph, debuting at number 49 on the Billboard 200 chart, and was well received by both critics and fans, who marked the album as a return to the faster and more energetic songwriting style of Bad Religion's earlier albums. The album has sold more than 220,000 units worldwide. The Process of Belief features one of Bad Religion's well-known songs "Sorrow", the band's first to chart in the US in six years, since "A Walk" (from 1996's The Gray Race). "Broken", "The Defense" and "Supersonic" also received radio airplay, but all failed to make any national chart (although "Broken" reached number 125 on the UK Singles Chart).

== Background and recording ==
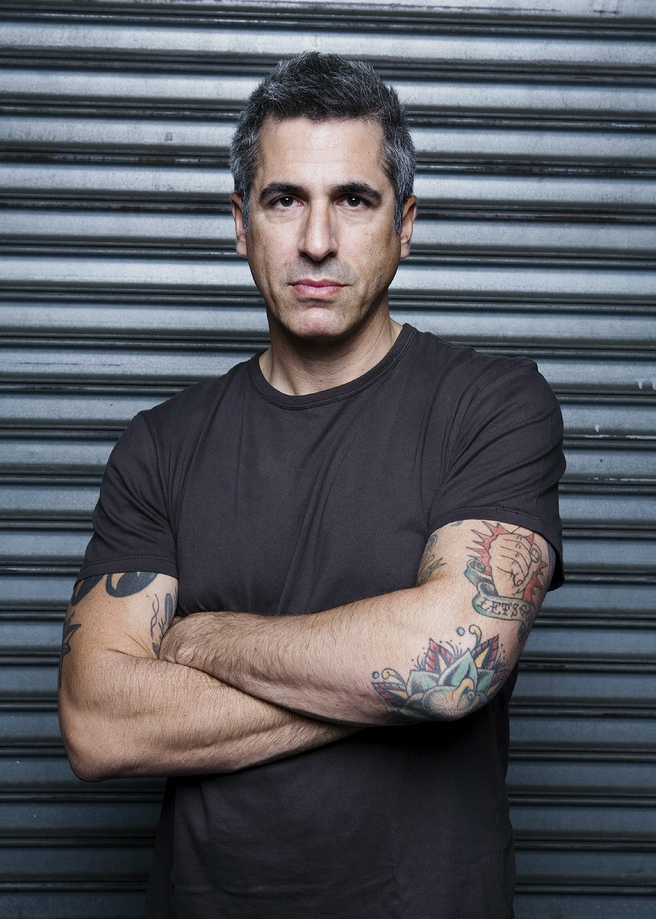
The Process of Belief marks Brett Gurewitz' return to the band in eight years since Stranger than Fiction.

Bad Religion released their eleventh studio album The New America in May 2000, through Atlantic Records. Bassist Jay Bentley said there was one day where the label was dropping acts that had sold under 50,000 copies; he said that Bad Religion had sold around 61,000 but had told them: "Please throw us off too. I don't want to be a part of this anymore." Bentley said no one in the band was happy while making The New America and had expected it to be their last album. In January 2001, it was reported that Epitaph Records and Bad Religion founder Brett Gurewitz had re-joined the band. He had left Bad Religion in 1994 to focus his efforts on Epitaph; he previously wrote "Believe It" for The New America. Alongside this, it was announced that Bad Religion had re-signed to Epitaph, who they left for Atlantic in 1993. In May 2001, it was announced that drummer Bobby Schayer had sustained an inoperable rotator cuff problem and had left the band as a result.

Throughout June 2001, Bad Religion toured across Europe; in the same month, Brooks Wackerman, formerly of Suicidal Tendencies and the Vandals, joined the band as their next drummer. In July 2001, the band said their next album would be titled The Process of Belief and was planned for release in a few months' time. Later in the month, Bad Religion recorded at Sound City Studios and Westbeach Recorders, both in Los Angeles, California, with Gurewitz and Graffin as producers. The band wanted to finish the album at a quicker pace as the band believe that a song loses its quality when overproduced. Gurewitz was critical of the previous producers the band worked with, stating that he understood them better than anyone. Billy Joe Bowers handled recording, while Jeff Mosis and Philip Brousard acted as assistant engineers.

In September 2001, Gurewitz mixed almost every track at Larrabee East except for "Epiphany", which was done by Jerry Finn. Bob Ludwig mastered the album at Gateway. Reflecting on the process, guitarist Brian Baker considered the production of The Process of Belief "amazingly easy and comfortable" considering Gurewitz' return to Bad Religion and the lack of conflict within the band. Baker described their typical songwriting process, stating that he would go to Gurewitz or Graffin's house, listen to their demo, and finish the song by adding the "personality of each band member." According to a Punkrocks.net interview, Bentley revealed that "Sorrow" was written "a while ago" and that by the time it was played on radio station KROQ, it had an unfinished state. He also revealed that the band recorded additional tracks that were left out of the album including "Who We Are" and "Shattered Faith".

== Music and lyrics ==
The Process of Belief is a melodic hardcore, punk rock, and skate punk album, which was compared to Bad Religion's sixth and seventh studio albums, Generator (1992) and Recipe for Hate (1993). In comparison to the expansive style of The New America, The Process of Belief returns to the band's "oppressively rigid formula." The album's title was taken from a lyric in "Materialist", which Gurewitz felt summarizes Bad Religion's name fittingly. In addition, Bentley stated that the title refers to a point where people "stop asking questions and accept things for what they are". The opening track, "Supersonic", discusses the speed at which life changes at an equally fast pace. "Broken" is a mid-tempo rock song, and is followed by "Destined for Nothing", which evokes parts of Recipe for Hate. "Materialist" is an anti-religious track; Gurewitz said it referred to "belief in God and the biological process that causes the belief in God." "Kyoto Now!" is about the Kyoto Protocol to reduce Greenhouse gases and pollution.

"Sorrow" was inspired by the biblical figure Job, with Gurewitz saying it was "very difficult to account for suffering in the world from a theological perspective". The song opens with a Police-esque ska beat, before switching to the band's typical melodic hardcore sound. "Epiphany" is a mid-tempo song that talks about the negatives of self-examination, and is similar in form to "Stickin in My Eye" (1992) by NOFX. The mid-tempo rock song "The Defense" criticizes the Patriot Act, and features sitar playing from Mikaleno. The opening guitar riff in "The Lie" recalled on the one heard in "I Want to Conquer the World", a track from the band's fourth studio album No Control (1989). "You Don't Belong" deals with the positives and negatives of nostalgia. The closing track, "Bored and Extremely Dangerous", is about the issues facing pre-Columbine youth.

== Promotion and release ==
In August 2001, The Process of Belief was delayed from October 2001 to early 2002, which Bentley said was due to the Epitaph's aversion to releasing albums during the holiday season. On October 5, 2001, the album's artwork was posted on the label's website. On October 31, "Sorrow" was made available for free download through the label's website, followed by "Can't Stop It" on November 15, through eMusic. On January 11, 2002, "Supersonic" was made available for free download through a microsite for the album. The Process of Belief was made available for streaming between January 18 and 22 before it was released on the latter day. To promote its release, Bad Religion held four releases shows across San Francisco and Los Angeles, California, and performed on Late Night with Conan O'Brien as a musical guest.

The music video for "Sorrow" was posted online on January 29, 2002. On February 8, the band performed "Sorrow" on The Late Late Show with Craig Kilborn. Following this, Bad Religion embarked on tour of Europe in February 2002, and a tour of the US in March, with support from Hot Water Music and Less Than Jake. In April 2002, the band performed at the Groezrock festival in Europe. "Broken" was released as a single on April 22, 2002; the CD version featured the non-album track "Shattered Faith", "Supersonic", and the music video for "Sorrow". Three days later, the music video for "Broken" was posted on the band's website. Between late June and mid-August, the group went on the 2002 edition of Warped Tour. In September, Bad Religion performed at the Inland Invasion festival. They were due to tour Australia and New Zealand in October; however, it was cancelled for unknown reasons. In April and May 2003, the band embarked on a US West Coast tour, with support from Sparta and Snapcase, and headlined the Slam City Jam. In September, Bad Religion went on another West Coast tour, which included several multi-day shows in different cities. Some of the shows were supported by the Living End, Maxeen, and Throw Rag.

== Commercial performance ==
The Process of Belief peaked at number 49 on the US Billboard 200 album chart, dated February 9, 2002, remaining on the chart for five weeks. The same day, the album topped the US Independent Albums chart for a week, remaining on the chart for nineteen weeks. In the United Kingdom, the album peaked at number fifteen on the Rock & Metal Albums chart and number 23 on the Independent Albums chart. In Canada, The Process of Belief peaked at number eight on the Alternative Albums chart, as well as number 27 on the main albums chart. Elsewhere, The Process of Belief appeared in album charts from Austria, Finland, Germany, Japan, Sweden, and Switzerland. For the year-end charts of 2002 in Canada, the album was ranked at number 59 on the Metal Albums chart and number 122 on the Alternative Albums chart.

== Critical reception ==
Professional ratings
Aggregate scores
Source	Rating
Metacritic	74/100
Review scores
Source	Rating
AllMusic	3/5 stars
Blender	3/5 stars
E! Online	B+
Entertainment Weekly	B
Pitchfork	5.1/10
Rolling Stone	3/5 stars
RTÉ	4/5 stars
Slant Magazine	3/5 stars
Yahoo! Launch	Favorable

The Process of Belief was met with generally favorable reviews from music critics. At Metacritic, which assigns a normalized rating out of 100 to reviews from mainstream publications, the album received an average score of 74, based on 13 reviews.

The staff at E! Online said Gurewitz's return to Bad Religion "prove[d] rejuvenating for all. With the combustible reunited dynamic" between Graffin and Gurewitz, "the band has energy and urgency anew". RTÉ reviewer Harry Guerin said that despite the members of Bad Religion were double the age of modern acts, the album "finds them growing old gracefully and highlights how much a new generation needs their open-your-eyes anthems." Entertainment Weekly write Jim Farber said the album had "catchier melodies and more breathlessly clever wordplay" than the band's previous releases. Joachim Hiller of Ox-Fanzine wrote that Bad Religion had "created the[ir] best album in years", having sidestepped the "mediocrity and insignificance" of their previous two "not really bad, but irrelevant albums". Yahoo! Launch's Rob O'Connor called it "a MY-T-FINE punk rock album, chock full of swirling harmonies", though there was "no real surprises here".

Phil Udell of Hot Press wrote that Bad Religion come across as "sounding as fresh and inspired as in their early days ... [with] sweet harmonies and a passionate belief in the power of music." Rolling Stone writer Tom Moon said the album had "fourteen throttling songs designed to remind Sum 41's worshippers about the oft-neglected cerebral side of punk." John Robb of Playlouder complimented its momentum and consistency, but noted that it felt predictable in Bad Religion's style rather than innovative. Slant Magazine contributor Aaron Scott found the album to be "supercharged with Gurewitz’s solid production and enough old school Bad Religion hooks to begin healing years of perceived misdirection," however, it was "not a big enough band-aid to cover all the cuts of time."

AllMusic reviewer Jack Rabid wrote that repeated listens of the album awards the listener with "brute, lashing power and wild honey melodies" that disarm "such critical impulses as efficiently as a martial arts master." Pitchfork's Rob Mitchum found that on occasion, Graffin and Gurewitz display a "strong hook-writing ability"; however, the majority of the album was "indistinguishable from anything post-No Control". Stephen Thompson of the A.V. Club considered The Process of Belief to have made the band "a lot easier to respect than to enjoy", stating that it felt more monotonous and lacked the passion of Bad Religion's previous works. Alternative Press ranked "Sorrow" at number 56 on their list of the best 100 singles from the 2000s.

== Track listing ==
All songs written by Greg Graffin and Brett Gurewitz.

No.	Title	Length
1.	"Supersonic"	1:46
2.	"Prove It"	1:14
3.	"Can't Stop It"	1:09
4.	"Broken"	2:54
5.	"Destined for Nothing"	2:35
6.	"Materialist"	1:53
7.	"Kyoto Now!"	3:19
8.	"Sorrow"	3:21
9.	"Epiphany"	3:59
10.	"Evangeline"	2:10
11.	"The Defense"	3:53
12.	"The Lie"	2:18
13.	"You Don't Belong"	2:49
14.	"Bored and Extremely Dangerous"	3:27
Total length:		36:47

== Personnel ==
Personnel per booklet.

Bad Religion

- Jay Bentley – bass, backing vocals
- Brian Baker – guitar
- Greg Graffin – lead and backing vocals
- Brett Gurewitz – guitar, backing vocals
- Greg Hetson – guitar
- Brooks Wackerman – drums

Additional musicians

- Mikaleno – sitar (track 11)

Production and design

- Brett Gurewitz – producer, mixing (all except track 9)
- Greg Graffin – producer
- Billy Joe Bowers – recording
- Jerry Finn – mixing (track 9)
- Jeff Moses – assistant engineer
- Phillip Brousard – assistant engineer
- Bob Ludwig – mastering
- Mackie Osborne – art direction, design
- Chris Martin – praying family illustration

== Charts ==
=== Weekly charts ===
Weekly chart performance for The Process of Belief
Chart (2002)	Peak position
Austrian Albums (Ö3 Austria)	41
Canadian Albums (Nielsen SoundScan)	27
Canadian Alternative Albums (Nielsen SoundScan)	8
Finnish Albums (Suomen virallinen lista)	35
German Albums (Offizielle Top 100)	13
Japanese Albums (Oricon)	50
Swedish Albums (Sverigetopplistan)	39
Swiss Albums (Schweizer Hitparade)	37
UK Independent Albums (Official Charts)	23
UK Rock & Metal Albums (Official Charts)	15
US Billboard 200	49
US Independent Albums (Billboard)	1

=== Year-end charts ===
Year-end chart performance for The Process of Belief
Chart (2002)	Position
Canadian Alternative Albums (Nielsen SoundScan)	122
Canadian Metal Albums (Nielsen SoundScan)	59
