= Greg Graffin =

American singer and academic

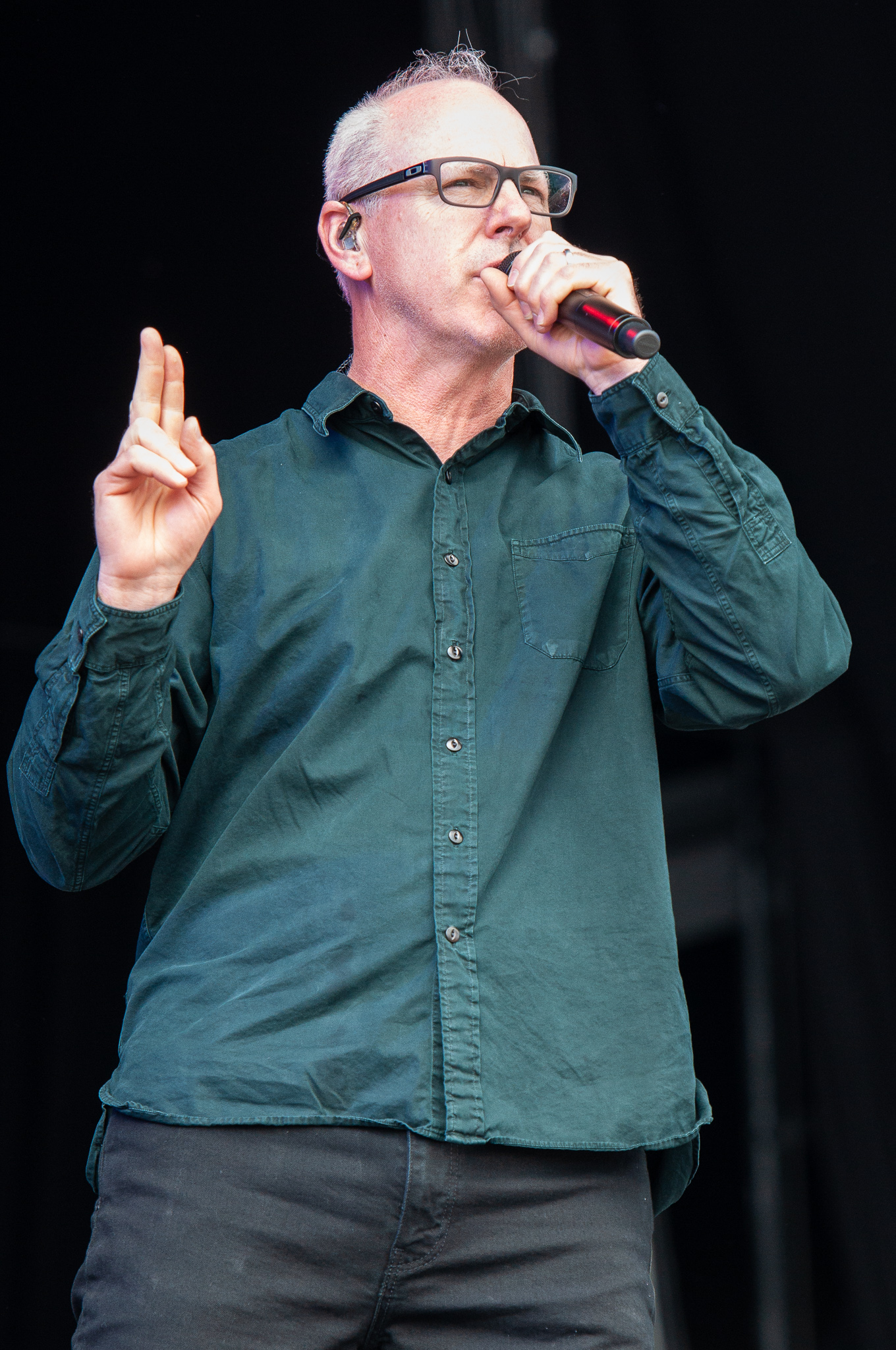
- Graffin performing with Bad Religion in 2018

Background information
- Born: Gregory Walter Graffin; November 6, 1964 (age 61); Madison, Wisconsin, U.S.
- Origin: Los Angeles, California, U.S.
- Genres: Punk rock; melodic hardcore; skate punk
- Occupations: Singer; songwriter; evolutionary biologist
- Years active: 1980–present
- Labels: Epitaph; Atlantic; ANTI-
- Member of: Bad Religion

Gregory Walter Graffin (born November 6, 1964) is an American singer who is the lead vocalist and only constant member of the punk band Bad Religion, which he co-founded in 1980. He has also released three solo albums.

Graffin obtained his PhD in zoology at Cornell University and has lectured courses in natural sciences both at the University of California, Los Angeles and at Cornell University.

Graffin was born in Madison, Wisconsin, and spent part of his childhood in Milwaukee and Racine. He later moved with his family to California, where his mother settled in the San Fernando Valley. Graffin became involved in the emerging Southern California punk scene during his teenage years.

== Career ==
=== Bad Religion ===
In 1980, at the age of 15, Graffin and a few high school classmates formed Bad Religion in Southern California's San Fernando Valley. After making a name for themselves in the Los Angeles punk scene, releasing two EPs and two full-length albums, they disbanded around 1985. However, Bad Religion reformed in 1986 with a new line-up, consisting of Graffin on vocals, Brett Gurewitz and Greg Hetson on guitars, Jay Bentley on bass, and Pete Finestone on drums. In 1988, they released Suffer, which was a comeback for Bad Religion as well as a watershed for the Southern California punk sound popularized by guitarist Gurewitz's Epitaph Records. The reunion line-up made two more records before Finestone left the band in 1991.

Bad Religion has been known for its articulate and often politically charged lyrics as well as its fast-paced harmony, melody and counterpoint. Graffin and Gurewitz are the band's two main songwriters, though Graffin wrote the bulk of the material on his own for a three-album period in the late 1990s. Gurewitz had left the band in 1994 to concentrate on the future of Epitaph.

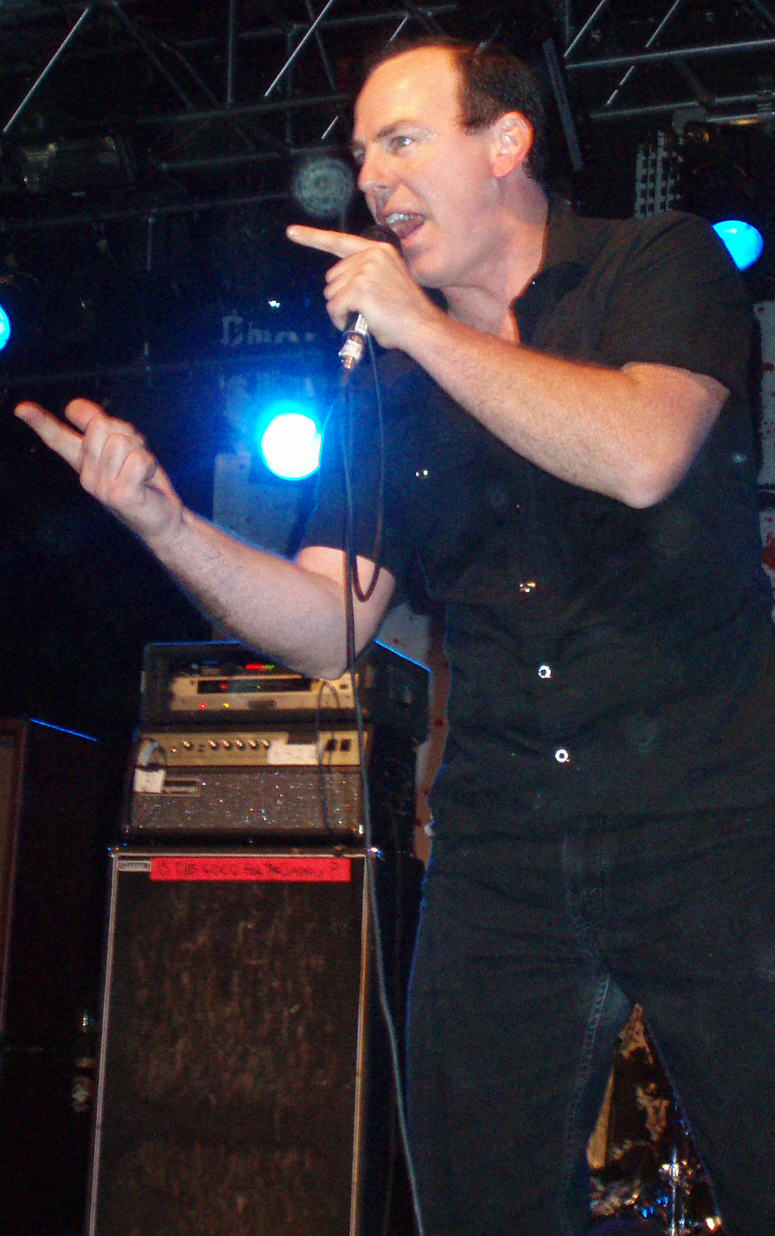
Graffin with Bad Religion in 2007 at the Starland Ballroom, New Jersey

After a stint with major label Atlantic Records ended in the early 2000s, Bad Religion re-signed with Epitaph, and Gurewitz rejoined. They have since continued to co-write songs and recorded six records: The Process of Belief (2002), The Empire Strikes First (2004), New Maps of Hell (2007), The Dissent of Man (2010), True North (2013), and their latest, Age of Unreason (2019)

=== Solo career ===
Graffin recorded a solo album in 1997, called American Lesion, which consisted of softer, more pop-oriented folk songs. Most of this album was written during the breakup of his marriage, and the songs reflect this in lyrics and style.

In 2005, Graffin recorded his second solo album, Cold as the Clay. The album is an amalgamation of new songs by Graffin and 18th- and 19th-century American folk songs. It was produced by Brett Gurewitz and released via ANTI- on July 10, 2006.

In a September 2015 interview, Graffin said that he had been working on his third solo album, on which he planned to continue the folk style of Cold as the Clay. That record, Millport, was released on March 10, 2017. It was co-written and produced by Gurewitz and features members of Social Distortion as backing musicians.

== Academics ==
Graffin attended El Camino Real High School, then obtained both his BA Biology, BS Geology and master's in Geology at the University of California, Los Angeles (UCLA). In 2003 he went on to earn his PhD in Zoology from Cornell University. The PhD dissertation was supervised by William B. Provine. After years of being out-of-print, the title of his dissertation changed to "Evolution and Religion: Questioning the Beliefs of the World's Eminent Evolutionists".

Graffin returned to UCLA where he taught natural science courses. In a June 2008 interview with Bad Religion bassist Jay Bentley, he mentioned that Graffin would be teaching there from January to March 2009. In April 2011, Graffin said that he would return to Cornell University that fall to co-teach for 14 weeks.

In 2011 the new type species Qiliania graffini of an extinct bird from the lower Cretaceous was named after Graffin "for his contributions to evolutionary biology, his public out-reach through music, and his inspiration to young scientists around the world".

=== Work as an author and educator ===
Graffin received the Rushdie Award for Cultural Humanism from the Harvard Humanist Chaplaincy in 2008.

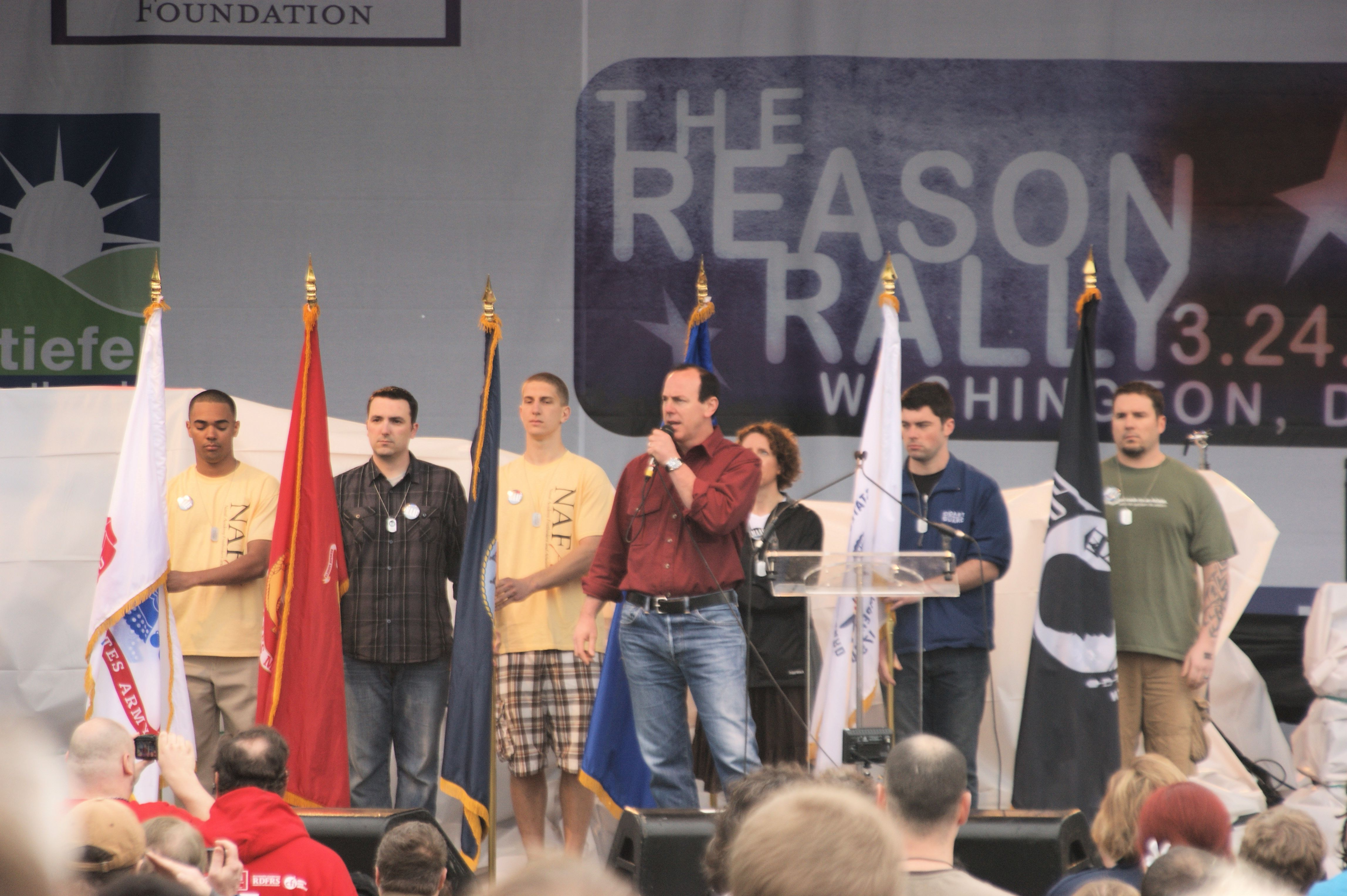
Graffin sings the National Anthem at the Reason Rally, National Mall, Washington, D.C., 2012

Throughout 2003, Graffin was engaged in an ongoing email discussion with Preston Jones, a historian at the Christian John Brown University in Arkansas and fan of Bad Religion. The informal philosophical debate that resulted was published as a book titled Is Belief in God Good, Bad or Irrelevant? A Professor and Punk Rocker Discuss Science, Religion, Naturalism & Christianity in 2006.

In 2009, Graffin announced that he had co-written a book with American author Steve Olson titled Anarchy Evolution, released on September 28, 2010 (the same day his band Bad Religion released their 15th album The Dissent of Man). In his book, Graffin writes that he is an atheist: "I've never believed in God, which technically makes me an atheist". Although Graffin is not religious, he prefers to identify as a naturalist rather than as an atheist. "Naturalism is a belief system. A lot of scientists bristle at that. We all have to believe we can find the truth. Evidence is my guide. I rely on observation, experimentation and verification." He also filmed and co-produced a television pilot called Punk Professor.

In 2010, he commented on the project, "It's sitting on someone's shelf waiting to be developed. I'm not actually pursuing it. I said, yeah, I'll shoot the pilot, then it's out of my hands."

On March 24, 2012, Bad Religion headlined the Reason Rally in Washington, D.C., where Graffin performed the U.S. national anthem.

In 2014, Graffin received the Humanist Arts Award from the American Humanist Association.

Another book entitled Population Wars was released in September 2015. It had been in the works since at least April 2011 and Graffin spoke about it to be "a bit more in depth about the process of evolution". In a November 2015 interview with PopMatters journalist J.C. Maçek III for Graffin's book Population Wars, Graffin stated, "I've made a lot of mistakes, but you can't dwell on mistakes because life is about an adventure. It's about discovery. And you learn from your mistakes so unless you're completely shut down to improving your life, I believe you can continue learning until you're very, very old. You have to look at those past missteps as learning experiences."

== Discography ==
=== Bad Religion ===
Studio albums

- How Could Hell Be Any Worse? (1982)
- Into the Unknown (1983)
- Suffer (1988)
- No Control (1989)
- Against the Grain (1990)
- Generator (1992)
- Recipe for Hate (1993)
- Stranger than Fiction (1994)
- The Gray Race (1996)
- No Substance (1998)
- The New America (2000)
- The Process of Belief (2002)
- The Empire Strikes First (2004)
- New Maps of Hell (2007)
- The Dissent of Man (2010)
- True North (2013)
- Age of Unreason (2019)

=== Solo ===
- American Lesion (1997)
- Cold as the Clay (2006)
- Millport (2017)

== Bibliography ==
- A new locality of fossiliferous Harding Sandstone: evidence for freshwater Ordovician vertebrates, Journal of Vertebrate Paleontology, vol. 12, issue 1, pgs. 1–10. (1992)
- Evolution, Monism, Atheism and the Naturalist World-View, Polypterus Press (2004)
- Is Belief in God Good, Bad, or Irrelevant?, with Preston Jones (2006)
- Evolution, Religion and Free Will, with William Provine, American Scientist, vol. 95, issue 4, p. 294 (2007)
- Evolution and Religion: Questioning the Beliefs of the World's Eminent Evolutionists, Polypterus Press, Ithaca, N.Y. (2010)
- Anarchy Evolution: Faith, Science, and Bad Religion in a World Without God, with Steve Olson (2010)
- Population Wars: A New Perspective on Competition and Coexistence (2015)
- Punk Paradox: A Memoir, Hachette Books, New York (2022)

== Taxon named in his honor ==
- Sturisoma graffini is a species of catfish in the family Loricariidae. It is native to South America, where it occurs in the Madre de Dios River basin in Peru.

== See also ==
- List of artists and entertainers with advanced degrees
