= The New America =

Studio album by Bad Religion
- Released: May 9, 2000
- Recorded: October–December 1999
- Studio: Victor's Barn, Kauaʻi, Hawaii
- Genre: Pop-punk
- Length: 40:11
- Label: Atlantic
- Producer: Todd Rundgren

Bad Religion chronology
No Substance (1998)	The New America (2000)	The Process of Belief (2002)

International edition cover

The New America is the eleventh studio album by punk band Bad Religion. It was released in 2000 and is their last album (to date) on Atlantic Records.

The New America is also Bad Religion's last album with Bobby Schayer on drums. Though not yet credited as a member of the band, then-former and now-current guitarist Brett Gurewitz co-wrote and played guitar on the song "Believe It". The album was re-released by Epitaph Records on September 15, 2008. Like its predecessor, none of the album's songs would develop into live staples; only the title track is performed live occasionally.

== Musical style and lyrics ==
The album was initially titled The Last Word, before being changed to The New America as a large number of people thought the band was breaking up. The album marks a departure for the band, as some of the songs are personal, rather than political in nature, and more optimism is employed. Topics range from singer Greg Graffin's recent divorce to his past growing up as a punk kid in the early '80s. Apart from Brett Gurewitz's guest contribution, it is the only Bad Religion album solely written by Graffin.

== Production ==
The New America was recorded from October to December 1999 at Victor's Barn, Kauaʻi, Hawaii and produced by Todd Rundgren. Rundgren had been one of the musicians Greg Graffin looked up to while growing up. However, working with Rundgren proved to be a disappointment to the band and especially Graffin, because they did not get along well with each other. Graffin however would later write in his book, Anarchy Evolution, that although Rundgren was difficult to work with, they remain friends to this day. Graffin reflected on the recording of The New America with Rundgren in an even more positive light in his 2023 memoir Punk Rock Paradox, calling it a "great experience."

== Release ==
The New America was released on May 9, 2000, and is the last Bad Religion album distributed via Atlantic Records to date. The release of The New America marked the band's fulfillment of their four-album contract with Atlantic Records, allowing the band to reconvene with former band-mate Brett Gurewitz for their next album, 2002's The Process of Belief, released on Epitaph Records. Shortly after the album's release, a music video was made for "New America", which features two children playing with action figures of the band. The band promoted it with a supporting slot for Blink-182, and appeared on The Late Late Show with Craig Kilborn and Core Culture. In March 2001, the band toured South America, supporting Biohazard for two of the shows.

== Reception ==
Professional ratings
Review scores
Source	Rating
AllMusic	4/5 stars
Alternative Rock	9/10
Robert Christgau	(dud)
Ox-Fanzine	Unfavorable
Rolling Stone	2.5/5 stars
Wall of Sound	63/100

The New America peaked at number 88 on the Billboard 200 album chart. Author Dave Thompson, in his book Alternative Rock (2000), wrote that working with Rundgren "opens the band's already wide-screen sound into a whole new dimension of sonic insanity."

== Track listing ==
All tracks are written by Greg Graffin, except where noted.

No.	Title	Writer(s)	Length
1.	"You've Got a Chance"		3:41
2.	"It's a Long Way to the Promise Land"		2:29
3.	"A World Without Melody"		2:32
4.	"New America"		3:25
5.	"1000 Memories"		3:00
6.	"A Streetkid Named Desire"		3:17
7.	"Whisper in Time"		2:32
8.	"Believe It"	Graffin, Brett Gurewitz	3:41
9.	"I Love My Computer"		3:06
10.	"The Hopeless Housewife"		2:59
11.	"There Will Be a Way"		2:53
12.	"Let It Burn"		2:44
13.	"Don't Sell Me Short"		3:58

Japanese and European bonus tracks
No.	Title	Length
14.	"The Fast Life"	2:01
15.	"Queen of the 21st Century"	4:17

Non-album B-sides
No.	Title	Appears on	Length
1.	"Lose as Directed"	"New America" single, 2000	2:30
2.	"Pretenders"	"New America" single, 2000	4:12

== Personnel ==
Adapted from the album liner notes.

Bad Religion

- Greg Graffin – lead vocals, backing vocals
- Greg Hetson – guitar
- Brian Baker – guitar, backing vocals
- Jay Bentley – bass guitar, backing vocals
- Bobby Schayer – drums

Additional musicians

- Brett Gurewitz – lead guitar on "Believe It" (credited as "Mr. Brett")
- Todd Rundgren – backing vocals
- John Rubeli – backing vocals

Technical

- Todd Rundgren – producer, engineer
- Bob Clearmountain – mixing
- David Boucher – assistant mixing engineer
- Christina Dittmar – design
- Joe Murray – illustration
- FreeStockPhotos – photography (front cover)
- Olaf Heine – photography (band photos)

== Charts ==
Chart (2000)	Peak position
Austrian Albums (Ö3 Austria)	47
Finnish Albums (Suomen virallinen lista)	38
German Albums (Offizielle Top 100)	16
Swedish Albums (Sverigetopplistan)	53
Swiss Albums (Schweizer Hitparade)	69
US Billboard 200	88
