= Brooks Wackerman =

American drummer (born 1977)

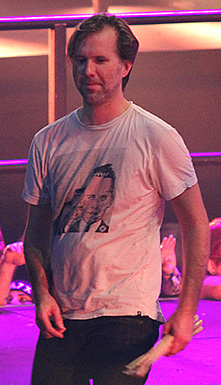
- Wackerman with Avenged Sevenfold in 2017

Background information
- Born: February 15, 1977 (age 49); Long Beach, California, U.S.
- Genres: Heavy metal; punk rock; progressive metal; funk metal
- Occupation: Musician
- Instrument: Drums
- Years active: 1990–present
- Member of: Avenged Sevenfold; Mass Mental; Big Talk
- Formerly of: Bad Religion; Bad4Good; Suicidal Tendencies; Infectious Grooves; Fear and the Nervous System

Brooks Wackerman (born February 15, 1977) is an American musician. He is the current drummer of metal band Avenged Sevenfold, which he joined in 2015.

His first album with Avenged Sevenfold was The Stage (2016). He was previously the drummer for the punk rock band Bad Religion (2001 to 2015) and the main touring drummer for Tenacious D (2006 to 2015).

Wackerman has also performed, either as a member or a session or touring member, with Blink-182, Bad4Good, Infectious Grooves, Glenn Tipton, Mass Mental, Suicidal Tendencies, the Vandals, Avril Lavigne, Korn, Kidneys (in which he sang and played guitar, releasing two albums), Fear and the Nervous System, Farmikos, Tom Delonge, and Big Talk.

Wackerman's brothers Chad Wackerman and John Wackerman are also drummers.

== Early life ==
Wackerman's father Chuck, also a drummer, started teaching him how to play drums as early as five years old and was also his jazz band teacher at Los Alamitos High School, winning Most Outstanding Musician at the Reno Jazz Festival in 1993. Wackerman started his musical career as a teen with a group called Bad4Good in 1991. The band released one album in 1992 called Refugee, produced by Steve Vai.

== Career ==
=== Infectious Grooves (1993–present) ===
From 1993 to 2000, Wackerman was a member of Infectious Grooves, playing drums on the albums Groove Family Cyco in 1994 and Mas Borracho in 2000 as well as touring with the band. He returned to the band when they resumed activities and did a show in Brazil in November 2019.

=== Suicidal Tendencies (1996–2001) ===
Wackerman was a member of Suicidal Tendencies from 1996 to 2001, playing drums on Six the Hard Way in 1998, Freedumb in 1999, and Free Your Soul and Save My Mind in 2000. He left the band to join Bad Religion in 2001.

=== Bad Religion (2001–2015) ===
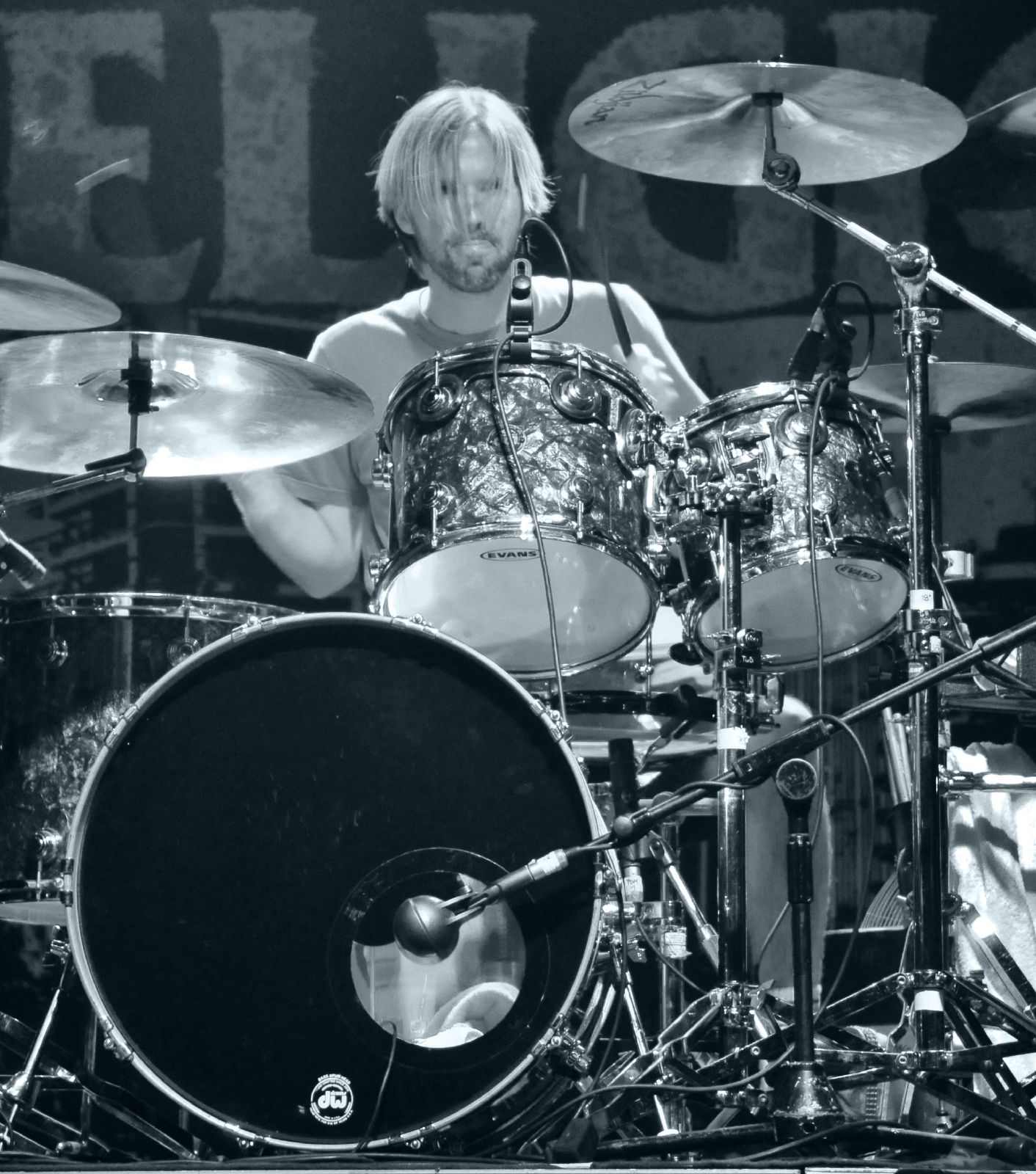
Wackerman with Bad Religion in 2008

In 2001, he became the drummer for Bad Religion, replacing Bobby Schayer who left the band due to a shoulder injury. Wackerman appeared on five albums with the band (The Process of Belief, The Empire Strikes First, New Maps of Hell, The Dissent of Man and True North), as well as their 2013 Christmas Songs EP. On October 27, 2015, Brooks left Bad Religion, deciding it was time to pursue another path.

=== Tenacious D (2006–2015) ===
In 2006, for The Pick of Destiny tour, Wackerman was selected to feature as the drummer for Tenacious D due to his previous work on the Vandals' Look What I Almost Stepped In... album, which both Jack Black and Kyle Gass cameo on. He would go on to play for Tenacious D at various festivals as well as support act and benefit concerts throughout 2008 to 2011. in 2012, Wackerman played with Tenacious D again on their Rize of the Fenix tour where he got the nickname "Thunderskin" from Jack Black for comical remark, making appearances on the Late Show with David Letterman, Late Night with Jimmy Fallon, The Tonight Show with Jay Leno and The Daily Show with Jon Stewart. They also performed at the 2012 Rock am Ring Festival. Wackerman also appeared in the music videos for their songs "Roadie" and "Rize of the Fenix". He would perform on their 2012 EP Tenacious D Jazz and their 2015 live album Tenacious D Live.

=== Avenged Sevenfold (2015–present) ===
On November 4, 2015, it was revealed that Wackerman was the new drummer for Avenged Sevenfold. Brooks was working with the band one year prior to the official announcement because the band wanted to "fit in" with the new drummer. Like his predecessors Mike Portnoy and Arin Ilejay, but unlike the rest of the band members, he doesn't have a stage name. His first full-length album with the band was their October 2016 release The Stage, which showcased his progressive metal style of drumming, often using fast double kicks and blast beats.

=== Other projects ===
Alongside Terry Bozzio, Wackerman contributed drums and percussion for Korn's untitled album. Wackerman is also the drummer for the Innocent, a thrash metal band featuring bassist Ryan Sinn (formerly of Angels & Airwaves and the Distillers), vocalist Brandan Schieppati (Bleeding Through), and guitarist Dave Nassie (No Use for a Name). In March 2008, Wackerman joined Korn guitarist James "Munky" Shaffer's newest solo project, experimental industrial rock band Fear and the Nervous System, alongside vocalist Steve Krolikowski (Repeater), Billy Gould (Faith No More), Leopold Ross (Error), and Zac Baird (Korn, Billy Goat). Brooks also played drums for Avril Lavigne. Brooks filled in for Travis Barker during Blink-182's 2013 tour of Australia in the Soundwave festival as well as their sideshows. Brooks was hired to record drums on Blink-182 member Tom DeLonge's debut solo album To the Stars... Demos, Odds and Ends.

Wackerman formerly fronted Kidneys alongside fellow Tenacious D band member John Spiker. Initially, his brother, John Wackerman played with Kidneys, but he would later be replaced by Todd Hennig (Death by Stereo). A full-length self-titled album was released in 2007, and another album in 2012, entitled Hold Your Fire, is available for digital download. The band parted ways in 2012.

Wackerman appeared in the Suicide Machines' "S.O.S." music video in place of drummer Derek Grant, due to Grant's refusal to appear in photos or videos.

== Gear ==
Wackerman currently endorses Drum Workshop drums, Remo drumheads and also uses Innovative Percussion drumsticks. Additionally, in 2021, after many years of using and endorsing Zildjian cymbals Wackerman officially signed on as an Istanbul Agop artist. He also once had a signature line of drumsticks manufactured by Zildjian as well.

Drum setup circa 2015 (Avenged Sevenfold tour): Drum Workshop drums, Evans drumheads and Zildjian cymbals and sticks:

Drums: Drum Workshop collector's series w/ maple/mahogany shells in black ice finish:

- 22"x16" bass drums (x2)
- 6"x12" rata drums (x2)
- 10"x8" rack tom
- 12"x9" rack tom
- 13"x9" rack tom
- 15"x13" floor tom
- 16"x14" floor tom
- 14"x6.5" nickel over brass snare

Drumheads: Evans:

- Snare: ST dry/300 snare side
- Toms: G2 clear/G1 clear
- Bass: EQ4 clear/EQ3 reso black

Cymbals: Zildjian:

- 21" A mega bell ride (left side)
- 15" A Custom hi-hats
- 20" A Custom EFX
- 19" A Custom crash
- 14" FX Oriental china "trash"/12" K splash (stacked)
- 19" A Custom crash
- 22" S rock ride or 22" S medium ride
- 15" A Custom hi-hats
- 20" S trash crash
- 19" A ultra-hammered china

Sticks:

- Zildjian Brooks Wackerman signature

Drum setup 2021 (current): Drum Workshop drums, Remo drumheads, Innovative Percussion drumsticks and Istanbul Agop cymbals:

Drums: Drum Workshop collector's series w/ maple shells in black ice or cherry finish:

- 22"x18" bass drums (x2)
- 10"x8" rack tom
- 12"x10" rack tom
- 13"x10" rack tom
- 14"x12" floor tom
- 16"x14" floor tom
- 14"x5.5" bronze snare
- 14"x7" maple snare

Drumheads: Remo:

- Snare: Powerstroke 77 clear/Ambassador hazy snare side
- Toms: Controlled Sound clear black dot or Emperor coated/Ambassador clear
- Bass: Powerstroke P3 clear

Cymbals: Istanbul Agop:

- 18" Xist china or 20" Xist china
- 15" Mantra hi-hats
- 8" Xist Brilliant bell
- 19" Xist Brilliant crash
- 14" Traditional trash hit stack
- 19" Xist Brilliant crash or 20" Traditional heavy crash
- 24" Joey Waronker ride
- 15" Xist Dry Dark hi-hats
- 20" Agop Signature china

Sticks:

- Innovative Percussion Brooks Wackerman A7X signature sticks

== Discography ==
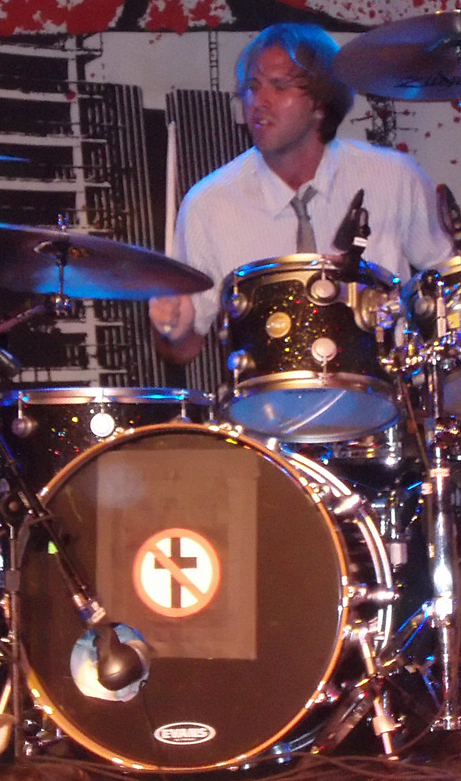
Wackerman performing with Bad Religion in 2007

=== With Avenged Sevenfold ===
- Avenged Sevenfold – "Jade Helm Score" from Call of Duty: Black Ops III (2015)
- Avenged Sevenfold – The Stage (2016)
- Avenged Sevenfold – The Stage Deluxe Edition (2017)
- Avenged Sevenfold – "Mad Hatter" from Call of Duty: Black Ops 4 (2018)
- Avenged Sevenfold – Life Is But a Dream... (2023)

=== With Mass Mental ===
- Mass Mental – How to Write Love Songs (1999)

=== With Bad Religion ===
- Bad Religion – The Process of Belief (2002)
- Bad Religion – The Empire Strikes First (2004)
- Bad Religion – New Maps of Hell (2007)
- Bad Religion – The Dissent of Man (2010)
- Bad Religion – True North (2013)
- Bad Religion – Christmas Songs (2013)

=== With Tenacious D ===
- Tenacious D – Jazz (2012)
- Tenacious D – Tenacious D Live (2015)

=== With Suicidal Tendencies ===
- Suicidal Tendencies – Prime Cuts (new recordings only)
- Suicidal Tendencies – Freedumb (1999)
- Suicidal Tendencies – Free Your Soul and Save My Mind (2000)

=== With Infectious Grooves ===
- Infectious Grooves – Groove Family Cyco (1994)
- Infectious Grooves – Mas Borracho (2000)
- Infectious Grooves – Take U on a Ride EP (2020)

=== Other ===
- Bad4Good – Refugee (1992)
- Glenn Tipton – Baptizm of Fire (1997)
- The Vandals – Look What I Almost Stepped In (2000)
- Hot Potty – One Step Closer to Broadway (with Josh Freese) (2002)
- Avril Lavigne – Under My Skin (2004)
- Korn – Untitled (2007)
- Kidneys – Kidneys (2007)
- Fear and the Nervous System – Fear and the Nervous System (2011)
- Kidneys – Hold Your Fire (2012)
- Farmikos – Farmikos (2014)
- Tom DeLonge – To the Stars... Demos, Odds and Ends (2015)
- Big Talk – Straight In No Kissin' (2015)
