= The Empire Strikes First =

Studio album by Bad Religion
- Released: June 8, 2004
- Recorded: November 2003 – February 2004
- Studios: Sound City, Los Angeles
- Genres: Melodic hardcore, punk rock, skate punk
- Length: 39:38
- Label: Epitaph
- Producers: Brett Gurewitz, Greg Graffin

Bad Religion chronology
Punk Rock Songs (2002)	The Empire Strikes First (2004)	New Maps of Hell (2007)

Singles from The Empire Strikes First
- 1. "Los Angeles Is Burning" Released: April 27, 2004; 2. "The Empire Strikes First" Released: 2004

The Empire Strikes First is the thirteenth studio album by American punk rock band Bad Religion, released on June 8, 2004. The album is heavily influenced by the then-current Iraq War (most notably in the songs "Atheist Peace", "Let Them Eat War" and the title track) and also has some nods to George Orwell's novel Nineteen Eighty-Four (the song title "Boot Stamping on a Human Face Forever" as well as the line "you deserve Two Minute Hate" in the title track are direct references to the book), the latter most likely inspired by the Patriot Act.

The album also marks the rare instance that non-members of Bad Religion received a writing credit, as Chris Wollard of Hot Water Music co-wrote two songs.

The song "Social Suicide" appears in the video games Tony Hawk's Project 8 and MX vs. ATV Untamed.

== Release ==
On February 4, 2004, The Empire Strikes First was announced for release in a few months' time. On March 17, 2004, the album's artwork and the track listing were posted online. "Sinister Rouge" was made available for download through the label's website on April 11, 2004. "Los Angeles Is Burning" was released to radio on April 27, 2004. They toured Europe in May 2004, where they debuted several new songs from the album. The Empire Strikes First was released on June 8, 2004. The following day, the music video for "Los Angeles Is Burning" was posted on the label's website. Soon afterwards, they appeared at the KROQ Weenie Roast. In October and November 2004, the band went on a tour of the US with Rise Against and From First to Last. After playing a series of multi-day stints in venues in the US in June 2005, Bad Religion toured across Europe in August and September 2005, which included an appearance at the Reading and Leeds Festivals. In October and November 2005, they went on a North American trek with Anti-Flag and Pennywise.

== Reception ==
Professional ratings
Aggregate scores
Source	Rating
Metacritic	70/100
Review scores
Source	Rating
AllMusic	3/5 stars
Chart Attack	Favorable
Robert Christgau	(choice cut)
IGN	9/10
Pitchfork	8.2/10
Rolling Stone	3/5 stars
RTÉ	4/5 stars

It peaked at number 40 on the Billboard 200 album chart, the highest position the band had attained at the time. The album scored a minor radio hit with, "Los Angeles Is Burning", which also reached No. 40 on the Billboard Modern Rock Tracks chart. Alternative Press ranked "Los Angeles Is Burning" at number 90 on their list of the best 100 singles from the 2000s.

== Track listing ==
Songwriting credits adapted from the album liner notes.

All tracks are written by Greg Graffin and Brett Gurewitz, except where noted.

No.	Title	Writer(s)	Length
1.	"Overture"		1:09
2.	"Sinister Rouge"		1:53
3.	"Social Suicide"		1:35
4.	"Atheist Peace"		1:57
5.	"All There Is"		2:57
6.	"Los Angeles Is Burning"		3:23
7.	"Let Them Eat War"	Graffin, Gurewitz, Brian Baker, Jay Bentley, Brooks Wackerman, Sage Francis	2:57
8.	"God's Love"		2:32
9.	"To Another Abyss"		4:07
10.	"The Quickening"	Graffin, Gurewitz, Wackerman, Chris Wollard	2:19
11.	"The Empire Strikes First"	Graffin, Gurewitz, Baker	3:23
12.	"Beyond Electric Dreams"	Graffin, Gurewitz, Wackerman, Wollard	4:02
13.	"Boot Stamping on a Human Face Forever"		3:49
14.	"Live Again (The Fall of Man)"		3:35

Japanese bonus track
No.	Title	Length
15.	"The Surface of Me"	3:01

== Personnel ==
Adapted from the album liner notes.

=== Bad Religion ===
- Greg Graffin – lead vocals, producer
- Greg Hetson – guitar
- Brian Baker – guitar, backing vocals
- Brett Gurewitz – guitar, backing vocals, producer
- Jay Bentley – bass guitar, backing vocals
- Brooks Wackerman – drums, percussion

=== Additional personnel ===
==== Musicians ====
- David Bragger – violin on "Atheist Peace"
- Mike Campbell – guitar on "Los Angeles is Burning"
- Sage Francis – guest vocals on "Let Them Eat War"
- John Ginty – Hammond B-3 on "Los Angeles is Burning"
- Leopold Ross – Sonic Alienator on "Beyond Electric Dreams"
- Claude Sarne – goth choir soprano on "Sinister Rouge"
- Atticus Ross – programming

==== Other ====
- Joe Barresi – engineer, mixing
- Tom Baker – mastering
- Pete Martinez – assistant engineer
- June Murakawa – assistant engineer
- Nick Pritchard – design
- Sean Murphy – photography
- Matt Rubin – photography

== Release history ==
Country	Release date
United Kingdom	June 7, 2004
Worldwide	June 7, 2004
United States	June 8, 2004

== Charts ==
Chart (2004)	Peak position
Australian Albums (ARIA Charts)	84
Dutch Albums (Album Top 100)	99
French Albums (SNEP)	177
German Albums (Offizielle Top 100)	28
Japanese Albums (Oricon)	45
Swedish Albums (Sverigetopplistan)	42
Swiss Albums (Schweizer Hitparade)	82
UK Independent Albums (Official Charts)	11
UK Rock & Metal Albums (Official Charts)	14
US Billboard 200	40
US Independent Albums (Billboard)	2
