= Punk Rock Songs =

Greatest hits album by Bad Religion
- Released: April 30, 2002
- Recorded: 1994–2000
- Genre: Punk rock
- Length: 69:28
- Label: Epic
- Producer: Bad Religion; Ric Ocasek; Todd Rundgren; Alex Perialas; Ronnie Kimball; Andy Wallace; Greg Graffin

Bad Religion chronology
The Process of Belief (2002)	Punk Rock Songs (2002)	The Empire Strikes First (2004)

Punk Rock Songs (The Epic Years) is a compilation album by Bad Religion, released in 2002. All songs on this compilation are from their tenure on Atlantic and Epic Records from 1994 to 2000, in addition to four live tracks and both the English and German versions of "Punk Rock Song". Punk Rock Songs was released by Epic without any input from the band members, as Bad Religion had already returned to Epitaph Records, and as of 2017, it has not been released in the United States.

== Background ==
While the first Bad Religion compilation album All Ages contains material from their 1982 debut How Could Hell Be Any Worse? to 1992's Generator, Punk Rock Songs almost takes off from that point, including material from Stranger than Fiction (1994) up through The New America (2000). It was during this period of their career that Bad Religion had risen in popularity. Like All Ages, Punk Rock Songs contains live tracks and omits anything from Recipe for Hate, which was released between Generator and Stranger than Fiction.

Although this compilation album was released after The Process of Belief, it contains no songs from that album as Bad Religion had switched record labels by that time.

== Critical reception ==
Professional ratings
Review scores
Source	Rating
AllMusic	4/5 stars

Writing for AllMusic, Gregory Heaney felt that Punk Rock Songs contains some of Bad Religion's most instantly recognizable songs. He wrote that the compilation "is a great introduction to the band's work, and makes for an incredibly solid compilation of essential punk listening."

== Track listing ==
All tracks are written by Greg Graffin, except where noted.

1. "Punk Rock Song" – 2:27
2. "The Gray Race" (Graffin, Brian Baker) – 2:06
3. "The Streets of America" (Graffin, Baker) – 3:50
4. "A Walk" – 2:09
5. "Ten in 2010" – 2:23
6. "New America" – 3:24
7. "I Love My Computer" – 3:05
8. "It's A Long Way to the Promise Land" – 2:28
9. "Hear It" – 1:49
10. "Raise Your Voice" (with Campino) – 2:55
11. "No Substance" – 3:04
12. "Infected" (Brett Gurewitz) – 4:08
13. "21st Century (Digital Boy)" (Gurewitz) – 2:47
14. "Stranger Than Fiction" (Gurewitz) – 2:20
15. "Dream of Unity" – 2:59
16. "Punk Rock Song" (German language version) – 2:27
17. "Leave Mine to Me" (live) – 2:16
18. "Change of Ideas" (live) – 0:54
19. "Slumber" (live) – 2:37
20. "Cease" (live) – 2:55

Japanese and German bonus tracks

21. "We're Only Gonna Die" (with Biohazard) (live) – 5:24
22. "The Henchman '98" (live) – 1:12
23. "The Answer" (live) – 3:19
24. "The Universal Cynic" (Ithaca session) – 2:16
25. "The Dodo" (Ithaca session) (Graffin, Baker) – 2:11

Notes

- Tracks 1–5 from The Gray Race, 1996
- Tracks 6–8 from The New America, 2000
- Tracks 9–11 from No Substance, 1998
- Tracks 12–14 from Stranger Than Fiction, 1994
- Tracks 15, 19 and 20 from ""Dream of Unity"" single, 1997
- Tracks 16, 24 and 25 from "Punk Rock Song" single, 1996; tracks 24 and 25 recorded at Polypterus Studios, Ithaca, New York, February 1995
- Tracks 17 and 18 from "A Walk" single, 1996; recorded live in Germany in 1995
- Track 21 from "The Streets of America" single, 1996; recorded live in Bremen, Germany, July 6, 1996
- Tracks 22 and 23 from "Raise Your Voice" single, 1998

== Personnel ==
Adapted from the album liner notes.

=== Bad Religion ===
- Greg Graffin – lead vocals, backing vocals
- Greg Hetson – guitar
- Brett Gurewitz – guitar, backing vocals (12–14)
- Brian Baker – guitar, backing vocals (1–11, 15–25)
- Jay Bentley – bass guitar, backing vocals
- Bobby Schayer – drums

=== Technical ===
- Bad Religion – producer (1–5, 9–16, 19, 20, 24, 25)
- Ric Ocasek – producer (1–5, 16)
- Todd Rundgren – producer (6–8)
- Alex Perialas – producer (9–11)
- Ronnie Kimball – producer (9–11)
- Andy Wallace – producer (12–14)
- Greg Graffin – producer (17, 18)
- Emek – front cover
- Thom Piston – design
