= Live at the London Palladium =

Live album by Marvin Gaye
- Released: March 15, 1977
- Recorded: October 1976 (live); December 13, 1976 – January 31, 1977 (studio)
- Venues: London Palladium, London
- Studios: Marvin's Room, Los Angeles
- Genres: Soul; funk; disco
- Length: 78:35
- Label: Tamla
- Producers: Marvin Gaye; Art Stewart

Marvin Gaye chronology
The Best of Marvin Gaye (1976)	Live at the London Palladium (1977)	Here, My Dear (1978)

Singles from Live at the London Palladium
- 1. "Got To Give It Up" Released: March 15th 1977

Live at the London Palladium is a live double album by the soul musician Marvin Gaye, released March 15, 1977, on Tamla Records. The recording sessions took place live at several concerts at the London Palladium in London, England, in October 1976, with the exception of the hit single "Got to Give It Up", which was recorded at Gaye's Los Angeles studio Marvin's Room on January 31, 1977. Live at the London Palladium features intimate performances by Gaye of many of his career highlights, including early hits for Motown and recent material from his previous three studio albums. As with his previous live album, Marvin Gaye Live!, production of the record was handled entirely by Gaye, except for the studio portion, "Got to Give It Up", which was managed by Art Stewart.

Live at the London Palladium received a surprising and significant amount of critical recognition for a live album following its initial release. Critical reviews of the album were positive compared to the mild receptiveness Gaye's previous studio album I Want You received. As Gaye's most successful live release, the album also became one of his most commercially successful albums during his tenure at Motown's Tamla label, as well as a Billboard chart hit. A digitally remastered reissue was released on August 24, 1999, by Motown on compact disc.

== Background ==
In October 1976, Marvin Gaye had begun recuperating from personal issues. He had recently gone through a divorce with his first wife, and sister of Motown-CEO Berry Gordy, Anna Gordy, and married his second wife, Janis Hunter. Hunter had previously inspired many of Gaye's romantic-themed albums including 1973's Let's Get It On and his previous album, the erotic I Want You. Gaye was also going through drug addiction to help cope with stage fright. By 1976, Gaye, while still a popular artist in America - his "I Want You" single hit the American top twenty - he was slowly starting a steep climb down as disco began to dominate popular music, but while American fans were moving on to other sounds, the British audience was still very appreciative of Gaye's fame and music, as Gaye would take advantage of this and perform a series of shows in Britain.

Live at the London Palladium was recorded during several live shows performed by Gaye in England's capital city, London. The performances won rave reviews by the British press in London, the first of which took place on October 3, 1976, and continued throughout the rest of that month.

== Music ==
Though he wasn't over his stage fright and often mumbled words on stage, when performing and singing, Gaye, then 37, still could dazzle an audience with his charm, wit and show-stopping talent as was heard on the album.

Featuring a variety of songs from newer material encompassing from Gaye's 1976 album, I Want You, to older songs (featured in three segues of medleys) from his early to mid-1960s heyday to his famed What's Going On period in 1970–1971, his legendary duets and a trio of songs from his Let's Get It On album, Gaye performed for the British audience. Highlights include the performances of "Come Get to This", "Let's Get It On" (on which Gaye moaned during a break of the song to the delight of several female fans who were heard squealing, as heard on the album) and "Distant Lover".

Live at the London Palladium's three epic medleys, which all exceeded nine minutes, featured Gaye's intimate interactions with the audience and reflections on his songs. An Allmusic reviewer later wrote of Gaye's performance, "you can feel the sultry passion in his voice as his singing drifts close to moaning and his ad libbing approaches tasteful, amorous aural lovemaking", and continued to write in a review of Live at the London Palladium that the "between-song moments" when Gaye addressed the audience revealed "just how shaken Gaye is at this troubled point in his career. Listen carefully and you can sense the struggling instability that would erupt cathartically a year later with Here, My Dear."

After the concert was over following Gaye saying "Thank you!" over and over almost in sing-song medley as the band opened and closed with the intro to "I Want You", Gaye launches into the studio effort, his one attempt at making a convincing "disco record", the funk track, "Got to Give It Up". Recorded at Gaye's Los Angeles studio, Marvin's Room, the singer vocalized a song where the author is longing to get out of his shy cover and get on the dance floor with reckless abandon. The original song runs for nearly twelve minutes, however, a single version of "Got to Give It Up" was released featuring a four-and-a-half minute A-side.

== Reception ==
Professional ratings
Review scores
Source	Rating
AllMusic	4/5 stars
Christgau's Record Guide	B−
Pitchfork Media	8.3/10
Rolling Stone	(favorable)

"Got to Give It Up", which became a No. 1 hit on the Billboard pop and R&B/Soul singles chart, as well as a No. 1 hit on the Hot Dance/Disco chart, later influenced songs composed and performed by Michael Jackson. The first of which, "Shake Your Body (Down to the Ground)", featuring the Jackson 5, had Michael singing in the same manner, style and voice pitch as Gaye had during the closing chant in "Got to Give It Up": "Let's dance/let's shout/get funky what it's all about!", while his solo No. 1 hit, "Don't Stop 'Til You Get Enough", was strongly influenced by "Got to Give It Up". Soon after, Live at the London Palladium became one of Gaye's best-selling and most commercially successful albums during his late-Motown period, reaching the top of the Soul Albums chart and peaking at No. 3 on the Pop Albums chart. Critical recognition of the album was also favorable and continued following the album's reissue on compact disc.

In late 1977, Live at the London Palladium remained in the top 10 for thirteen weeks and went on to sell two million copies becoming one of the top ten best-selling albums of that year in America. The album was Gaye's last official live release until a July 1980 show at the Montreux Jazz Festival was released as a CD in 2003 though live bootleg copies of Gaye's 1979 Japan tour and 1983 North American tour have been released in small labels over the years.

== Track listing ==
=== Original LP ===
Original 1977 US vinyl LP double album.

==== Side one ====
1. "Intro Theme" (Ross, Ware) – 2:32
2. "All the Way Round" (Ross, Ware) – 5:15
3. "Since I Had You" (Gaye, Ware) – 4:15
4. "Come Get to This" (Gaye) – 2:02
5. "Let's Get It On" (Gaye, Townsend) – 6:40

==== Side two ====
1. "Trouble Man" (Gaye) – 6:17
2. Medley I – 8:40:
  - "Ain't That Peculiar"
  - "You're a Wonderful One"
  - "Stubborn Kind of Fellow"
  - "Pride & Joy"
  - "Little Darling (I Need You)"
  - "I Heard It Through the Grapevine"
  - "Hitch Hike"
  - "You"
  - "Too Busy Thinking About My Baby"
  - "How Sweet It Is (To Be Loved by You)"
3. Medley II – 9:40:
  - "Inner City Blues (Make Me Wanna Holler)"
  - "God Is Love"
  - "What's Going On"
  - "Save the Children"

==== Side three ====
1. Medley III (Performed by Gaye & Florence Lyles) – 12:01
  - "You're All I Need to Get By"
  - "Ain't Nothing Like the Real Thing"
  - "Your Precious Love"
  - "It Takes Two"
  - "Ain't No Mountain High Enough"
2. "Distant Lover" (G. Fuqua, Gaye, Greene) – 5:20
3. "Closing Theme / I Want You" (Ross, Ware) – 3:00

==== Side four ====
1. "Got to Give It Up" (Gaye) – 11:53

=== CD reissue ===
1999 compact disc reissue.

1. "Intro Theme" – 2:34
2. "All the Way Round" – 3:50
3. "Since I Had You" – 4:59
4. "Come Get to This" – 2:24
5. "Let's Get It On" – 6:21
6. "Trouble Man" – 5:39
7. Medley I - 8:49
  - "Ain't That Peculiar"
  - "You're a Wonderful One"
  - "Stubborn Kind of Fellow"
  - "Pride & Joy"
  - "Little Darling (I Need You)"
  - "I Heard It Through the Grapevine"
  - "Hitch Hike"
  - "You"
  - "Too Busy Thinking About My Baby"
  - "How Sweet It Is (To Be Loved by You)"
8. Medley II (9:49)
  - "Inner City Blues (Make Me Wanna Holler)"
  - "God Is Love"
  - "What's Going On"
  - "Save the Children"
9. Medley III – 10:27
  - "You're All I Need to Get By"
  - "Ain't Nothing Like the Real Thing"
  - "Your Precious Love"
  - "It Takes Two"
  - "Ain't No Mountain High Enough"
10. "Thanks" – 1:05
11. "Distant Lover" – 6:31
12. "Closing Theme: I Want You" – 3:47
13. "Got to Give It Up" – 11:52

== Charts ==
=== Weekly charts ===
Chart (1977)	Peak positions
U.S. Billboard Pop Albums	3
U.S. Billboard Top Soul Albums	1

=== Year-end charts ===
Chart (1977)	Peak positions
U.S. Billboard Pop Albums	45
U.S. Billboard Top Soul Albums	5

=== Singles ===
Year	Title	US	US R&B	US Dance	AUS	CAN	NED	UK
1977	"Got to Give It Up, Pt. 1"	1	1	1	89	3	24	7

== Personnel ==
- Odell Brown - synthesizer
- Elmira Amos - percussion
- Jack Ashford - tambourine
- Frankie Beverly - spoons and milk bottle
- Gerald "Get Down" Brown - bass guitar
- Walter Cox - vocals
- Terry Evans - guitar
- Bobby Gant - vocals
- Frankie Gaye - background vocals
- Marvin Gaye - vocals, keyboards, RMI bass synthesizer, juice bottle, producer (tracks: A1 to C3)
- David Ly - saxophone
- Florence Lyles - duet vocalist
- Gwanda Hambrick - vocals
- Fernando Harkness - saxophone
- Jan Hunter - background vocals
- Hiro Ito – photography
- Johnny McGhee - guitar
- Nolan Andrew Smith - trumpet
- Michael Stanton - electric piano
- Art Stewart – producer (tracks: D1)
- Melvin Webb - conga
- Bugsy Wilcox - drums
- Richard D. Young – photography

== See also ==
- List of number-one R&B albums of 1977 (U.S.)
