= Tested =

Live album by Bad Religion
- Released: January 1997
- Recorded: April 17 – October 14, 1996
- Genre: Punk rock
- Length: 65:49
- Label: Dragnet; Epic
- Producer: Bad Religion; Ronnie Kimball

Bad Religion chronology
| The Gray Race (1996) | Tested (1997) | No Substance (1998) |

Professional ratings
Review scores
| Source | Rating |
|---|---|
| AllMusic | 3/5 stars |
| The Great Rock Discography | 5/10 |
| Punknews.org | 5/5 stars |

Tested is the first official live album by punk rock band Bad Religion. It was recorded in the USA, Canada, Germany, Estonia, Denmark, Italy and Austria, in 1996, and released in 1997. It is Bad Religion's second live album. Instead of using crowd microphones and mobile studios like most live albums, the band tapped the inputs, for a result that portrays Bad Religion's live sound without crowd noise. It also includes three new songs; "Dream of Unity," "It's Reciprocal," and the title track.

== Background ==
Bad Religion's US label, Atlantic, turned down releasing Tested; however, the band's German label, Sony, agreed to release the album in Europe and the rest of the world through its imprints Dragnet and Epic. The album was released in January 1997 in Australia, followed by a European release in February. In March, it was available as import-only in the US.

"Dream of Unity" was released as a single in Germany in 1997.

In 2008, Tested was reissued in Europe by Epitaph.

== Critical reception ==
Dave Thompson, in Alternative Rock, wrote: "Disconcerting the first listen, energizing thereafter, few live albums have been this brave."

In his review for AllMusic, Jack Rabid called the album "a bit of a letdown." He felt that the album lacks a "you are there" feel and that the overall sound is "merely average." He concluded, "Nonetheless, with a band this top-notch, even such a merely passable, perfectly clear recording demonstrates their awesome punk prowess enough (especially that of singer Graffin, whose phenomenal pipes soar all over this) to make Tested a large pleasure just the same." Rabid said of the three new studio tracks: "Dream of Unity" is uncharacteristically half-baked and slightly dull, but both "Tested" and "It's Reciprocal" burn the laser off the player."

== Track listing ==
| No. | Title | Writer(s) | Recording date and place | Length |
|---|---|---|---|---|
| 1. | "Operation Rescue" | Greg Graffin | June 26, 1996; The Arena, Berlin, Germany | 2:11 |
| 2. | "Punk Rock Song" | Graffin | July 10, 1996; Olympic Stadium, Rome, Italy | 2:24 |
| 3. | "Tomorrow" | Graffin | July 10, 1996; Olympic Stadium, Rome, Italy | 1:54 |
| 4. | "A Walk" | Graffin | June 27, 1996; Roskilde Festival, Roskilde, Denmark | 2:27 |
| 5. | "God Song" | Graffin | September 19, 1996; Metropol, Pittsburgh, Pennsylvania, United States | 1:48 |
| 6. | "Pity the Dead" | Graffin | June 22, 1996; The Amphitheater, Loreley, Germany | 2:59 |
| 7. | "1000 More Fools" | Brett Gurewitz | September 7, 1996; Holidome, Melbourne, Florida, United States | 1:39 |
| 8. | "Drunk Sincerity" | Graffin | April 24, 1996; RPM Warehouse, Toronto, Ontario, Canada | 2:17 |
| 9. | "Generator" | Gurewitz | June 30, 1996; Westfalenhallen, Dortmund, Germany | 3:23 |
| 10. | "Change of Ideas" | Graffin | April 25, 1996; State Theatre, Detroit, Michigan, United States | 0:59 |
| 11. | "Portrait of Authority" | Graffin | June 26, 1996; The Arena, Berlin, Germany | 2:52 |
| 12. | "What It Is" | Graffin | April 17, 1996; Roseland Ballroom, New York City, New York, United States | 2:20 |
| 13. | "Dream of Unity" (studio track) | Graffin | September 4, 1996; Polypterus Studio, Ithaca, New York, United States | 2:50 |
| 14. | "Sanity" | Gurewitz | September 11, 1996; Button South, Raleigh, North Carolina, United States | 2:43 |
| 15. | "American Jesus" | Gurewitz, Graffin | June 22, 1996; The Amphitheater, Loreley, Germany | 3:15 |
| 16. | "Do What You Want" | Gurewitz | September 19, 1996; Metropol, Pittsburgh, Pennsylvania, United States | 1:15 |
| 17. | "Part III" | Jay Bentley | June 19, 1996; Circus Krone, Munich, Germany | 2:54 |
| 18. | "Ten In 2010" | Graffin | July 7, 1996; Tallinna Lauluväljak, Tallinn, Estonia | 2:24 |
| 19. | "No Direction" | Graffin | September 12, 1996; Hammerjack's, Baltimore, Maryland, United States | 3:07 |
| 20. | "Along the Way" | Graffin | May 3, 1996; PNE Forum, Vancouver, British Columbia, Canada | 1:38 |
| 21. | "Recipe for Hate" | Graffin | April 28, 1996; Riviera Theatre, Chicago, Illinois, United States | 2:15 |
| 22. | "Fuck Armageddon... This Is Hell" | Graffin | May 8, 1996; Warfield Theatre, San Francisco, California, United States | 3:00 |
| 23. | "It's Reciprocal" (studio track) | Graffin, Brian Baker, Bobby Schayer | October 14, 1996; Polypterus Studio, Ithaca, New York, United States | 2:04 |
| 24. | "Struck a Nerve" | Graffin | September 8, 1996; Shades, Jacksonville, Florida, United States | 3:36 |
| 25. | "Leave Mine to Me" | Graffin | April 22, 1996; Verdun Auditorium, Montreal, Quebec, Canada | 2:13 |
| 26. | "Tested" (studio track) | Graffin | September 2, 1996; Polypterus Studio, Ithaca, New York, United States | 3:05 |
| 27. | "No Control" | Graffin | September 8, 1996; Shades, Jacksonville, Florida, United States | 2:03 |
| Total length: | | | | 65:49 |

== Personnel ==
Adapted from the album liner notes.

Bad Religion

- Greg Graffin – vocals
- Brian Baker – guitar, backing vocals
- Greg Hetson – guitar
- Jay Bentley – bass guitar, backing vocals
- Bobby Schayer – drums

Technical

- Bad Religion – production, recording, mixing, concept
- Ronnie Kimball – production, mixing
- George Marino – mastering
- Steve Raskin – art direction, design
- ION Design – art direction, design, photography
- Peter Hayes – cover stamp, flag stamp
- Jerry Mahoney – backdrop
- John Allan – photography
- Thorsten Martin-Edingshaus – photography
- Olaf Heine – photography
- Rob Myers – photography

== Notes and trivia ==
- The songs "Tested", "Dream of Unity" and "It's Reciprocal" are previously unreleased studio tracks.
- The live songs were recorded in Berlin (Germany), Rome (Italy), Roskilde (Denmark), Pittsburgh (PA, USA), Loreley (Germany), Melbourne (FL, USA), Toronto (Ontario, Canada), Dortmund (Germany), Detroit (MI, USA), Berlin (Germany), New York (NY, USA), Ithaca (NY, USA), Raleigh (NC, USA), Munich (Germany), Tallinn (Estonia), Baltimore (MD, USA), Vancouver (British Columbia, Canada), Chicago (IL, USA), San Francisco (CA, USA), Jacksonville (FL, USA) and Montreal (Quebec, Canada)
- The disc has the phrase "No Bad Religion song can make your live complete" printed on it – a slightly modified quote from the song No Direction, in which the lyric is “life” instead of “live”.

== Charts ==
Chart performance for Tested
| Chart (1997) | Peak position |
|---|---|
| Australian Albums (ARIA) | 67 |
| Austrian Albums (Ö3 Austria) | 49 |
| Finnish Albums (Suomen virallinen lista) | 25 |
| German Albums (Offizielle Top 100) | 74 |
