= No Substance =

Studio album by Bad Religion
- Released: May 5, 1998
- Recorded: June 1997 – February 1998
- Studios: Pyramid (Ithaca, New York); Polypterus (Ithaca, New York)
- Genre: Punk rock
- Length: 41:53
- Label: Atlantic
- Producers: Bad Religion, Alex Perialas, Ronnie Kimball

Bad Religion chronology
Tested (1997)	No Substance (1998)	The New America (2000)

Singles from No Substance
- 1. "Raise Your Voice" Released: 1998

No Substance is the tenth full-length album by the punk rock band Bad Religion. It was the band's third (or fourth, if the reissue of Recipe for Hate is counted) release on Atlantic Records, and their second studio album since guitarist Brett Gurewitz's departure.

No Substance was anticipated by both music critics and fans as a result of the band's previous worldwide successes with their 1994 major label debut Stranger Than Fiction and its 1996 follow up The Gray Race. The album has been met with mixed reviews and was not as successful as band's past releases. The album was re-released by Epitaph Records on September 15, 2008. No songs of the album would turn into live staples; "Raise Your Voice" is occasionally played live in Germany due to Die Toten Hosen singer Campino's guest vocals.

== Reception ==
Professional ratings
Review scores
Source	Rating
AllMusic	2.5/5 stars
Alternative Rock	8/10
Robert Christgau	(dud)
CMJ New Music Monthly	(positive)
The Indianapolis Star	3/5 stars
NME	3/10 stars
Rolling Stone	3/5 stars
San Antonio Express-News	(positive)
Spin	4/10 stars
Wall of Sound	70/100

Author Dave Thompson, in his book Alternative Rock (2000), wrote that the shared songwriting credits make this the band's "most eclectic album ever, eagerly exploring new sounds and styles... ah, Into the Unknown II! Only better."

== Track listing ==
All tracks are written by Greg Graffin, except where noted.

No.	Title	Writer(s)	Length
1.	"Hear It"		1:49
2.	"Shades of Truth"		4:01
3.	"All Fantastic Images"	Graffin, Brian Baker	2:08
4.	"The Biggest Killer in American History"		2:14
5.	"No Substance"		3:04
6.	"Raise Your Voice!" (featuring Campino)		2:55
7.	"Sowing the Seeds of Utopia"		2:01
8.	"The Hippy Killers"		3:01
9.	"The State of the End of the Millennium Address"	Graffin, Baker	2:22
10.	"The Voracious March of Godliness"		2:27
11.	"Mediocre Minds"	Graffin, Greg Hetson	1:56
12.	"Victims of the Revolution"	Graffin, Baker	3:17
13.	"Strange Denial"		3:02
14.	"At the Mercy of Imbeciles"	Graffin, Baker, Hetson	1:34
15.	"The Same Person"	Graffin, Baker, Jay Bentley	2:49
16.	"In So Many Ways"		3:04

Japanese bonus track
No.	Title	Length
17.	"Dream of Unity"	2:50

US limited edition bonus promo disc
No.	Title	Writer(s)	Length
1.	"The Universal Cynic" (B-side, 1996)		2:18
2.	"Markovian Process" (B-side, 1994)		1:30
3.	"News from the Front" (B-side, 1994)	Brett Gurewitz, Bentley, Bobby Schayer	2:23
4.	"Leaders and Followers" (B-side, 1994)		2:42
5.	"Dream of Unity" (from Tested, 1997)		2:52
6.	"Tested" (from Tested, 1997)		3:04
7.	"The Answer" (live) (B-side, 1998)		3:11
8.	"The Dodo" (B-side, 1996)	Graffin, Baker	2:10
9.	"Follow the Leader" (previously unreleased)	Graffin, Bentley, Baker, Schayer	4:28

== Personnel ==
Adapted from the album liner notes.

Bad Religion

- Greg Graffin – lead vocals, backing vocals
- Greg Hetson – guitar
- Brian Baker – guitar, backing vocals
- Jay Bentley – bass guitar, backing vocals
- Bobby Schayer – drums

Additional musicians

- Campino from Die Toten Hosen – guest vocals on "Raise Your Voice!"

Technical

- Bad Religion – producer, engineer
- Alex Perialas – producer, engineer
- Ronnie Kimball – producer, engineer
- Jason Arnold – additional engineer
- Mike Dy – additional engineer
- Fred Kevorkian – additional engineer
- Chris Lord-Alge – mixing
- Gavin Lurssen – mastering
- Danielle Gibson – art coordination
- Steve Raskin – art direction, design
- Valerie Wagner – art direction, design
- Terry Richardson – photography
- Chris Toliver – photography

== Charts ==
Chart (1998)	Peak position
Austrian Albums (Ö3 Austria)	18
Canada Top Albums/CDs (RPM)	68
Finnish Albums (Suomen virallinen lista)	17
German Albums (Offizielle Top 100)	28
Swedish Albums (Sverigetopplistan)	54
UK Rock & Metal Albums (Official Charts)	23
US Billboard 200	78

== Notes ==
- "The State of The End of The Millennium Address" is written like a speech, very similar to the beginning of "Voice of God is Government" from How Could Hell Be Any Worse?.
- If you dial the 800 number, it will link through to ConAgra Foods customer service (No longer in service - April 16, 2017).
- On the European release, Campino sings alternating lines on "Raise Your Voice". On the US version, he only provides backing vocals. All album releases on music streaming platforms feature the European version.
- The cover art model has been widely reported as being actress Kristen Johnston, but she refuted this claim in 2019 via a Twitter post.
