= Marvin Is 60: A Tribute Album =

Compilation album by Various artists
- Released: June 22, 1999
- Genre: R&B
- Length: 54:28
- Label: Motown Records
- Producer: Various producers

Professional ratings
Review scores
Source	Rating
Allmusic	2.5/5 stars

Marvin Is 60: A Tribute Album is the second tribute album (after Inner City Blues: The Music of Marvin Gaye) dedicated to Motown recording artist Marvin Gaye, released by Motown in 1999. The album featured covers of Gaye's hits including "Sexual Healing", "Your Precious Love" and "Distant Lover". Artists such as Erykah Badu, D'Angelo, El DeBarge, Chico DeBarge, Joe, Brian McKnight and Gerald Levert took part in paying tribute to Gaye. The album peaked at number 97 on the Billboard Top 200 and number 20 on the Billboard R&B chart and released the cover versions of "Your Precious Love" (Erykah Badu & D'Angelo) and "You Sure Love to Ball" (Will Downing) as singles. The album was released 15 years after Gaye was killed.

== Track listing ==
1. "Your Precious Love" - Erykah Badu & D'Angelo (4:38)
2. "Distant Lover" - Brian McKnight (4:23)
3. "You Sure Love to Ball" - Will Downing (3:39)
4. "Mercy Mercy Me (The Ecology)" - Jon B. (3:07)
5. "What's Going On - Profyle (3:59)
6. "Got to Give It Up" - Zhane (5:01)
7. "I Want You" - Montell Jordan (4:23)
8. "Let's Get It On" - Gerald Levert (4:26)
9. "Sexual Healing" - El DeBarge (4:57)
10. "Soon I'll Be Loving You Again" - Joe (3:02)
11. "'Til Tomorrow" - Chico DeBarge (3:56)
12. "Just to Keep Her Satisfied" - Kenny Lattimore (4:16)
13. "If This World Were Mine" - Tony Rich & Grenique (4:40)
