= Joy Is Coming =

Studio album by Guy King
- Released: May 28, 2021
- Recorded: Los Angeles, Ca
- Genre: Soul, gospel, blues, jazz
- Producer: Guy King; Josh Smith

Guy King chronology
Truth (2021)	Joy Is Coming (2021)

Joy Is Coming is the fifth studio album by Israeli blues and jazz guitarist Guy King. the album was released in 2021 and featured songwriting by David Ritz. Guitarist Josh Smith shared producing credits with Guy King.

== Background ==
The album has been called autobiographical. Guy King co wrote seven of the tracks with songwriter David Ritz (writer of the Marvin Gaye song Sexual Healing) Ritz encouraged King to write the songs about personal experiences. The first single which was releases is titled "Devil's Toy" and features blues guitarist Joe Bonamassa. The album includes 10 original songs.

The album was written before the COVID-19 pandemic. It was recorded in Los Angeles at the recording studio of blues guitarist Josh Smith. The city of Los Angeles enacted a shut down as a result of the pandemic so the mix was finished and King returned to Chicago. King waited and released the album after the pandemic.

== Release and reception ==
The album was released on May 28, 2021. Mike O’Cull from Rock and Blues Muse reviewed the album in May 2021 and he said this about the album: "...high-level musicianship that also has massive crossover potential." He went on to say, "Every moment of Joy Is Coming is vital and entertaining". Brant Buckley from American Blues Scene stated, "Joy is Coming is a soulful and inspiring compilation of songs, straight from the heart". Dan Forte of Vintage Guitar said the album was "...cool soul grooves peppered with tasty blues guitar."

== Personnel ==
- Josh Smith and Guy King - Producers
- Guy King and David Ritz - Songwriting
- Guy King - Vocals
- Guy King Lead guitar, Rhythm guitar
- Joe Bonamassa - guitar (Devil's Toy)
- Tom Vaitsas: piano, organ, keyboards
- Joshua Ramos: bass
- Samuel Jewell: drums, percussion
- Marques Carroll: trumpet, flugelhorn
- Anthony Bruno: tenor saxophone, baritone saxophone
- Vanessa Bell Armstrong: vocals ("Up, Up, Up")

== Tracks ==
1. "Joy is Coming"
2. "Devil's Toy" (featuring Joe Bonamassa)
3. "Choices"
4. "Sanity"
5. "Hole in My Soul"
6. "Oh, Sarah"
7. "Don't Do It (If You Don't Want To Do It)"
8. "Up, Up, Up" (featuring Vanessa Bell Armstrong)
9. "A Prayer for Me"
10. "Looking for You"
