= Leo's Sunshipp =

American girl group and vocal music trio

- Genres: Soul, R&B
- Labels: Lyons Records
- Past members: Kenneth Stover; Johnny Simone; Alvin Few

Leo's Sunshipp was a short-lived American soul and R&B group established in 1977. Best known for their only release, We Need Each Other (1978), the group is remembered for its smooth, jazzy sound and the posthumous recognition of tracks such as I'm Back for More and Give Me the Sunshine.

== History ==
=== Background ===
The group was formed by Kenny Stover, Johnny Simone, and Alvin Few, all of whom were born under the zodiac sign Leo, giving rise to the name Leo's Sunshipp.

Stover grew up in the Hough neighborhood of Cleveland, Ohio, before moving to Detroit with his brother, songwriter Elgie Stover. Both worked for their cousin Harvey Fuqua before relocating to Los Angeles, where Kenny became a staff songwriter for Motown. Elgie collaborated with Marvin Gaye and co-wrote "The Bells" for The Originals.

In Los Angeles, Stover met Johnny Simone, a vocalist from Atlanta, Georgia. Simone had previously been a member of the Wallace Brothers and later the Naturals. After those groups disbanded, he moved to Los Angeles, where he became a backing singer for Marvin Gaye. Together, Stover and Simone toured as Gaye's backing vocalists and appeared on his 1978 album Here, My Dear. Simone also briefly toured with Stevie Wonder before co-founding Leo's Sunshipp.

The third member, Alvin Few, is less documented, but he joined Stover and Simone in establishing the group in 1977.

=== We Need Each Other ===
The trio began recording material for a debut album in 1977. They managed to complete four tracks before Simone fell ill during the production and died of cancer in his early thirties, bringing the project to a halt. Following his death, Stover blocked the album's release and later joined the group Finished Touch in 1978.

Although unfinished, the recordings were eventually compiled by Lyons Records and released as We Need Each Other in 1978. The album contains four completed songs along with four instrumental mixes. Despite its limited scope, the album has become regarded as an underground classic of 1970s soul. The track "I'm Back for More" was later covered by Marlena Shaw, Al Johnson, and Tavares.

== Legacy ==
Although Leo's Sunshipp recorded only a handful of tracks, the group's work has enjoyed lasting recognition among soul collectors and R&B enthusiasts. The combination of its unfinished nature and Simone's untimely death has contributed to the album's cult status.
