= Live at the Palladium =

Live at the Palladium may refer to:

- Live at the Palladium (Elkie Brooks album), 2000 Elkie Brooks album
- Live at the Palladium (The Carpenters album), released in 1976 by The Carpenters
- Live at the Palladium, 2004 Disco Biscuits DVD
- Live at the Palladium (Turin Brakes album), 2005 Turin Brakes album
- Live at the Palladium (Bad Religion DVD), 2006 Bad Religion DVD
- Live at the Palladium, 2004 The Divine Comedy DVD

== See also ==
- Live at the London Palladium, 1977 Marvin Gaye album
- Live at the Hollywood Palladium, December 15, 1988, 1991 Keith Richards album
