= Let's Get It On =

Album by Marvin Gaye

Studio album by Marvin Gaye
- Released: August 28, 1973
- Recorded: June 1, 1970 – April 11, 1972; February 1 – July 26, 1973
- Studios: Hitsville U.S.A. and Golden World, Detroit; Hitsville West, Los Angeles
- Genres: Soul; R&B; funk
- Length: 31:36
- Label: Tamla
- Producers: Marvin Gaye; Ed Townsend

Marvin Gaye chronology
Trouble Man (1972)	Let's Get It On (1973)	Diana & Marvin (1973)

Singles from Let's Get It On
- 1. "Let's Get It On" Released: June 15, 1973; 2. "Come Get to This" Released: October 11, 1973; 3. "You Sure Love to Ball" Released: January 2, 1974

Let's Get It On is the twelfth studio album by the American soul singer and songwriter Marvin Gaye. It was released on August 28, 1973, by the Motown subsidiary label Tamla Records on LP.

Recording sessions for the album took place during June 1970 to July 1973 at Hitsville U.S.A. and Golden World Studio in Detroit, and at Hitsville West in Los Angeles. Serving as Gaye's first venture into the funk genre, Let's Get It On also incorporates smooth soul and doo-wop styles alongside sexually suggestive lyrics, leading to one writer's description of it as "one of the most sexually charged albums ever recorded". Gaye infused ideas of spiritual healing in songs about sex and romance, in part as a way of coping with childhood abuses from his father Marvin Gay Sr., which had stunted his sexuality.

Following the breakthrough success of his socially conscious album What's Going On (1971), Let's Get It On helped establish Gaye as a sex icon and broadened his mainstream appeal. It produced three singles—the title track, "Come Get to This", and "You Sure Love to Ball"—that achieved Billboard chart success. Let's Get It On became the most commercially successful album of Gaye's career at Motown, resulting in more creative control being given to him by the label. Its erotic balladry, multi-tracking of Gaye's vocals, and seductive funk sound also influenced later R&B recording artists and producers, with the title track specifically helping pioneer the slow jam and quiet storm formats.

In retrospect, Let's Get It On has been regarded by writers and music critics as a landmark recording in soul. It increased the popularity of funk during the 1970s, while Gaye's smooth-soul sound marked a change from his record label's previous success with the "Motown Sound" formula. Among the most acclaimed LPs in history, it frequently appears on professional rankings of the greatest albums and has been inducted into the Grammy Hall of Fame as a historically important recording. In 2001, it was reissued by Motown as a two-CD deluxe edition release. In 2023, the album was reissued on digital platforms only with added material for its 50th anniversary.

== Background ==
In the spring of 1972, Marvin Gaye was suffering from writer's block. Following the release of his most commercially successful album up to that point, What's Going On (1971), and the soundtrack album to the blaxploitation film Trouble Man (1972), Gaye had struggled to come up with new material after Motown Records had renegotiated a new contract with him. The contract provided him with more creative control over his recordings. The deal was worth $1 million, making him the highest-earning soul artist, as well as the highest-earning black artist, at the time. He was also struggling with deciding whether or not to relocate to Los Angeles, following Motown-CEO Berry Gordy's move of the record label and replacement of the Detroit-based Hitsville U.S.A. (Motown Studio A) recording studio with the Hitsville West studio in Los Angeles. Amid relocation and his lack of material, Gaye was struggling with his conscience, as well as dealing with expectations from his wife, Gordy's sister Anna. Gaye's separation from Gordy pressured him emotionally. During this time, he had also been attempting to cope with past issues that had stemmed from his childhood.

His view of sex was unsettled, tormented, riddled with pain.

— David Ritz, Gaye's biographer

During his childhood, Gaye had been physically abused by his preacher father Marvin Gay Sr., who disciplined his son under extremely moralistic and fundamentalist Christian teachings. As a result, the meaning and practice of sex had later become a disturbing question for Gaye. As an adult, he suffered from impotence and became plagued by sadomasochistic fantasies, which haunted him in his dreams and provoked intense feelings of guilt. Gaye learned to cope with his personal issues with a newly found spirituality. He began incorporating his new outlook into his music, as initially expressed through the socially conscious album What's Going On, along with promotional photos of him wearing a kufi in honor of African traditional religions and his faith.

By winning over record executives with the success of What's Going On, Gaye attained more creative control, which he would use, following his brief separation from wife Anna Gordy, to record an album that was meant to explore themes beyond sex. As with What's Going On, Gaye wanted to have a deeper meaning than the general theme that was used to portray it; in the case of the former album, politics, and with its follow-up effort, love and romance, which would be used by Gaye as a metaphor for God's love. In his book Divided Soul: The Life of Marvin Gaye, Gaye biographer David Ritz wrote of the singer's inspiration behind Let's Get It On:

If the most profound soul songs are prayers in secular dress, Marvin's prayer is to reconcile the ecstasy of his early religious epiphany with a sexual epiphany. The hope for such a reconciliation, the search for sexual healing, is what drives his art ... The paradox is this: The sexiest of Marvin Gaye's work is also his most spiritual. That's the paradox of Marvin himself. In his struggle to wed body and soul, in his exploration of sexual passion, he expresses the most human of hungers—the hunger for God. In those songs of loss and lament—the sense of separation is heartbreaking. On one level, the separation is between man and woman. On a deeper level, the separation is between man and God.

In the album's liner notes, Gaye explained his views on the themes of sex and love, stating "I can't see anything wrong with sex between consenting anybodies. I think we make far too much of it. After all, one's genitals are just one important part of the magnificent human body ... I contend that SEX IS SEX and LOVE IS LOVE. When combined, they work well together, if two people are of about the same mind. But they are really two discrete needs and should be treated as such. Time and space will not permit me to expound further, especially in the area of the psyche. I don't believe in overly moralistic philosophies. Have your sex, it can be exciting, if you're lucky. I hope the music that I present here makes you lucky."

== Recording ==
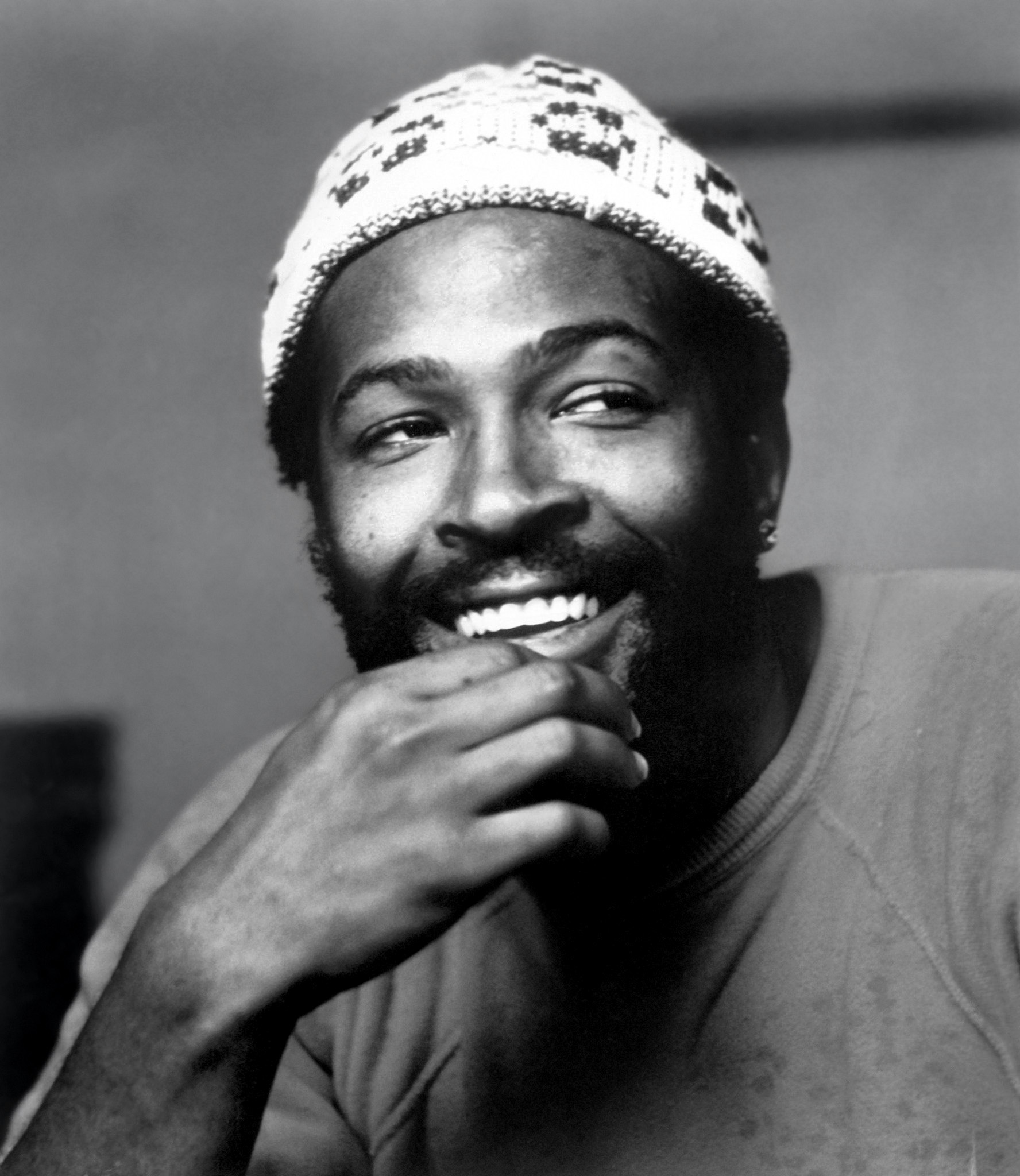
Gaye during the album's recording at Hitsville West in Los Angeles, 1973

Gaye proceeded to record some more politically conscious material at the Golden World Records studio, known as Motown's Studio B, as well as the preliminary vocals and instrumentation for some of the material to be featured on Let's Get It On. Following the earlier sessions in Detroit at Golden World, Gaye recorded at Hitsville West in Los Angeles from February to July 1973. Accompanied by an experienced group of session musicians called The Funk Brothers, who had contributed to Gaye's What's Going On, and received their first official credit, Gaye recorded the unreleased songs "The World is Rated X" and "Where Are We Going?" and the single "You're the Man" (1972) at Golden World. "Where Are We Going?" was later covered by trumpeter Donald Byrd. Gaye had planned the release of an album titled You're the Man, but it was later shelved for unknown reasons. The songs that were to be included on it, along with other unreleased recordings from Hitsville West and Golden World, were later featured on the 2001 re-release of Let's Get It On.

The album's first recording, "Let's Get It On", was composed by Gaye with friend and former Motown label mate Ed Townsend. It was originally written by Gaye as a religious ode to life, but Motown singer-songwriter Kenneth Stover re-wrote it as a more political first draft. Upon hearing Gaye's preliminary mix of Stover's draft, Townsend protested and claimed that the song would be better suited with sexual and romantic overtones, particularly "about making sweet love." Gaye and Townsend rewrote the song's lyrics together with the original arrangements and musical accompaniment of the demo intact. The lyrics were inspired by Janis Hunter, whom Gaye had become infatuated with after meeting each other through Ed Townsend during the initial sessions. Townsend has cited Hunter's presence during the album's recording as an inspiration for Gaye. Gaye's intimate relationship with Hunter subsequently became the basis for his 1976 album I Want You. While recording the title track, he was inspired to revive unfinished recordings from his 1970 sessions at the Hitsville U.S.A. Studio.

Townsend assisted Gaye with producing the rest of the album, whose recording took place at several sessions throughout 1970 to 1973. They worked on four songs together, including the ballad "If I Should Die Tonight", while Gaye composed most of the other songs, including those from past sessions. "Just to Keep You Satisfied" was originally recorded by several Motown groups, including The Originals and The Monitors, as a song dedicated to long-standing love. With re-recording the song, he had re-written the arrangement and lyrics to address the demise of his volatile marriage to Anna Gordy Gaye, who happened to be the original song's co-writer. The background vocals for the album were sung by Gaye, with the exception of "Just to Keep You Satisfied", which were done by The Originals. Most of the instrumentation for the album was done by members of The Funk Brothers, including bassist James Jamerson, guitarists Robert White and Eddie Willis, and percussionist Eddie "Bongo" Brown. Gaye also contributed on piano during the sessions.

== Music and lyrics ==
"Come Get to This"
"Come Get to This", the doo-wop influenced single

"You Sure Love to Ball"
"You Sure Love to Ball", the album's most sexually overt song

"Let's Get It On" features soulful, passionate lead vocals and multi-tracked background singing, both by Gaye. It has a 1950s-styled melody and begins with three wah-wah guitar notes and centers on simple chord changes, while its arrangements are centered on an eccentric rhythm pattern. Its signature guitar line is played by session musician Don Peake. Music journalist Jon Landau dubs the song "a classic Motown single, endlessly repeatable and always enjoyable". The song is reprised on the fourth track, "Keep Gettin' It On". It expands on the title track's sensual theme with political overtones: "won't you rather make love, children / as opposed to war, like you know you should."

The third track, the ballad "If I Should Die Tonight" originally appeared on the vinyl LP in a shortened version lasting only 3:03. For the 1986 'twofer' (with "What's Going On") CD reissue of the album, Motown recording engineers for the first time restored the missing verse which had been omitted from the LP. The full length track, which has been used for all subsequent releases, runs to 4 full minutes.

"Distant Lover" has Gaye crooning over serene instrumentation, leading to soulful screams near the end; from a heartbroken croon to an impassioned wail. The song's lyrics chronicled the yearning its narrator feels for a lover who is "so many miles away", as he pleads for her return and laments the emptiness he feels without her. Music writer Donarld A. Guarisco later wrote of the song's sound, in that "Marvin Gaye's studio recording enhances the dreamy style of the song with stately horn and strings, tumbling drum fills that gently nudge the song along, and mellow, doo wop-styled background vocals that echo "love her, you love her" under his romantic pleas. The song later became a concert favorite for Gaye and a live concert version, featuring female fans screaming in the background, was released as a single from his Marvin Gaye Live! album in 1974.

"You Sure Love to Ball" is one of Gaye's most sexually overt and controversial singles, with its intro and outro featuring moaning sounds made by a man and woman engaged in sex. The sexually-explicit and risqué nature of the album's content were, at the time, controversial, and the recording of such an album was deemed as a commercial risk by Motown A&R's (Artists and Repertoire) and label executives.

== Marketing and sales ==
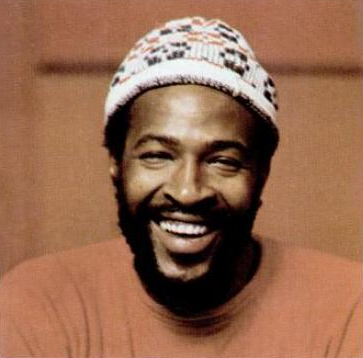
Gaye in a trade ad, c. 1973

Released on August 28, 1973, Let's Get It On surpassed Gaye's previous studio effort, What's Going On, as the best-selling record of his tenure with Motown. The album peaked at number two on the US Billboard Top LPs chart, behind The Rolling Stones's Goats Head Soup (1973), while it also managed to reach number one in Cash Box for one week, as well as two weeks at the top of Record World's music charts. Let's Get It On charted for 61 weeks on the Billboard charts, and remained at the top of the Billboard Soul Albums for 11 weeks, becoming the best-selling soul album of 1973.

Two of the album's singles reached the top 40 of the Billboard Hot 100, including "Let's Get It On", which became Gaye's second number-one US single, and the top-30 hit "Come Get to This", which peaked at number 23 on the chart. The album's third single, "You Sure Love to Ball", charted at number 50 on the Hot 100 and at number 13 on the Soul Singles chart.

Along with the album's music and sexual content, Let's Get It On's commercial success and promotion helped establish Marvin Gaye as a sex icon, while helping further expand his artistic control during his tenure at Motown. This commercial success also led to a much publicized tour for Gaye to promote Let's Get It On and expand on his repertoire as a live performer. Successful concert performances of the album's material helped Gaye gain an increasing popularity and fan base in the pop market, while earning him a reputation as one of the top live performers of the time. His performance at the Oakland Coliseum during the 1973–1974 tour was released on the 1974 LP Live!, which would serve as Gaye's only release during his sabbatical period in the mid-1970s.

== Critical reception ==
Retrospective professional reviews
Review scores
Source	Rating
AllMusic	5/5 stars
Chicago Tribune	4/4 stars
Christgau's Record Guide	A−
The Encyclopedia of Popular Music	5/5 stars
The Great Rock Discography	9/10
Music Story	5/5 stars
MusicHound R&B	4/5 stars
The New Rolling Stone Album Guide	5/5 stars
Q	5/5 stars

Let's Get It On received positive reviews from music critics. Billboard called it "fine in terms of vocal attack and material [...] touches on the excellent in terms of instrumental support", while citing the title track and "Distant Lover" as the album's best recordings. Jon Landau of Rolling Stone found Gaye's performance on-par with that of What's Going On and wrote that "he continues to transmit that same degree of intensity, sending out near cosmic overtones while eloquently phrasing the sometimes simplistic lyrics". Although he viewed that it "lacks that album's series of highpoints", Landau commented that "it ebbs and flows, occasionally threatening to spend itself on an insufficiency of ideas, but always retrieved, just in time, by Gaye's performance. From first note to last, he keeps pushing and shoving, and if he sometimes takes one step back for every two ahead, he gets there just the same — and with style and spirit to spare". In Creem magazine, Robert Christgau called the record "post-Al Green What's Going On, which means it's about fucking rather than the human condition, thank the wholly holey".

Since its initial reception, Let's Get It On has been viewed by writers as a milestone in soul music. In The Best Rock 'n' Roll Records of All Time, Jimmy Guterman writes that the album was "a bit more conventional musically (soul crossing into mild funk) and much more focused lyrically than its predecessor, What's Going On". Chicago Tribune writer Greg Kot commended Gaye for using "the multi-tracked vocals perfected on 'What's Going On', this time to convey his most intimate desires", commenting that "while the album is replete with erotic imagery, both implied and explicit, it is also as much preoccupied with distance and unfulfilled need". Jason Ankeny of AllMusic called it "a record unparalleled in its sheer sensuality and carnal energy", writing that "Gaye's passions reach their boiling point [...] With each performance laced with innuendo, each lyric a come-on, and each rhythm throbbing with lust, perhaps no other record has ever achieved the kind of sheer erotic force of Let's Get It On". Ankeny also dubbed it "one of the most sexually charged albums ever recorded." Allmusic's Lindsay Planer cites it as a "hedonistic R&B masterpiece." BBC Music's Daryl Easlea found Gaye "in supreme command of his material", and viewed it as "much more than an album about simple lust", but an "iconic, rapturous work".

=== Accolades ===
Much like What's Going On, Let's Get It On has been included in professional lists of the best albums. It was ranked number 58 on The Times's 1993 publication of the 100 Best Albums of All Time. Blender magazine ranked the album number 15 on its list of the 100 Greatest American Albums of All Time. In 2003, it was ranked number 165 on Rolling Stone's 500 Greatest Albums of All Time publication; the 2023 edition of the list ranked it 422nd. Also in 2003, Let's Get It On was reissued by Universal Music; the re-release was later given a silver certification by the British Phonographic Industry. In 2004, Let's Get It On was inducted into the Grammy Hall of Fame and cited by The Recording Academy as a recording of "historical significance".

Publication	Country	Accolade	Year	Rank
Bill Shapiro	United States	The Top 100 Rock Compact Discs	1991	*
Blender	United States	The 100 Greatest American Albums of All time	2002	15
Dave Marsh & Kevin Stein	United States	Top 40 Chartmakers - 1973	1981	6
Elvis Costello (Vanity Fair)	United States	500 Must-Have Albums You Need	2013	*
Jimmy Guterman	United States	The 100 Best Rock and Roll Records of All Time	1992	27
Kitsap Sun	United States	Top 200 Albums of the Last 40 Years	2005	67
Paul Gambaccini	United States	The World Critics Best Albums of All Time	1987	84
The Recording Academy	United States	Grammy Hall of Fame Albums and Songs	2004	*
Robert Dimery	United States	1001 Albums You Must Hear Before You Die	2005	*
Rolling Stone (Steve Pond)	United States	Steve Pond's 50 (+27) Essential Albums of the 70s	1990	39
Rolling Stone	United States	500 Greatest Albums of All Time	2003	165
Rolling Stone	United States	500 Greatest Albums of All Time	2023	422
Vibe	United States	51 Albums representing a Generation, a Sound and a Movement	2004	*
Hot Press	Ireland	The 100 Best Albums of All Time	1989	32
Mojo	United Kingdom	Mojo 1000, the Ultimate CD Buyers Guide	2001	*
NME	United Kingdom	All Times Top 100 Albums	1985	46
NME	United Kingdom	All Times Top 100 Albums + Top 50 by Decade	1993	145
The New Nation	United Kingdom	Top 100 Albums by Black Artists	2005	27
Sounds	United Kingdom	The 100 Best Albums of All Time	1986	24
The Times	United Kingdom	The 100 Best Albums of All Time	1993	58
Time Out	United Kingdom	The 100 Best Albums of All Time	1989	3
The Wire	United Kingdom	The 100 Most Important Records Ever Made	1992	*
Adresseavisen	Norway	The 100 (+23) Best Albums of All Time	1995	101
Pop	Sweden	The World's 100 Best Albums + 300 Complements	1994	101
OOR	Netherlands	Albums of the Year	1973	41
VPRO	Netherlands	299 Nominations of the Best Album of All Time	2006	*
Spex	Germany	The 100 Albums of the Century	1999	93
Rock de Lux	Spain	The 100 Best Albums of the 1970s	1988	39
Rock de Lux	Spain	The 200 Best Albums of All Time	2002	53
(*) designates lists that are unordered.

== Legacy and influence ==
Because of the album and its singles' initial sales and response, Let's Get It On marked a change and transition in sound and production for Motown, which had previously enjoyed success with its trademark "Motown Sound". The label's well-known sound, however, was beginning to fade in popularity among the majority of R&B and soul listeners, while experiencing commercial pressure from contemporary styles that incorporated more diverse elements, such as Philly soul and funk. The Motown sound was typified by characteristics such as the use of tambourines to accent the back beat, prominent and often melodic electric bass guitar lines, distinctive melodic and chord structures, and a call and response singing style that originated in gospel music. In addition, pop production techniques were simpler than that of Gaye's 1970s concept albums. Complex arrangements and elaborate, melismatic vocal riffs were avoided by Motown musicians. Following his breakthrough with What's Going On, an "experiment in collating a pseudo-classical suite of free-flowing songs", Gaye used his artistic control to modify the sound and incorporate funky instrumentation, melismatic vocalization, and heavy vocal multi-tracking, in much contrast to the established production style at the label. In contrast to Motown's previously successful process of emphasizing an artist's single releases rather than their album, Gaye and fellow producer Ed Townsend followed a similar formula previously used on What's Going On, in which the album's songs flow together in a suite-form arrangement, opposing label CEO Berry Gordy's strong emphasis on hit single success.

Gaye's change of musical style and production with the album made an immediate impact on the subsequently successful Motown artists, including Lionel Richie and Rick James. The album's vocal multi-tracking and instrumentation also influenced the development of contemporary R&B and slow jams. Allmusic calls the album "the blueprint for all of the slow jams to follow decades later — much copied, but never imitated." Renown engineer Russell Elevado's work in the neo soul genre, including his production for D'Angelo's Voodoo (2000) and Erykah Badu's Mama's Gun (2000), has been influenced by Gaye's and Townsend's production techniques and sound.

The album's sexual content pushed creative barriers in the recording industry and led to an increased popularity of sexual themes in contemporary music. Music writer Rob Bowman later cited Let's Get It On as "one of the most erotic recordings known to mankind." The album's success helped spark a series of similarly styled releases by such smooth soul artists as Barry White (Can't Get Enough), Smokey Robinson (A Quiet Storm) and Earth, Wind & Fire (That's the Way of the World). The commercial success of such artists led to a change of trend from socially conscious aesthetics to more mainstream, sensually themed music. Gaye achieved further success with I Want You (1976), featuring more sexually explicit lyrics and expanded use of vocal multi-tracking, and with Here, My Dear (1978), which he based entirely on his tumultuous marriage to Anna Gordy. In an interview with music author Michael Eric Dyson, hip hop artist Q-Tip discussed the album's influence and significance to its time period, stating:

Although there was a 'conscious' revolution, there was also a great sexual revolution ... I think Let's Get It On was Marvin wanting to make commentary on what was happening. I think there was a big 'love-in' that was going on. And with him quoting T.S. Elliot [in his liner notes, that life amounts to "Birth, copulation and death"], and the young lady moaning [on the album], we hadn't heard that before. That was another first, as well as him capturing erotica like that, and weaving it into the music the way he did; it was mind blowing. I think it was a natural progression, because we were having a revolution with our minds, and then with our bodies at that time.

Following the success of Sly and the Family Stone's There's a Riot Goin' On (1971) and James Brown's late 1960s and early 1970s singles, Gaye's Let's Get It On gave greater mainstream exposure to funk and broadened its influence on the music industry. Many later R&B musicians, such as Prince, D'Angelo, and R. Kelly, were greatly influenced by its vintage sound and seductive themes, incorporating much of Gaye's musical style into their music.

== Track listing ==
=== Original release ===
Side one
No.	Title	Writer(s)	Length
1.	"Let's Get It On"	Marvin Gaye, Ed Townsend	4:44
2.	"Please Don’t Stay (Once You Go Away)"	Gaye, Townsend	3:32
3.	"If I Should Die Tonight" (original LP edit)	Gaye, Townsend	3:03
4.	"Keep Gettin' It On"	Gaye, Townsend	3:12

Side two
No.	Title	Writer(s)	Length
1.	"Come Get to This"	Gaye	2:40
2.	"Distant Lover"	Gaye, Gwen Gordy, Sandra Greene	4:15
3.	"You Sure Love to Ball"	Gaye	4:43
4.	"Just to Keep You Satisfied"	Gaye, Anna Gordy Gaye, Elgie Stover	4:35

2002 remaster bonus tracks
No.	Title	Length
9.	"Let's Get It On (Single Edit)"	4:04
10.	"You Sure Love to Ball (Single Mix)"	3:35

=== 2001 Deluxe Edition ===
On September 18, 2001, Let's Get It On was reissued by Motown as a two-disc deluxe edition release, featuring 24-bit digital remastering of the original album's recordings, previously unissued material and a 24-page booklet which contains the original LP liner notes by Marvin Gaye, as well as essays from Gaye biographers David Ritz and Ben Edmonds.

Original album & sessions (Disc one)
No.	Title	Writer(s)	Length
1.	"Let's Get It On"	Gaye, Townsend	4:51
2.	"Please Don't Stay (Once You Go Away)"	Gaye, Townsend	3:27
3.	"If I Should Die Tonight" (unedited version)	Gaye, Townsend	4:01
4.	"Keep Getting' It On"	Gaye, Townsend	3:13
5.	"Come Get to This"	Gaye	2:41
6.	"Distant Lover"	Gaye, G. Gordy, Greene	4:17
7.	"You Sure Love to Ball"	Gaye	4:46
8.	"Just to Keep You Satisfied"	Gaye, Gordy-Gaye, Stover	4:27
9.	"Song #3" (instrumental)	Van dePitte, Gaye	5:28
10.	"My Love Is Growing"	Gaye	4:20
11.	"Cakes"	Van dePitte, Gaye	3:14
12.	"Symphony" (undubbed version)	Gaye, Robinson	2:51
13.	"I'd Give My Life for You" (alternate mix)	Gaye	3:29
14.	"I Love You Secretly" (The Miracles version)	Gaye, Gordy-Gaye, E. Stover	4:18
15.	"You're the Man" (alternate version 1)	K. Stover, Gaye	7:24
16.	"You're the Man" (alternate version 2)	K. Stover, Gaye	4:44
17.	"Symphony" (demo vocal)	Gaye, Robinson	2:48

Demos, alternate mixes & more (Disc two)
No.	Title	Writer(s)	Length
1.	"Let's Get It On" (demo)	Gaye, Townsend	5:12
2.	"Let's Get It On, Pt. 2" (a.k.a. "Keep Gettin' It On")	Gaye, Townsend	3:13
3.	"Please Don't Stay (Once You Go Away)" (alternate mix)	Gaye, Townsend	3:52
4.	"If I Should Die Tonight" (demo)	Gaye, Townsend	4:13
5.	"Come Get to This" (alternate mix)	Gaye	3:07
6.	"Distant Lover" (alternate mix)	G. Fuqua, Gaye, Greene	4:32
7.	"You Sure Love to Ball" (alternate mix w/alternate vocal)	Gaye	5:06
8.	"Just to Keep You Satisfied" (a capella w/alternate vocal)	Gaye, Gordy-Gaye, Stover	4:38
9.	"Just to Keep You Satisfied" (The Originals 1970 version)	Gaye, Gordy-Gaye, Stover	4:00
10.	"Just to Keep You Satisfied" (The Monitors 1968 version)	Gaye, Gordy-Gaye, Stover	3:10
11.	"Where Are We Going?" (alternate mix)	Gordon, Mizell	3:56
12.	"The World Is Rated X" (alternate mix)	Bolton, Bolton, Gordy, McLeod	3:52
13.	"I'm Gonna Give You Respect"	Hutch	2:56
14.	"Try It, You'll Like It"	Hutch, Wakefield	3:57
15.	"You Are That Special One"	Hutch	3:38
16.	"We Can Make It Baby"	Hutch	3:22
17.	"Running from Love" (instrumental version 1)	Bohannon, Gaye, Henderson	3:47
18.	"Mandota"	Bohannon, Gaye	3:26
19.	"Running from Love" (instrumental version 2)	Bohannon, Gaye, Henderson	3:54
20.	"Come Get to This" (live from Oakland)	Gaye	3:00

=== 2023 Deluxe Edition ===
On August 25, 2023, Let's Get It On was reissued by Motown as a new digital-only Deluxe Edition, which replaced the 2001 Deluxe Edition on streaming platforms. It featured 19 previously unreleased tracks and new mixes of 11 previously released tracks, as well as a new remastering of the original album. The previously unreleased tracks include alternate versions of the 7 songs that comprised the Vulnerable project, which was eventually released in 1997 using vocal takes recorded in 1977. The vocal takes featured here are substantially different and were recorded in 1973.

Original Album
No.	Title	Writer(s)	Length
1.	"Let’s Get It On"	Gaye, Townsend	4:54
2.	"Please Don't Stay (Once You Go Away)"	Gaye, Townsend	3:31
3.	"If I Should Die Tonight" (unedited version)	Gaye, Townsend	4:01
4.	"Keep Gettin’ It On"	Gaye, Townsend	3:11
5.	"Come Get To This"	Gaye	2:42
6.	"Distant Lover"	Gaye, Greene, Gordy Fuqua	4:17
7.	"You Sure Love To Ball"	Gaye	4:45
8.	"Just To Keep You Satisfied"	Gaye, Gordy Gaye, Stover	4:26

Edit versions
No.	Title	Writer(s)	Length
9.	"Let’s Get It On" (single version)	Gaye, Townsend	4:05
10.	"You Sure Love To Ball" (single version)	Gaye	3:35
11.	"If I Should Die Tonight" (original LP edit)	Gaye, Townsend	3:06

Album Bonus Tracks
No.	Title	Writer(s)	Length
12.	"Let’s Get It On" (demo **)	Gaye, Townsend	5:14
13.	"Let’s Get It On – Pt. II (a.k.a. Keep Gettin’ It On)" (**)	Gaye, Townsend	3:23
14.	"I Knew One Day My Day Would Come" (instrumental *)	Gaye, Townsend	3:07
15.	"Interlude #1" (*)	Gaye, Townsend	0:57
16.	"Please Don't Stay (Once You Go Away)" (alternate mix 1 **)	Gaye, Townsend	3:59
17.	"Lovely Lady" (instrumental *)	Gaye, Townsend	3:08
18.	"If I Should Die Tonight" (demo **)	Gaye, Townsend	4:14
19.	"I Don’t Have To Get High To Do It" (instrumental *)	Gaye, Townsend	3:37
20.	"Come Get To This" (alternate mix 1 **)	Gaye	3:06
21.	"Distant Lover" (alternate mix 1 **)	Gaye, Greene, Gordy Fuqua	4:46
22.	"You Sure Love To Ball" (alternate mix 1 w/alternate vocal **)	Gaye	5:11
23.	"Just To Keep You Satisfied" (alternate mix w/alternate vocal **)	Gaye, Gordy Gaye, Stover	4:40
24.	"Interlude #2" (*)	Gaye, Townsend	0:35
25.	"If I Should Die Tonight" (SaLaAM ReMi’s Piano Mix *)	Gaye, Townsend	4:01
26.	"Just To Keep You Satisfied" (John Morales’s Stripped Mix *)	Gaye, Gordy Gaye, Stover	4:35

The David Van DePitte Sessions
No.	Title	Writer(s)	Length
27.	"Song #1" (instrumental *)	Gaye	4:19
28.	"Song #2" (instrumental *)	Gaye	5:34
29.	"Song #3" (instrumental **)	Gaye	5:27
30.	"Song #4" (instrumental / partial vocal *)	Gaye	5:24
31.	"Shake Well" (instrumental *)	Gaye	4:36
32.	"Perfection" (instrumental *)	Gaye	5:30
33.	"Cakes" (instrumental **)	Gaye	3:29
34.	"My Love Is Growing" (**)	Gaye	4:27

Vulnerable: The 1973 vocals
No.	Title	Writer(s)	Length
35.	"She Needs Me" (1973 version *)	Hamilton	3:33
36.	"Why Did I Choose You" (1973 version *)	Leonard, Martin	2:38
37.	"Funny, Not Much" (1973 version *)	Merrill, Neil, Broughton, Prince	2:46
38.	"This Will Make You Laugh" (1973 version *)	Higginbotham	2:55
39.	"The Shadow Of Your Smile" (1973 version *)	Mandel, Webster	3:09
40.	"I Wish I Didn’t Love You So" (1973 version *)	Loesser	2:41
41.	"I Won’t Cry Anymore" (1973 version *)	Frisch, Wise	2:59

* Previously unreleased
** New mix of a previously released bonus track

== Personnel ==
- Orchestral arrangement, Conducting: David Van De Pitte (tracks: 5, 6, 8), Gene Page (track: 5), René Hall (tracks: 1 to 4), David Blumberg (track: 7)
- Bass: James Jamerson, Wilton Felder
- Bongos: Bobbye Hall Porter
- Bongos, Drums: Eddie "Bongo" Brown
- Drums: Paul Humphrey, Uriel Jones
- Engineer: William McKeekin, Art Stewart, Steve Smith, Lawrence Miles, Cal Harris
- Guitar: David T. Walker, Eddie Willis, Louis Shelton, Melvin Ragin, Robert White, Don Peake
- Mallet percussion: Emil Richards
- Percussion (Special treatment): Bobbye Hall Porter
- Saxophone: Ernie Watts, Plas Johnson
- Piano: Joe Sample, Marvin Gaye, Marvin Jerkins
- Photography: Jim Britt, Motown Archives
- Production, lead vocals, background vocals: Marvin Gaye, except where noted:
  - Background vocals: The Originals ("Just to Keep You Satisfied")
  - Co-production: Ed Townsend (tracks: 1 to 4)
- Vibraphone: Emil Richards, Victor Feldman

== Charts ==
=== Weekly charts ===
Chart (1973)	Peak position
US Billboard Top LPs	2
US Billboard Soul LPs	1
US Record World Top LPs	1
US Cashbox Tops LPs	1
Chart (1984)	Peak position
US Billboard Top 200	127

Chart (2025)	Peak position
Greek Albums (IFPI)	22

=== Year-end charts ===
Chart (1973)	Peak positions
U.S. Billboard Top Soul Albums	29

Chart (1974)	Peak positions
U.S. Billboard Pop Albums	46
U.S. Billboard Top Soul Albums	8

== Certifications ==
Region	Certification	Certified units/sales
Denmark (IFPI Danmark)	Gold	45,000^{‡}
United Kingdom (BPI)	Gold	100,000^{‡}
^{‡} Sales+streaming figures based on certification alone.

== See also ==
- List of 1970s albums considered the best
- List of number-one R&B albums of 1973 (U.S.)
- Smooth soul

== Bibliography ==
- David Ritz (1991). Divided Soul: The Life of Marvin Gaye. New York: Da Capo Press. ISBN 0-306-80443-3.
- Marvin Gaye, David Ritz, Ed Townsend, Ben Edmonds, Harry Weinger (2001). Let's Get It On. booklet liner notes (Deluxe ed.). Motown Records, a Division of UMG Recordings, Inc. MOTD 4757.
- Nick Johnstone (1999). Melody Maker History of 20th Century Popular Music. Bloomsbury, London, UK. ISBN 0-7475-4190-6.
- Michael Eric Dyson (2005). Mercy, Mercy Me: The Art, Loves and Demons of Marvin Gaye. Basic Civitas Books. ISBN 0-465-01770-3.
- Nathan Brackett; Christian Hoard (2004). The New Rolling Stone Album Guide. Completely Revised and Updated 4th Edition. Simon and Schuster. ISBN 0-7432-0169-8.
- Colin Larkin (2002). Virgin Encyclopedia of Popular Music. Edition 4. Virgin Books. ISBN 1-85227-923-0.
