= Punk Rock Song =

Single by Bad Religion

from the album The Gray Race
- Released: 1996
- Recorded: October–November 1995 at Electric Lady Studios, New York City, New York
- Genre: Punk rock, melodic hardcore
- Length: 2:26
- Label: Atlantic Records
- Songwriter(s): Greg Graffin
- Producer(s): Ric Ocasek

Bad Religion singles chronology
"A Walk" (1996)	"Punk Rock Song" (1996)	"Dream of Unity" (1997)

"Punk Rock Song" is a song written by Greg Graffin from the punk rock group Bad Religion. It was the second single from their 1996 album, The Gray Race. While the single never charted in the U.S., it is Bad Religion's highest charting single in Finland, Germany and Sweden.

== Single information ==
The single was initially available in a number of different formats. A 7" single is gray marbled vinyl on Unplayable Records, and features two unreleased compositions, "The Universal Cynic" and "The Dodo". A CD single also features the two unreleased tracks as well as "Punk Rock Song" sung in German and it has the lyrics to the two unreleased tracks plus the English and German lyrics to "Punk Rock Song". The "German language version" was also included as a bonus track on the European version of The Gray Race. There is also a single which has live versions of "Modern Day Catastrophists" and "10 in 2010".

There is also a CD single made purposely for the UK (it has the dates of the UK concerts that were eventually canceled printed on it). In this version, the words "shit" and "fucking" had been censored. Every time Greg says "so many other...insects/robots out there" his voice is completely cut out. There is also a promotional CD which has no insert, just the CD, which is red, and has the title and some other info written on it in plain, silver text; and it came with a promotional poster.

== Trivia ==
- The 2002 compilation Punk Rock Songs, which was not endorsed by the band, is named after the song. The English and German versions appear on the compilation.
- In April 1996, "Punk Rock Song" was number 17 on the European MTV, above Green Day and Bon Jovi.
- At the end of the song, you can hear guitarist Brian Baker shouting "yes! Bobby Schayer...that's the one", referring to the band's drummer at the time.
- This song was also in the video game Crazy Taxi 3.

== Chart positions ==
Chart (1996)	Peak position
Australia (ARIA)	191
Finland (Suomen virallinen lista)	5
Germany (GfK)	29
Sweden (Sverigetopplistan)	21
