= If I Should Die Tonight =

Song by Marvin Gaye

from the album Let's Get It On
- Released: 1973
- Recorded: 1973, Hitsville West, Los Angeles, California
- Genre: Soul, R&B
- Length: 3:57
- Label: Tamla
- Songwriter(s): Marvin Gaye; Ed Townsend
- Producer(s): Marvin Gaye; Ed Townsend

Official audio
- "If I Should Die Tonight" on YouTube

"If I Should Die Tonight" is a song written by songwriter Ed Townsend and American recording artist Marvin Gaye. Gaye recorded the track, a soul ballad, for his Let's Get It On album. It was issued as the third track on the album's set list.

== Background ==
According to Ed Townsend, he wrote this song after an encounter with a woman he "admired from afar". The woman convinced Townsend that they could not "build happiness on the misery of others", as they both were in relationships with other people. He told her she was right and, as he was prepared to walk away from her for the last time, she asked, "is that all you have to say?", to which he responded, "no...if I should die tonight, Lord, before my time, I won't die blue 'cause I've known you."

Townsend later returned home where he later wrote out the rest of lyrics. He felt the song would be better suited for Gaye to record. But Gaye, known notoriously for not being able to sing a song unless the lyrics pertained to him personally whether he wrote them or not, turned the song down initially. He explained to Townsend, "I can't sing that song. I've never felt that way about a woman in my life." Subsequently, during the session for the album's title track, he met his future second wife, Janis Hunter. After a date, Gaye returned to the studio and exclaimed to Townsend, "Ed, get that song out. I can sing that sonovabitch now!"

== Composition ==
Townsend provided the lyrics to the song while Gaye helped write the song's melody. The song is composed as a soul ballad with emotional deliveries from Gaye throughout it. In the song, Gaye discusses his love for a woman he knows from afar and claims that if he was to die tonight, he wouldn't die sad because of his knowledge of his love crush.

The song was placed third on the set list of Let's Get It On, quickly after the song "Please Stay (Once You Go Away)" ends. The song opens with orchestral string arrangements before Gaye begins singing. Like most of his songs on the album, Gaye sings two leads in the song. In an alternate version later released on the deluxe edition issue of Let's Get It On, one of the leads sings the song without help from the other lead. As the song reaches its climax, Gaye sings the final chorus a cappella before the strings come back to finish the song in a flourish.

== Samples ==
"If I Should Die Tonight" was sampled by several acts over the years. Puff Daddy used the song as a vocal interlude on his album, No Way Out, featuring Carl Thomas. It was also sampled by other rap musicians such as Danny! on the song "Grateful", Butta Verses featuring Lucian on the song "If I Die", King C.L.O. on "One Day to Live", New Era on "Before I Die Tonight", Big K.R.I.T. on the song "If I Should Die" and by Berthex on the song "If I Should Die Tonight". The song's melody and riff was interpolated for R&B singers Avant and Keke Wyatt's 2013 R&B hit, "You & I". It was also sampled on John Legend's song, "Who Do We Think We Are" ft. Rick Ross.

== Personnel ==
- All vocals by Marvin Gaye
- Produced by Marvin Gaye and Ed Townsend

== Sources ==
- Edmonds, Ben (2001). Let's Get It On (Deluxe ed.). Motown Records, a Division of UMG Recordings, Inc. MOTD 4757.
