= David Ritz =

American author

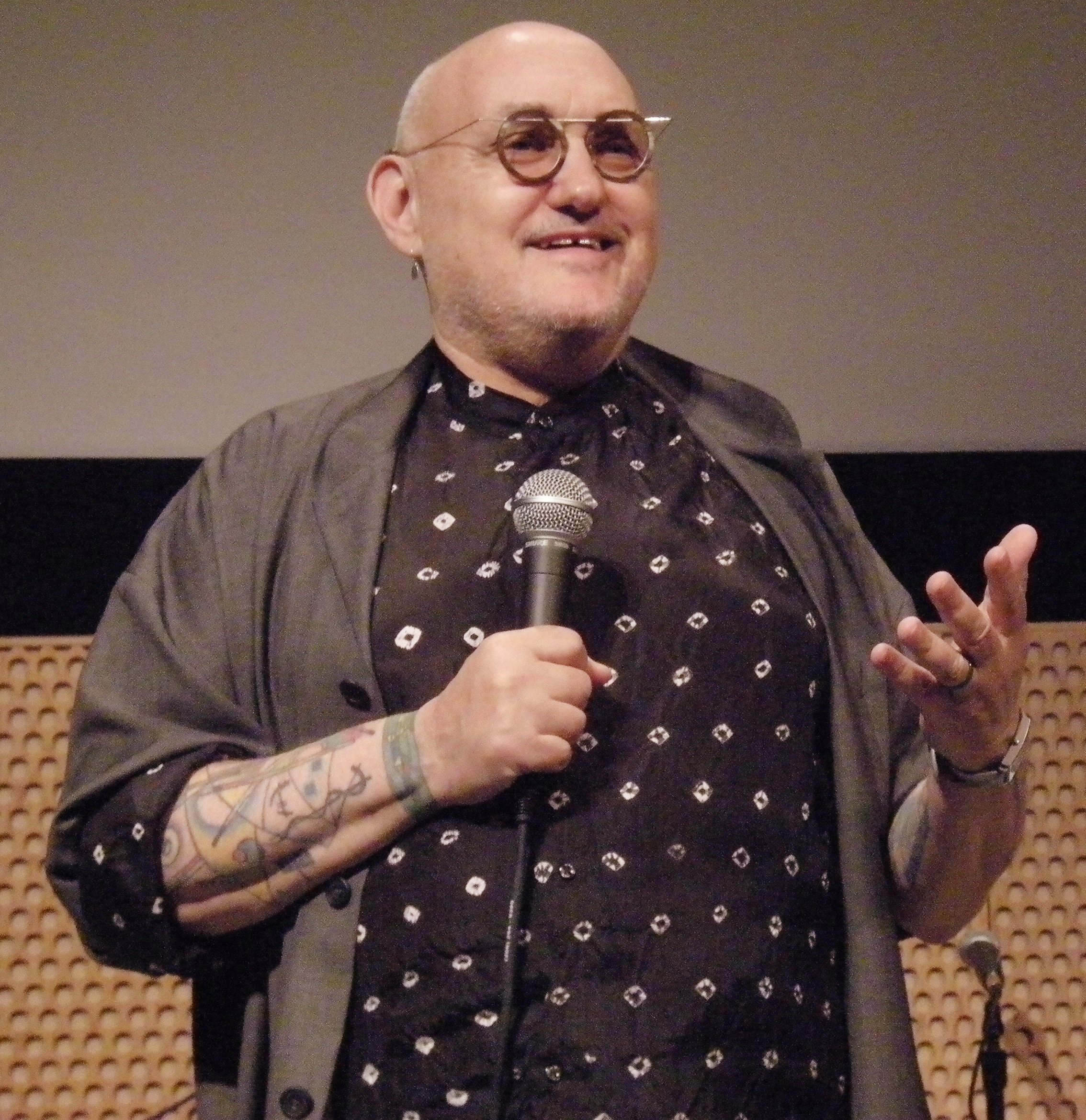
- Ritz in 2008
- Born: December 2, 1943 (age 82); New York City, U.S.
- Occupation: Author
- Years active: 1970–present
- Spouse: Roberta Michele Ritz (m. 1968)
- Children: 2

David Ritz (born December 2, 1943) is an American author. He has written novels, biographies, magazine articles, and over a hundred liner notes for artists such as Aretha Franklin, Ray Charles, and Nat King Cole. He has coauthored 36 autobiographies, including some celebrities' autobiographies.

== Career and bibliography ==
=== As a biographer ===
Ritz's first collaboration was Brother Ray (1978), the autobiography of Ray Charles. Ritz has said that his initial intention was to write a biography until becoming intrigued by the idea of rendering the book entirely in Charles' voice. "That's when I discovered I had a gift for channeling voice", Ritz told the L.A. Times' Patrick Goldstein in 2012. "That discovery changed the course of my literary life."

Other autobiographies co-written by Ritz include:

- Living and Loving Out Loud: A Memoir, Cornel West with David Ritz
- Divided Soul: The Life of Marvin Gaye began when Ritz met Gaye in the late seventies and was published in 1985, a year after the singer's death.
- Rhythm And The Blues: A Life in American Music (1993) with Jerry Wexler
- Rage To Survive: The Etta James Story (1995) with Etta James
- Blues All Around Me: The Autobiography of B. B. King (1996) with B. B. King
- The Brothers Neville (2000) with the Neville Brothers
- Journey of a Thousand Miles: My Story (2008) with Lang Lang
- True You: A Journey to Finding and Loving Yourself (2011) with Janet Jackson
- When I Left Home: My Story (2012) with Buddy Guy
- On Time: A Princely Life in Funk (2019) with Morris Day
- I’m Your Huckleberry (2020) with Val Kilmer
- Me and Sister Bobbie (2020) with Willie Nelson
- Let Love Rule (2020) with Lenny Kravitz
- KG – A to Z (2021) with Kevin Garnett
- Me and Paul – Untold Stories of a Fabled Friendship (2022) with Willie Nelson
- Share My Life (2023) with Kem
- Livin' on a Prayer: Big Songs, Big Life (2023) with Desmond Child
- Energy Follows Through: The Stories Behind My Songs (2023) with Willie Nelson

Ritz has also written an inspirational book. Messengers, a portrait of African-American gospel singers and ministers, was published in 2006, as well as a memoir, The God Groove, in 2019.

=== As a novelist ===
Ritz's fiction ranges from sports fantasies--The Man Who Brought the Dodgers Back To Brooklyn (1981)-- to jazz fantasies--Blue Notes Under a Green Felt Hat (1989) and Barbells and Saxophones (1989).

Ritz collaborated with Mable John on three Christian novels: Sanctified (2006), Stay Out of the Kitchen (2007) and Love Tornado (2008). He has also collaborated with rapper T.I. on two novels— Power and Beauty (2011) and Trouble and Triumph (2012).

In 2016, Ritz collaborated with Willie Nelson on the novel Pretty Paper.

=== As a children’s book author ===
Brayden Speaks Up: How One Boy Inspired America (2021) with Brayden Harrington. Jason Goes For It (2023) with Brayden Harrington

=== As a lyricist ===
The platinum-selling song "Sexual Healing" was written in Ostend, Belgium, in April 1982 and is credited as a collaboration between Marvin Gaye, Odell Brown, and Ritz. Ritz was not originally credited as songwriter. Ritz sued Marvin Gaye for songwriting credit; Ritz received credit only after settling with Marvin Gaye's estate after the singer's death. Ritz claims that the lawsuit was settled because he had interview tapes with Marvin Gaye in which Gaye says, "These are great lyrics you wrote."

Ritz's songs have also been recorded by Smokey Robinson, the Isley Brothers and Kem. David Ritz co-wrote three songs including the title track from Guy King's 2016 album Truth.

Ritz co-wrote “Brothers in the Night,” theme song for the 1983 film Uncommon Valor.

=== As a journalist ===
“Happy Song: Soul Music in the Ghetto,” Ritz's first critical essay, was published in Salmagundi (1970). Dozens of other articles have followed, including “History of the Jews of Dallas,” D Magazine (1974); “Kids’ Stuff: Jackson Pollock, Jimmie Vaughan and the Architecture of Las Vegas,” Art Connoisseur (1998); “Show and Tell,” introduction to Rolling Stone's Tattoo Nation (2002); the forward to Lady Sings the Blues, the 50th-anniversary edition of the autobiography of Billie Holiday (2006); and “The Last Days of Brother Ray,” included in Da Capo's Best Music Writing of 2005.

== Personal life ==
Ritz graduated from the University of Texas in Austin in 1966 (Magna Cum Laude/Phi Beta Kappa), and received a Masters of Arts from the State University of New York at Buffalo in 1970, where he studied with literary critic Leslie Fiedler.

He has been married to Roberta Michele Ritz since 1968. They have two children, twins Alison and Jessica, born in 1974.

Ritz was born into a Jewish family, and was baptized as a Christian in 2004.

== Awards ==
- 1992 Grammy, Best Album Notes for Aretha Franklin's Queen Of Soul – The Atlantic Recordings

- Ritz has also been nominated for four additional Grammys: “Ray Charles 50th Anniversary Collection,” Liner Notes (1997); “Ray Charles 50th Anniversary Collection,” Producer (1997); “Ray Charles—Pure Genius,” Liner Notes (2005); “Aretha Franklin—The Golden Reign,” Liner Notes (2008).

- 1993 Ralph J. Gleason Award for Jerry Wexler: Rhythm and the Blues.
- 1995 Ralph J. Gleason Award for Etta James: Rage to Survive.
- 1996 Ralph J. Gleason Award for B. B. King’s Blues All Around Me
- 2000 Ralph J. Gleason Award for the Neville Brothers' The Brothers Neville
- 2006 ASCAP Deems Taylor Award for liner notes of Johnny “Guitar” Watson: The Funk Anthology, released by Shout! Factory
- 2011 ASCAP Deems Taylor Award for liner notes of Nat King Cole & Friends: Riffin, released by Verve/Hip-O Select.com/Universal Music Enterprises
- 2013 Living Blues Reader's Poll, Best Book for When I Left Home: My Story – Buddy Guy and David Ritz – Da Capo Press
- 2013 Association for Recorded Sound Award for Best Historical Research in Blues/Gospel/Hip-hop/R&B for When I Left Home: My Story – Buddy Guy and David Ritz – Da Capo
- 2013 ASCAP Timothy White Award for Outstanding Musical Biography for When I Left Home: My Story- Buddy Guy and David Ritz
