= Kenneth Stover =

American singer-songwriter (1948–2010)

Kenneth C. Stover (born August 21, 1948 in Athens, Georgia, United States – December 2010, in Cleveland, Ohio) was an American Motown songwriter, producer, and singer. He contributed background vocals on Marvin Gaye's 1971 album What's Going On and wrote the first draft of Gaye's 1973 single "Let's Get It On".

== Career ==
Stover and his brother Elgie moved to Detroit, Michigan, to work with their cousin Harvey Fuqua on his Tri-Phi record label. They befriended Marvin Gaye and members of the Motown family. In the late 1960s the Stover brothers signed to Motown's Jobete Music as staff songwriters. Stover contributed background vocals on Gaye's "Inner City Blues (Make Me Wanna Holler)", and later co-wrote Gaye's "You're the Man" (1972). In 1973, Stover wrote the original rough draft of "Let's Get It On" and presented the song to Gaye as a political song.

Stover also co-wrote the Diana Ross song, "Lovin', Livin' and Givin'" and two songs by Bobby Nunn, "Sexy Sassy" and "Got to Get Up on It". In the mid-1970s, Stover formed the soul group Leo's Sunshipp with Johnny Simone and Alvin Few, but canceled the group's planned album when Simone died of cancer. A 12' was released on Lyons Records and this record and a CD were also later released by Expansion Records. In 1978, Stover was part of a Motown collective called Finished Touch.

He left Motown in 1981 and settled in Atlanta, Georgia for a brief time. A song he co-wrote called "Good Combination" was released by Peabo Bryson as a single, and the song went on to be sampled, giving Stover royalty cheques especially after the song's instrumental was covered by Will Smith and Faith Evans.

== Personal life ==
Stover grew up in Cleveland, Ohio. Stover moved back to Cleveland in 1985 to take care of his sister, but he continued to write and produce music, later as part of Kenrou Music & Publishing. He died in December 2010.

== Studio albums ==
with Leo's Sunshipp

- We Need Each Other (Lyons, 1978)

with Finished Touch

- Need to Know You Better (Motown, 1978)
