= You Sure Love to Ball =

Single by Marvin Gaye

from the album Let's Get It On
- B-side: "Just to Keep You Satisfied"
- Released: January 2, 1974
- Recorded: 1973, Hitsville West, Los Angeles, CA
- Genre: Soul
- Length: 4:46 (album version); 3:35 (single mix)
- Label: Tamla; T 54244
- Songwriter(s): Marvin Gaye
- Producer(s): Marvin Gaye

Marvin Gaye singles chronology
"Come Get to This" (1973)	"You Sure Love to Ball" (1974)	"My Mistake (Was to Love You)" (1974)

"You Sure Love to Ball" is a song released by American recording artist Marvin Gaye. Released on January 2, 1974, it was the third and final single to be released from Gaye's album, Let's Get It On.

== Song overview ==
Unlike most of the material on Let's Get It On, which focused more on romance music including a brief social plea ("Keep Gettin' It On"), this song focused entirely on the sexual portion of its subject. The song starts off with a rhythm section including guitars, a bass and drums and a saxophone solo. In the middle of the solo, induced moans can be heard from a couple before Gaye finally begins singing the lyrics. The term "ball" was slang for having sex.

Cash Box said it was "full of that good Marvin Gaye feel." Record World said that "this tune is plaintively sung with all the soul that the master can muster."

== Chart performance ==
The song was issued as a single on January 2, 1974. Initial radio airplay was good enough for the song to peak at 13 on the Hot Soul Singles chart and 50 on the Billboard Hot 100. However, "You Sure Love to Ball" soon peaked out allegedly due to the controversial nature of the track, making the song the least successful of the three tracks released on Let's Get It On. Its b-side included the solemn ballad closer of the album, "Just to Keep You Satisfied".

== Covers and samples ==
In 1976, singer Sylvia covered the song. Singer Will Downing later covered the song for the Marvin tribute album, Marvin Is 60: A Tribute Album as did Keith Washington on his 1998 album, KW. Usher's 2001 song, "Twork It Out" from his 8701 album, featured heavy sampling of "You Sure Love to Ball".

== Sources ==
- Dyson, Eric Michael (2004). Mercy Mercy Me: The Art, Loves and Demons of Marvin Gaye. New York/Philadelphia: Basic Civitas. ISBN 0-465-01769-X.
