= Stranger than Fiction (Bad Religion song) =

Single by Bad Religion

from the album Stranger than Fiction
- Released: 1994
- Recorded: 1994
- Genre: Punk rock, skate punk
- Length: 2:20
- Label: Atlantic
- Songwriter(s): Brett Gurewitz
- Producer(s): Andy Wallace; Bad Religion

Bad Religion singles chronology
"Infected" (1994)	"Stranger than Fiction" (1994)	"Incomplete" (1995)

Music video
- "Stranger than Fiction" on YouTube

"Stranger than Fiction" is a song by American punk rock band Bad Religion, featured on their 1994 album with the same title.

More than a decade after its release, "Stranger Than Fiction" remains one of the band's concert staples. The live version also appears on their 2006 live DVD Live at the Palladium.

At a Bad Religion concert in 1996, frontman Greg Graffin sang "I wanna know why Gurewitz cracked, sometimes truth is stranger than fiction", referring to then-former and now-current guitarist Brett Gurewitz, as opposed to "I want to know why Hemingway cracked, sometimes truth is stranger than fiction". In other shows Graffin substitutes the line "Life is the crummiest book I ever read" with "Life is the shittiest book I ever read"

== Single release ==
There is a 10" one-sided picture disc promo with the crossbuster symbol of which Dragnet only released 1,000 copies (also has Individual). There's a promo CD single which explains that "the talents of BR have been acknowledged by several critically noted scribes, including British music watchdogs NME and Melody Maker, as well as Rolling Stone, Spin, the Los Angeles Times and Chicago Tribune, Playboy and Village Voice among many others. (...) truly, nothing compares to the sheer power of BR live". It also has a sticker with a quotation from Charles M. Young: "true believer punks from L.A., Bad Religion have mastered its art form, creating defiant, burning music...".

The German single has "Leaders and Followers" (which appears as a bonus track on the Japanese version of the Stranger Than Fiction album; it is also included on the Clerks Original Soundtrack) and "Mediocrity", and all the European dates for the STF Tour.

== Charts ==
Chart (1994–1995)	Peak position
Australia (ARIA)	115
US Modern Rock Tracks	28
