= Come Get to This =

Single by Marvin Gaye

from the album Let's Get It On
- B-side: "Distant Lover"
- Released: October 11, 1973
- Recorded: November 3, 1970 at Hitsville, USA, Detroit, Michigan); July 9–10, 1973 (over-dubbing) at Hitsville West, Hollywood, California
- Genre: Pop; soul; quiet storm
- Length: 2:41
- Label: Tamla
- Songwriter: Marvin Gaye
- Producer: Marvin Gaye

Marvin Gaye singles chronology
"You're a Special Part of Me" (1973)	"Come Get to This" (1973)	"You Sure Love to Ball" (1974)

Audio sample
- file; help

"Come Get to This" is a song written and recorded by American recording artist Marvin Gaye. It was released as the second single off Gaye's album, Let's Get It On following the success of the single "Let's Get It On". Recording sessions for the song first occurred in 1970 when Gaye worked on the song in a demo format while he made What's Going On.

Gaye then shelved the recording for three years before revisiting it as he began assessing the track listing for Let's Get It On. The song was remixed and edited at Motown's Hollywood-based recording studios in 1973. The song's composition and record production was inspired by the Motown Sound of the 1960s and the lyrics reflected a man's joy over the return of an old lover. The strong response from Motown executives upon hearing the song prompted the label to issue the song as the second single as a possible follow-up hit to "Let's Get It On".

The song found major success though modestly compared to "Let's Get It On", reaching number 21 on the Billboard Hot 100 and number 3 on the Hot Soul Singles chart, selling over a quarter million copies. Gaye performed the song while appearing on Soul Train in 1974. The musician performed the song in its original sound during his 1974–1975 US tour. Midway through the 1970s, Gaye altered the song as a warm-up to "Let's Get It On" performing it in a seductive blues-oriented style. This alteration would continue to be used until his final US tour in 1983. During a rehearsal of his Belgium concert in 1981, Gaye performed the song in its original version on piano.

According to Billboard, "Come Get to This" "segues from soul to pop and back" within the limits of the song. Cash Box said that "the easy flow here and super rhythm section hugging Marvin’s vocals will delight his fans." Record World predicted that it "should be another top seller" for Gaye.

== Personnel ==
- All vocals by Marvin Gaye
- Instrumentation by the Funk Brothers and the Detroit Symphony Orchestra
