= American Jesus =

1993 single by Bad Religion

Single by Bad Religion

from the album Recipe for Hate
- Released: 1993
- Genre: Punk rock
- Length: 3:18
- Label: Atlantic, Sympathy For The Record Industry, Semaphore Records
- Songwriters: Brett Gurewitz, Greg Graffin
- Producer: Bad Religion

Bad Religion singles chronology
"Atomic Garden" (1992)	"American Jesus" (1993)	"Struck a Nerve" (1993)

"American Jesus" is a song by American punk rock band Bad Religion. It was the first single from their 1993 album Recipe for Hate and their second all-time single, after signing to Atlantic Records. Eddie Vedder of Pearl Jam provides backing vocals on the track.

== Explanation ==
"American Jesus" takes on the idea that God favors America, rather than other countries. Greg Graffin said "During the Gulf War, George Bush said, 'We'll win, because God is on our side!'. What an amazing statement!" The song touches on antisemitism, war, and religion as an excuse.

== Music video ==
The video is entirely in sepia tone. It shows the band driving around in a car through Los Angeles, with various pedestrians carrying crosses around the city with blindfolds on. The video cuts to clips of the band performing in the desert as well as Graffin walking through the city. It ends with the civilians chanting "one nation, under God" while standing in a row.

== Track listing ==
Atlantic CD Promo

1. "American Jesus" (radio remix version)

Sympathy For The Record Industry 7" Single

1. "American Jesus"
2. "Stealth"

Semaphore Records CD Promo

1. "American Jesus"
2. "Skyscraper"

== See also ==
- List of anti-war songs
