= Elgie Stover =

American songwriter and composer (1938–2011)

- Born: September 12, 1938; Athens, Georgia, U.S.
- Origin: Cleveland, Ohio, U.S.
- Died: July 11, 2011 (aged 72) Hilton Head Island, South Carolina
- Genres: R&B, soul
- Occupations: Songwriter
- Label: Motown

Elgie Rousseau Stover (September 12, 1938 – July 11, 2011) was an American songwriter, composer, producer and background singer, most famous for his associations with cousin Harvey Fuqua and Marvin Gaye, co-writing two of Gaye's songs from the singer's 1971 album, What's Going On.

Growing up in Cleveland, Ohio, Stover and his brother Kenneth later moved to Detroit, where the brothers worked closely with Harvey Fuqua on his Tri-Phi Records label. In the late-1960s, after befriending staff from Motown, the brothers signed with the label as staff songwriters and producers. Stover's most famous works came as the result of working so closely with Gaye, with whom he and Kenneth had befriended shortly after they signed with Motown.

Stover co-wrote with Marvin, wife Anna and Iris Gordy on The Originals' 1970 classic, "The Bells". A year later, Stover's greatest contribution came when he took part in co-writing "Flying High in the Friendly Sky" and "God is Love" on Marvin's What's Going On. He is credited as the voice that helps open the hit "What's Going On" with "hey man, what's happening?" and "everything is everything". Stover later co-wrote Gaye's 1973 ballad, "Just to Keep You Satisfied". Stover is vocally heard shouting and screaming on a demo version of Gaye's later hit, "Distant Lover", from a November 1970 session as Gaye struggled with Motown over releasing the "What's Going On" single.

In later years, he served as caterer for Bill Clinton and his Secret Service men.

Stover died on 11 July 2011, at Hilton Head Hospital in Hilton Head Island, South Carolina. He was survived by a wife, Emma Jones, sons David, Monroe and LaDell, daughters Terri and Tonya and sister Alma.
