= Infected (song) =

Single by Bad Religion

from the album Stranger Than Fiction
- Released: 1994
- Recorded: 1994
- Genre: Punk rock; alternative rock
- Length: 4:08
- Label: Atlantic
- Songwriter: Brett Gurewitz
- Producers: Andy Wallace; Bad Religion

Bad Religion singles chronology
"21st Century (Digital Boy)" (1994)	"Infected" (1994)	"Incomplete" (1995)

Music video
- "Infected" on YouTube

"Infected" is a song by American punk rock band Bad Religion, written by Brett Gurewitz. It was released as a single in 1994 and appears on their eighth studio album, Stranger Than Fiction. Along with "21st Century (Digital Boy)", "Infected" is considered to be their breakthrough song, as it received airplay from modern rock radio stations. It is also a live staple for the band.

During the 1990s, frontman Greg Graffin used to sing "don't be mad about it, Bobby", referring to then-drummer Bobby Schayer, instead of "don't be mad about it, baby".

It was a mid-tempo song. Gurewitz said: "Nirvana had proven that as long as the tempo doesn't freak anybody out, you can get on the radio with loud guitars. 'Infected' was my attempt at writing a grunge song."

The song is about a dark, unhealthy romance where one partner is "afflicted" and the other is "addicted".

== Reception ==
AllMusic claimed the song along with "Television" are the "two least effective songs of their 15 years". Billboard described the song as "not for the musak crowd, but it is an absolute must for programmers of modern rock radio".

== Charts ==
Chart (1995)	Peak position
Billboard Album Rock Tracks	33
Billboard Modern Rock Tracks	27
