= Divided Soul =

1985 biography of Marvin Gaye by David Ritz

- Author: David Ritz
- Language: English
- Genre: Non-fiction biography
- Publisher: Da Capo Press
- Publication date: 1985
- Publication place: United States
- Media type: Print (hardcover, paperback)
- Pages: 367
- ISBN: 0-306-80443-3 Reprint. Originally published: New York : McGraw-Hill, 1985. With new introd. and an updated discography. Includes discography (p. 341-348).
- OCLC: 812127396
- Dewey Decimal: 782.42/1644/092 B
- LC Class: ML420.G305 R6 1991

Divided Soul: The Life of Marvin Gaye is a 1985 biography of American soul singer Marvin Gaye. The biography was written by music reviewer David Ritz including conversations he had with the singer, who put the biography together shortly after Gaye's death at the hands of his father Marvin Gay Sr. in 1984.

== History ==
The book came together after Gaye had contacted Ritz shortly after seeing a review Ritz had given on Rolling Stone about the album, Here, My Dear, criticizing critics who he felt didn't get Marvin's message in the album, which was panned at the time of its release in late 1978.

Gaye and Ritz had ongoing conversations of the singer's life story, most of it recorded on audio tape. In 1982, while visiting Gaye in Belgium where he was on a self-imposed exile, Ritz continued work on the autobiography when Ritz searched Gaye's room finding explicit comic books, telling the singer, who struggled with depression and other issues, that he "needed sexual healing". An inspired Marvin convinced Ritz to write a few lyrics for what would be Marvin's comeback hit, "Sexual Healing". Gaye and Ritz continued conversations over the biography through 1983 when Gaye went on his U.S. tour promoting his Midnight Love album.

Their interviews ended abruptly after Gaye was shot and killed by his father on April 1, 1984. Devastated over Marvin's death, Ritz began writing the book and took quotes that Marvin had recited to him over his life from his troubled childhood being brought up in the Pentecostal faith by his father and suffering physical abuse from the same man, to his breakthrough years with Motown and his depression over the death of Tammi Terrell and his tumultuous relationships with Berry Gordy and his two wives Anna Gordy and Janis Hunter. The book was released in 1985 and became a best-seller upon release. A paperback edition was released the following year.

Ritz later re-released a new edition in 2003.

== Versions ==
- Ritz, David (1986). Divided Soul: The Life of Marvin Gaye. Cambridge, Mass: Da Capo Press. ISBN 0-306-81191-X
- Ritz, David. Divided Soul: the Life of Marvin Gaye (2003 edition, ISBN 0-306-81191-X)
