= Guy King =

Israeli blues and jazz guitarist (born 1977)

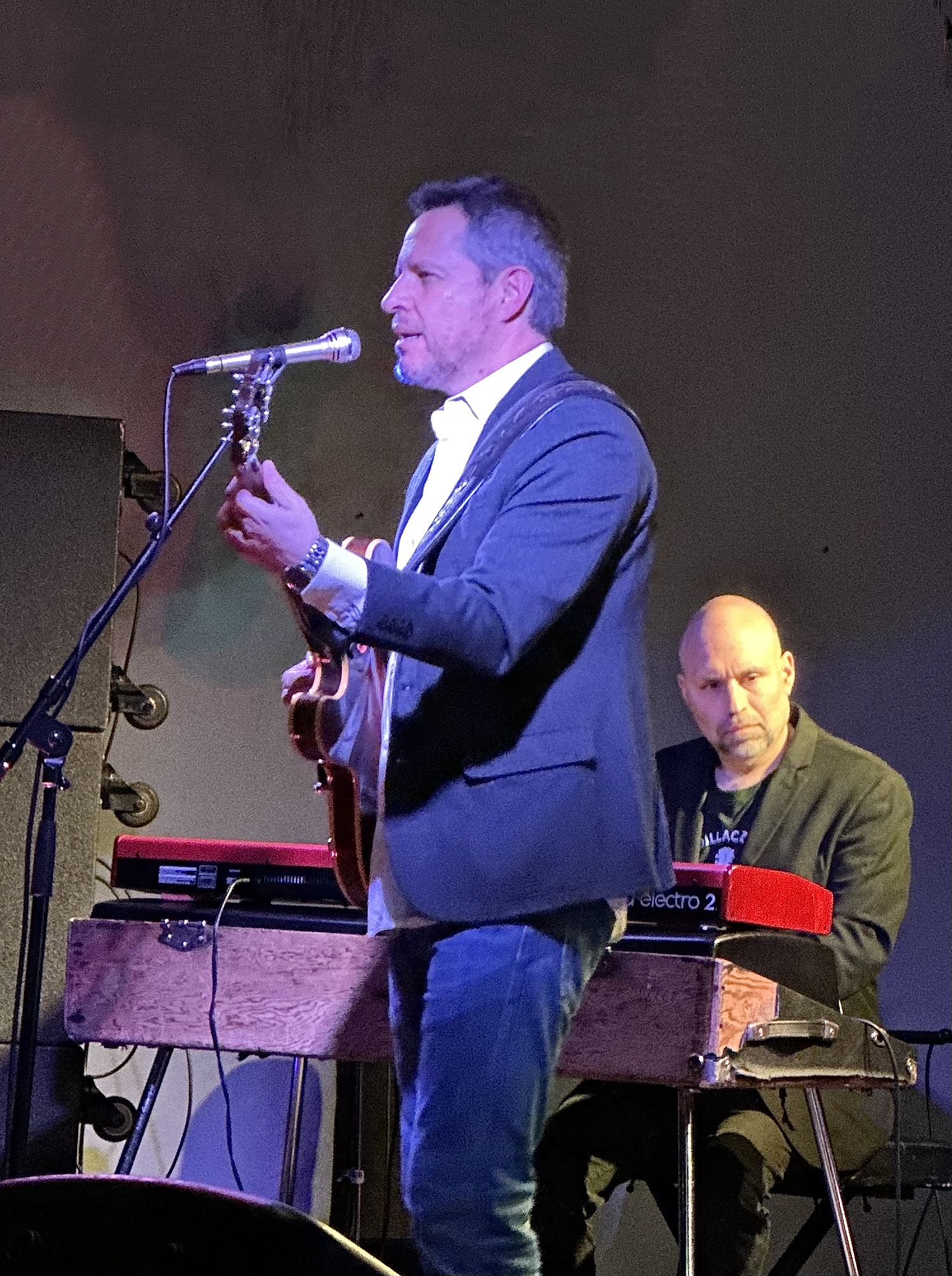
- Guy King performing in Wisconsin (2022)
- Born: 1977 (age 48–49); Israel
- Spouse: Sarah Fringero
- Children: One daughter
- Musical career
- Genres: Blues; soul; jazz
- Occupations: Musician, singer-songwriter
- Instruments: Guitar; vocals
- Years active: 1999–present
- Label: Delmark Records
- Website: guyking.net

Guy King (born 1977) is an Israeli-born blues and jazz guitarist and singer who now lives in Chicago, Illinois, United States. Guy King's playing style has been influenced by many jazz, soul and blues musicians which include B.B. King, and Albert King.

== Early life ==
King was born and raised in Israel. He was exposed bossa nova and salsa as a child. At age 7 King played the clarinet, and at 10 years old, he was part of a conservatory orchestra. When he was 13, he began playing guitar.

At 16 he toured the United States with an Israeli singing group. King had to serve three years of compulsory military service in Israel. Just Twelve days after King was discharged from the military in 1999 (age 21), King moved to Memphis, Tennessee. After a short time in Memphis, King then moved to New Orleans before settling in Chicago.

== Career ==
=== Willie Kent and His Gents ===
King was in Chicago blues singer Willie Kent's band The Gents for six years, becoming Kent's bandleader. After Kent died, King for a time wanted to play less and declined an offer to lead the band. He subsequently began his solo career.

=== Solo career ===
King began his solo career in 2006. In 2009, King released his first solo album, Livin' It, and two more albums, I Am Who I Am And It Is What It Is and By Myself. In 2015, King signed with Delmark Records and Delmark released his 2016 album Truth. In 2021 he released the studio album Joy Is Coming.

== Style and legacy ==
King is known for an unusual technique of plucking the strings with the side of his thumb. The way King holds his guitar and plucks the strings is similar to the jazz musician Wes Montgomery. His style has been described as "eclectic".

== Musical equipment ==
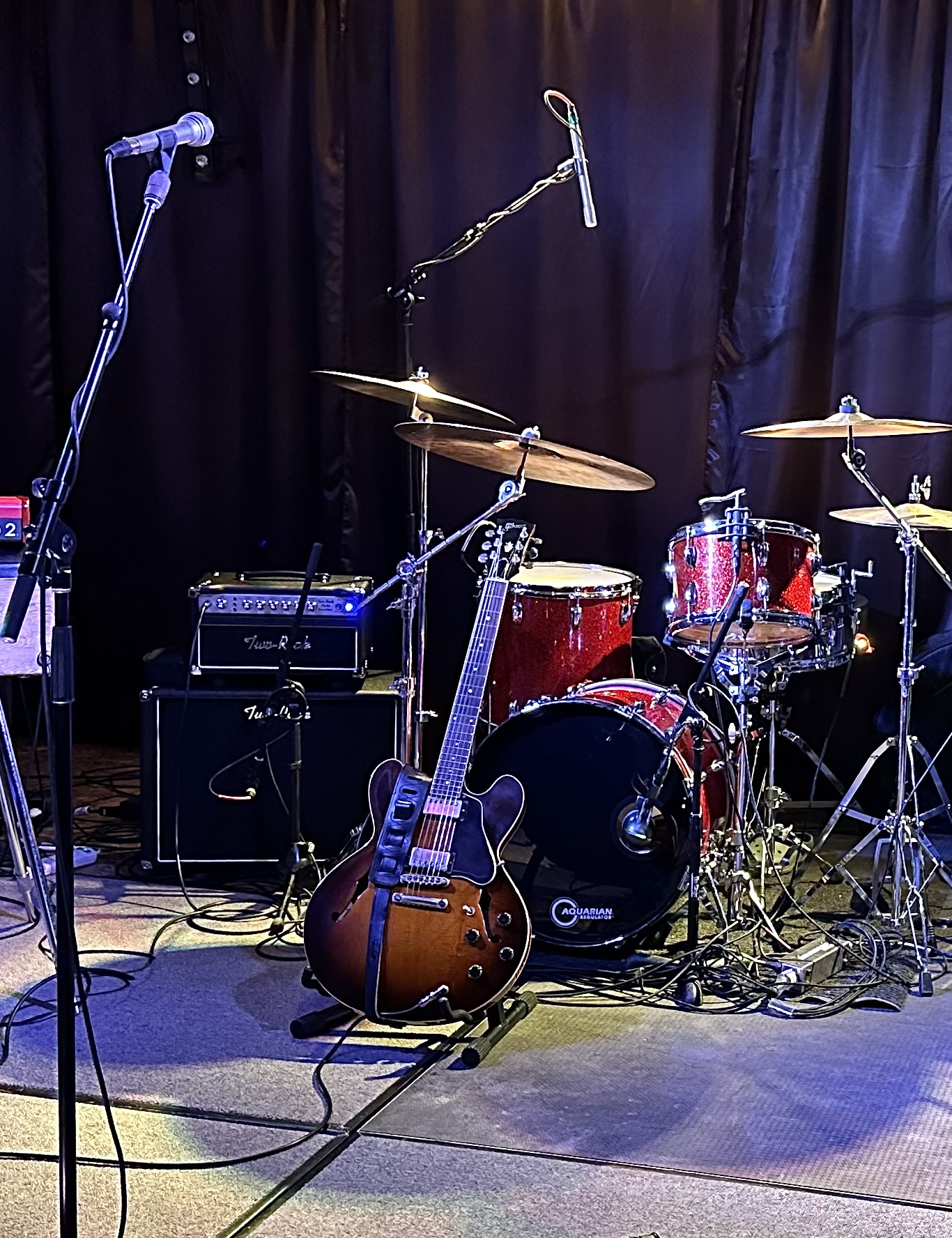
Guy King's rig before his performance at Smoke on the Water in Okauchee, Wisconsin

=== Guitars ===
- 1982 Gibson ES-335TDN
- 1982 Gibson ES-335TD

=== Amplifiers ===
- 1966 Fender Pro Reverb
- Two-Rock amplifier

== Discography ==
- Livin' It (2008)
- By Myself (2012
- I Am Who I Am and It Is What It Is (2012)
- Truth (2016)
- Joy Is Coming (2021)

== Personal life ==
He is married to Sarah Marie Young.

== See also ==
- Fingerstyle guitar
- Jazz guitar
- Chicago blues
