= The Gray Race =

Studio album by Bad Religion
- Released: February 27, 1996
- Recorded: October–November 1995
- Studio: Electric Lady (New York City)
- Genre: Punk rock
- Length: 38:04
- Label: Atlantic
- Producers: Ric Ocasek; Bad Religion

Bad Religion chronology
All Ages (1995)	The Gray Race (1996)	Tested (1997)

Singles from The Gray Race
- 1. "A Walk" Released: 1996; 2. "Punk Rock Song" Released: 1996; 3. "The Streets of America" Released: 1996 (EU)

The Gray Race is the ninth full-length album of the punk rock band Bad Religion, which was released in 1996. It was the follow-up to the band's highly successful 1994 album Stranger Than Fiction.

This was the band's first album not recorded with original guitarist Brett Gurewitz (since the 1985 EP Back to the Known) and is their first release with Brian Baker, who replaced him during the Stranger Than Fiction tour.

Some songs on the album are considered fan favorites, such as, "Them And Us", "A Walk", "Punk Rock Song", "Spirit Shine", "Ten in 2010", "Come Join Us", and "Cease".

Although not as successful as Stranger Than Fiction, The Gray Race achieved modest success when MTV ran a commercial for the album during its release. The album was re-released by Epitaph Records on September 15, 2008.

== Production and marketing ==
After the 10-month Stranger Than Fiction tour, frontman Graffin soon began writing songs for Stranger Than Fiction's follow-up. The band recorded it at Electric Lady Studios, New York City with producer Ric Ocasek (of the Cars, Bad Brains and Weezer fame). The recording lasted throughout much of October and November 1995.

== Reception ==
Professional ratings
Review scores
Source	Rating
AllMusic	3/5 stars
Alternative Rock	9/10
Robert Christgau	(1-star Honorable Mention)
Los Angeles Times	2.5/4 stars
NME	1/10
Rolling Stone	3/5 stars
Spin	7/10

The Gray Race was released on February 27, 1996, and peaked at No. 56 on the Billboard 200 album chart. It spawned the moderately successful single "A Walk" in the United States. In Europe, the album also reached the German charts at No. 6 as well as earn the group a gold record for sales in Scandinavia. Then-former and now current guitarist Brett Gurewitz disliked the album, however, and commented that it was "BR's worst-selling record to date" and described it as "uninspired." He has since taken that back. Author Dave Thompson, in his book Alternative Rock (2000), wrote that Baker "not only brings new blood to the band, but also some superior guitar work. Gritty classics, tougher than recent offerings, dance on an edge not visited since the days of Generator."

== Track listing ==
All tracks are written by Greg Graffin, except where noted.

No.	Title	Writer(s)	Length
1.	"The Gray Race"	Graffin, Brian Baker	2:06
2.	"Them and Us"		2:50
3.	"A Walk"		2:14
4.	"Parallel"		3:19
5.	"Punk Rock Song"		2:27
6.	"Empty Causes"		2:51
7.	"Nobody Listens"	Graffin, Baker	1:57
8.	"Pity the Dead"		2:56
9.	"Spirit Shine"	Graffin, Baker	2:11
10.	"The Streets of America"	Graffin, Baker	3:48
11.	"Ten in 2010"		2:22
12.	"Victory"		2:36
13.	"Drunk Sincerity"		2:13
14.	"Come Join Us"		2:03
15.	"Cease"		2:35
Total length:			38:04

European bonus track
No.	Title	Length
16.	"Punk Rock Song" (German language version)	2:27

Japanese bonus tracks
No.	Title	Writer(s)	Length
16.	"The Universal Cynic"		2:18
17.	"The Dodo"	Graffin, Baker	2:12

== Personnel ==
Adapted from the album liner notes.

Bad Religion

- Greg Graffin – lead vocals, backing vocals
- Greg Hetson – guitar
- Brian Baker – guitar, backing vocals
- Jay Bentley – bass, backing vocals
- Bobby Schayer – drums, backing vocals

Technical

- Ric Ocasek – production
- Bad Religion – production
- Bruce Calder – engineer
- Andy Salas – assistant engineer
- George Marino – mastering
- Frank Gargiulo – art direction, design
- STAIN – design
- Ryan J. McGuiness – design assistance
- Richard Burbridge – photography (portraits)
- Frank Ockenfels 3 – photography (band)

== Notes and trivia ==
- Due to Gurewitz's departure a year before the album was recorded, all tracks for this album were written by Greg Graffin, though guitarist Brian Baker co-wrote 4 out of 15 of the songs.
- The track "Cease" was later re-recorded for Greg Graffin's 1997 solo album, American Lesion, this time as a piano and vocal arrangement. This version was played by Graffin on their 2006 DVD Live at the Palladium.
- The album liner contains ten portraits of faces in black and white. Different versions exist, with different pictures as the front cover.
- The album would earn Bad Religion a gold record for sales in Scandinavia and reach # 6 on the German charts for the single "Punk Rock Song".
- The songs "Them and Us" and "Ten in 2010" were featured in the 1999 game Crazy Taxi.
- The album was re-released by Epitaph Records on September 15, 2008.

== Charts ==
=== Weekly charts ===
Weekly chart performance for The Gray Race
Chart (1996)	Peak position
Australian Albums (ARIA)	44
Austrian Albums (Ö3 Austria)	15
Canada Top Albums/CDs (RPM)	41
Dutch Albums (Album Top 100)	61
Finnish Albums (Suomen virallinen lista)	2
German Albums (Offizielle Top 100)	11
Swedish Albums (Sverigetopplistan)	6
Swiss Albums (Schweizer Hitparade)	21
UK Rock & Metal Albums (Official Charts)	16
US Billboard 200	56

=== Year-end charts ===
Year-end chart performance for The Gray Race
Chart (1996)	Position
German Albums (Offizielle Top 100)	60

== Certifications ==
Certifications for The Gray Race
Region	Certification	Certified units/sales
Finland (Musiikkituottajat)	Gold	20,147
