= Marvin Gaye Live! =

Live album by Marvin Gaye
- Released: June 19, 1974
- Recorded: January 4, 1974
- Venues: Oakland Coliseum Arena, Oakland, California
- Genre: Soul
- Length: 43:41
- Label: Tamla
- Producer: Marvin Gaye

Marvin Gaye chronology
Anthology (1974)	Marvin Gaye Live! (1974)	I Want You (1976)

Singles from Marvin Gaye Live!
- 1. "Distant Lover" Released: 28 June 1974

Marvin Gaye Live! is the second live album issued by soul musician Marvin Gaye, released on June 19, 1974, by Tamla Records.

== Overview ==
=== Returning to live performances ===
In 1973, Gaye released his greatest-selling album, Let's Get It On, which made him the biggest-selling Motown artist during his lifetime. Motown Records, Gaye's label for over a decade, had long wanted Gaye to promote his recordings with a national tour but the rebellious singer, who had begun suffering from stage fright after the collapse of his beloved singing duet partner Tammi Terrell in October 1967 and who later died of a brain tumor two and a half years later in March 1970, had refused to return to live performing only agreeing to do it at sporadic times including when he was honored in his hometown in Washington, D.C. in May 1972. performing at the Kennedy Center, and briefly in the 1973 film Save the Children. But with the success of Let's Get It On and Gaye's now-increasing spending habit, he reluctantly agreed to start touring again in the beginning of 1974.

After rescheduling the concert for January 4, 1974, at the Oakland Coliseum Arena, Gaye took the stage in front of 14,000-plus screaming fans. He performed a new song which he dedicated to his girlfriend Janis Hunter titled "Jan", as well as songs from his 1970s repertoire, only including his 1960s classics in a sped-up "Fossil Medley". Throughout his tours, Gaye began developing performance anxiety and had feared the public reception. To test the public, he reportedly forced his younger brother Frankie to come out before being confident enough to come out afterwards. The biggest fan response on the album came when Gaye retooled his song, "Distant Lover", into a slower-paced version. The performance soon became a Gaye trademark onstage and the singer continued to perform the song in that similar style until his final performances in the early 1980s.

=== Reception ===
Commercially, the album was a big success and proved that, despite his fears, Gaye was still as convincing as a live performer as he was as a recording artist during the early-1970s. On August 31, 1974, the album peaked at #1 on the R&B album chart for two weeks while resting at #8 on the pop album chart. The live version of "Distant Lover" created such a frenetic response that Motown issued the live song as a single where it reached #28 on the pop chart and #15 on the R&B charts in the late summer of 1974. The album would go on to sell over a million copies.

The live album earned Gaye his fifth Grammy Award nomination for Best Male R&B Vocal Performance at the 17th Annual Grammy Awards, losing to "Boogie on Reggae Woman" by fellow Motown artist and close friend Stevie Wonder.

Professional ratings
Review scores
Source	Rating
AllMusic	3/5 stars
Christgau's Record Guide	C+
Tom Hull	B

== Track listing ==
=== Original LP ===
Side A

1. "Introduction" – 0:34
2. "Overture" (Marvin Gaye) – 2:24
3. "Trouble Man" (Gaye) – 6:36
4. "Inner City Blues (Make Me Wanna Holler)" (Gaye, James Nyx) – 3:55
5. "Distant Lover" (Gwen Gordy Fuqua, Gaye, Sandra Greene) – 6:14
6. "Jan" (Gaye) – 2:56

Side B

1. Fossil Medley: "I'll Be Doggone"/"Try It Baby"/"Can I Get a Witness"/"You're a Wonderful One"/"Stubborn Kind of Fellow"/"How Sweet It Is (To Be Loved by You)" – 11:36
2. "Let's Get It On" (Gaye, Ed Townsend) – 4:43
3. "What's Going On" (Renaldo Benson, Al Cleveland, Gaye) – 4:49

=== 1998 CD remaster ===
1. "Introduction" – 0:34
2. "Overture" (Gaye) – 2:24
3. "Trouble Man" (Gaye) – 6:36
4. "Flyin' High (In the Friendly Sky)"/"Mercy Mercy Me (The Ecology)" – 4:28
5. "Inner City Blues (Make Me Wanna Holler)" (Gaye, Nyx) – 3:55
6. "Distant Lover" (Gordy Fuqua, Gaye, Greene) – 6:14
7. "Jan" (Gaye) – 2:56
8. "Keep Gettin' It On" (Gaye, Townsend) – 3:07
9. Fossil Medley: "I'll Be Doggone"/"Try It Baby"/"Can I Get a Witness"/"You're a Wonderful One"/"Stubborn Kind of Fellow"/"How Sweet It Is (To Be Loved By You)" – 11:36
10. "Thanks to the Orchestra" – 0:55
11. "Let's Get It On" (Gaye, Townsend) – 4:43
12. "What's Going On" (Benson, Cleveland, Gaye) – 4:49

== See also ==
- List of number-one R&B albums of 1974 (U.S.)
