= Distant Lover =

Song by Marvin Gaye

Single by Marvin Gaye

from the album Let's Get It On
- A-side: "Come Get to This"
- Released: 1973
- Recorded: November 3, 1970 – July 20, 1973
- Studio: Hitsville U.S.A. (Detroit); Hitsville West (Hollywood)
- Genre: Soul; quiet storm; psychedelic soul
- Length: 4:15
- Label: Tamla
- Songwriters: Marvin Gaye, Gwen Gordy Fuqua, Sandra Greene
- Producer: Marvin Gaye

Audio sample
- file; help

"Distant Lover" is the sixth song issued on singer Marvin Gaye's 1973 album, Let's Get It On and the B-side of the second single from that album, "Come Get to This". A live recording was issued as a single in 1974. The live version of the song was Gaye's most successful single during the three-year gap between Let's Get It On and his following 1976 album, I Want You.

== History ==
=== Studio version ===
Marvin composed the melody of the song with songwriter Sandra Greene during a 1970 recording session while Gaye was finishing edits of his song, "What's Going On". Recorded on November 3, 1970, Gaye first recorded a rough version simply titled "Head Title". Later in the same recording sessions, with help from his sister-in-law, Gwen Gordy Fuqua, Gaye composed more lyrics and gave it its title, "Distant Lover". Gaye would rework the song several times during the 1970 recording sessions. In the "Head Title" version, Gaye began singing his lyrics "right off the top of my head" and performed in a rasp-influenced growl. Two mixes of the "Head Title" version was released posthumously on reissues of Gaye's What's Going On album.

The first version, which mixed vocals from another session of the song in what was perceived as a "rough mix", was issued on the 30th anniversary deluxe edition issue of the album in 2001. Ten years later, in 2011, Motown historian Harry Weinger discovered the disregarded "original mix" of the song, which was more polished and featured more lyrics as the other version issued in 2001 had cut off parts of the second chorus' lyrics. This original mix was issued on the 40th anniversary re-issue of the album. In both versions of the "Head Title", Gaye was accompanied by songwriter and confidant Elgie Stover as he ad-libbed a pained speaking vocal, at times screaming in falsetto during Gaye's performance. At the end of both versions, a female voice, later confirmed to be Denise Gordy, Gaye's niece-in-law and mother of his adopted son, Marvin III, could be heard speaking to Marvin.

Gaye eventually recorded the final versions of the song during the Let's Get It On recording sessions, recording several takes. One of the alternate takes was later issued on the deluxe edition re-issue of Let's Get It On and featured the saxophone intro by Eli Fontaine as the "Head Title" versions had done. In the version that was overdubbed for the final track listing of Let's Get It On, the saxophone intro in the beginning was edited out. There also appeared to be sounds of microphone bleed that was reverberated while Gaye was singing and simple drum beats. In the alternate take of "Come Get to This" after the song ends, the voices of Gaye and Denise Gordy taken from the earlier 1970 sessions, could be heard before the beginning of the alternate vocal of "Distant Lover". In the finished version, Gaye sung in both a falsetto and a tenor voice, begging and pleading for his lover to "come back home" in a raspy growl. According to the liner notes of the Deluxe reissue of Let's Get It On, it took twenty separate recording sessions before Marvin was satisfied with the song-more dates than it took to record the entire What's Going On album. Of the studio version, an Allmusic reviewer wrote:

Marvin Gaye's studio recording enhances the dreamy style of the song with stately horn and strings, tumbling drum fills that gently nudge the song along, and mellow, doo wop-styled background vocals that echo "love her, you love her" under his romantic pleas. Gaye fulfills the song's promise with a rich vocal that builds from a heartbroken croon to an impassioned wail. It worked both as romantic mood piece and a showcase for Gaye's considerable vocal skills.

— Allmusic

The original 1973 recording was later sampled by Kanye West on his The College Dropout album in 2004 on the song "Spaceship".

The 1974 live version was later sampled by Travis Scott on his Days Before Rodeo mixtape in 2014 on the song "Backyard".

=== Live version ===
"Distant Lover (live)"

Single by Marvin Gaye

from the album Marvin Gaye Live!
- B-side: "Trouble Man (live)"
- Released: June 28, 1974
- Recorded: January 4, 1974; Oakland Coliseum (Oakland, California)
- Genre: Soul
- Length: 6:20 (album version); 3:45 (single version)
- Label: Tamla
- Songwriters: Marvin Gaye, Gwen Gordy Fuqua, Sandra Greene
- Producer: Marvin Gaye

Marvin Gaye singles chronology
"Stop, Look, Listen (To Your Heart)" (1974)	"Distant Lover (live)" (1974)	"I Want You" (1976)

When Let's Get It On was issued, the song was released as the b-side to Marvin's hit, "Come Get to This". The song was later immortalized in a live version issued on his Marvin Gaye Live! album from 1974 in which Marvin builds up the song from a slowed-up version of his Trouble Man instrumental, "Theme from Trouble Man". After a small introduction, Marvin begins to sing the song, leading female audience members who attended his live show at the Oakland Coliseum to scream in delight. Record World called this live version "this sexiest of slow drags." The song would become a show-stopper in later concerts from then on until Marvin's final concert tour in 1983. Allmusic called it a "steamy version... complete with wailing female fans." The live version of the song was so popular Motown issued that version as a single in June where it peaked at #28 on the pop singles chart and #12 on the R&B singles chart in September 1974.

== Personnel ==
=== 1970 version ("Head Title") ===
- Lead and background vocals by Marvin Gaye
- Spoken vocals by Elgie Stover and Denise Gordy
- Instrumentation by The Funk Brothers and members of the Detroit Symphony Orchestra - strings
- Produced by Marvin Gaye

=== 1973 studio version ===
- Lead and background vocals by Marvin Gaye
- Instrumentation by The Funk Brothers and the Detroit Symphony Orchestra
- Arranged by David Van De Pitte
- Produced by Marvin Gaye

=== 1974 live version ===
- Lead vocals by Marvin Gaye
- Background vocals by Eric Dolen, Charles Burns, Dwight Owens, Michael Torrance & Wally Cox
- Instrumentation:
  - Ed Greene: drums
  - James Jamerson: bass
  - David T. Walker: guitar
  - Ray Parker: guitar
  - Joe Sample: keyboard
  - John Arnold: percussion
  - Joe Clayton: congas
  - Paul Hubinon: trumpet
  - George Bohanon: trombone
  - Ernie Watts: sax
  - William Green: sax
  - James Getzoff: violin
  - Jack Shulman: violin
- Gene Page — conductor
- Produced by Marvin Gaye
