= Recipe for Hate =

Studio album by Bad Religion
- Released: June 4, 1993
- Recorded: 1993
- Studios: Westbeach Recorders, Hollywood, California
- Genres: Melodic hardcore; punk rock
- Length: 37:31
- Labels: Epitaph (original); Atlantic (re-release)
- Producer: Bad Religion

Bad Religion chronology
Generator (1992)	Recipe for Hate (1993)	Stranger Than Fiction (1994)

Singles from Recipe for Hate
- 1. "American Jesus" Released: 1993; 2. "Struck a Nerve" Released: 1993; 3. "Lookin' In" Released: 1993

Recipe for Hate is the seventh studio album by American punk rock band Bad Religion, released on June 4, 1993. It was their last album on Epitaph Records for nine years (until 2002's The Process of Belief) and the band had switched to Atlantic Records, who re-released the album several months after its release.

It was the first Bad Religion album to chart in the U.S., debuting at number 14 on Billboard's Heatseekers chart, with "American Jesus" and "Struck a Nerve" in particular released as singles.

== Production ==
Like Bad Religion's albums up to Generator, Recipe for Hate was recorded at Westbeach Recorders in Hollywood, California, in 1993. This was the last time they would record an album there, until 2002's The Process of Belief.

During the recording of the album, Johnette Napolitano (of Concrete Blonde) and Eddie Vedder (of Pearl Jam) were invited to the studio to provide backing vocals on some of the songs. Napolitano's backing vocals can be heard on "Struck a Nerve", where she provides backing vocals on the bridge and the final chorus. Vedder also provided backing vocals on "American Jesus" and sings the second verse of "Watch It Die".

Final overdubs and mixing were done at Brooklyn Recording Studios in Los Angeles, CA. The car used in "Stealth" was Brett Gurewitz's car, and recorded just outside the studio in the parking lot. One or two songs were remixed at a different studio after the Brooklyn Recording sessions.

== Musical style ==
The album finds Bad Religion continuing the experimentation of its predecessor, Generator, introducing elements of country and folk on songs like "Man with a Mission", and "Struck a Nerve", the latter of which includes a guest vocal by Johnette Napolitano (of Concrete Blonde). "Man with a Mission" featured a slide guitar part over a standard punk guitar "gallop". Drummer Bobby Schayer referred to it as Bad Religion's iteration of Sgt. Pepper's Lonely Hearts Club Band (1967) by the Beatles. Author Dave Thompson, in his book Alternative Rock (2000), wrote that the album "continu[es] to intellectually question America's blind view of itself and the rest of the world."

== Album cover ==
The album cover features an image of two dog-faced humans. It is an original photo collage – using the bodies of 1930s Southern racists mocking the press after their acquittal by an all-white jury for murder, and 1944 Nazi Auschwitz-Birkenau concentration camp guard dog heads. The artwork was designed by Fred Hidalgo (known for drawing the cover for the Offspring's highly acclaimed 1994 album Smash, which was also released on Epitaph). The Recipe for Hate cover also features the Friz Quadrata font, which has also been used by the band Black Flag.

== Release and reception ==
Professional ratings
Review scores
Source	Rating
AllMusic	3.5/5 stars
Alternative Rock	8/10
Chicago Tribune	3/4 stars
Christgau's Consumer Guide	(neither)
Los Angeles Times	3/4 stars
The New Rolling Stone Album Guide	3/5 stars

Recipe for Hate was released on June 4, 1993, and became the last Bad Religion album distributed via Epitaph Records before their return to the label in 2001. Although Recipe for Hate did not chart on the Billboard 200, it peaked at number 14 on Billboard's Heatseekers chart. The singles "American Jesus" and "Struck a Nerve" also did not chart, but earned airplay on MTV. Viewed as their breakthrough album, it would sell close to 200,000 copies. They subsequently signed to major label Atlantic Records, who reissued the album on 6 September 1993. The band was taking up resources at Epitaph Records, much to the disadvantage of the other acts on the label. Thompson wrote that "it is no coincidence that no sooner was the label free to deal with acts other than Bad Religion that both the Offspring and Rancid commenced their own dizzying ascents."

Recipe for Hate received generally mixed to positive reviews from most music critics. AllMusic reviewer Jack Rabid stated: "It's easy to take them for granted, to view Recipe as just another red-hot LP (ho hum) by the last and best band to survive the '80s L.A. punk explosion. And on first listen, it's tarnished by their previous mild malaise: everything sounds alike, and some exit the boat here too quickly. But then the beautiful sonic smack starts to sink in, and the luxurious melodies introduce erudite parables." Thompson thought that the band "wrap themselves in some of their strongest songs ever", adding that it was an "obvious next step on from Generator, a little bit cleaner, a tiny taste brighter, and a major league breakthrough which deserved every plaudit."

Unlike Bad Religion's previous albums (except Into the Unknown), Recipe for Hate has never been remastered, or reissued on CD or cassette since Atlantic re-released the album in 1993. It has, however, been reissued on vinyl twice (in 2009 and 2015), and was included in the 2010 vinyl box set 30 Years of Bad Religion, containing reissues of all the band's albums up to The Dissent of Man.

== Track listing ==
No.	Title	Writer(s)	Length
1.	"Recipe for Hate"	Greg Graffin	2:02
2.	"Kerosene"	Brett Gurewitz	2:41
3.	"American Jesus"	Gurewitz, Graffin	3:17
4.	"Portrait of Authority"	Graffin	2:44
5.	"Man with a Mission"	Gurewitz	3:11
6.	"All Good Soldiers"	Gurewitz	3:06
7.	"Watch it Die (featuring Eddie Vedder of Pearl Jam)"	Graffin	2:34
8.	"Struck a Nerve"	Graffin	3:47
9.	"My Poor Friend Me"	Graffin	2:42
10.	"Lookin' In"	Graffin	2:04
11.	"Don't Pray on Me"	Gurewitz	2:42
12.	"Modern Day Catastrophists"	Graffin	2:46
13.	"Skyscraper" (the song ends at 2:35, followed by 40 seconds of silence)	Gurewitz	3:15
14.	"Stealth" (Hidden track)	Jay Bentley, Gurewitz, Bobby Schayer	0:40
Total length:			37:31

- "Skyscraper" is misspelled as "Sky Skraper" on the CD, but spelled correctly on the back cover and in the booklet.

== Personnel ==
Adapted from the album liner notes, except where noted.

Bad Religion

- Greg Graffin – vocals
- Brett Gurewitz – guitar, backing vocals
- Greg Hetson – guitar
- Jay Bentley – bass guitar, backing vocals
- Bobby Schayer – drums

Additional musicians

- Eddie Vedder – guest vocals on "American Jesus" and "Watch It Die"
- Johnette Napolitano – guest vocals on "Struck a Nerve"
- John Wahl – guitar on "Kerosene"
- Chris Bagarozzi – guitar on "Kerosene"
- Greg Leisz – slide guitar on "Man with a Mission"
- Joe Peccerillo – lead guitar on "All Good Soldiers"

Technical

- Bad Religion – production
- Paul du Gré – engineering, mixing
- Donnell Cameron – additional engineering
- Joe Peccerillo – assistant engineering
- Scott Stillman – assistant engineering
- Doug Sax – mastering
- Frederico Carlo mel Hidalgo – art direction, design
- Alison Dyer – photography

== Charts ==
Chart (1993)	Peak position
Finnish Albums (The Official Finnish Charts)	29
German Albums (Offizielle Top 100)	34
US Heatseekers Albums (Billboard)	14
