= Truth (Guy King album) =

Studio album by Guy King
- Released: February 23, 2016
- Recorded: Los Angeles, Ca
- Genre: Soul, gospel, blues, jazz
- Length: 1:10.55
- Label: Delmark Records
- Producer: Guy King

Truth is the fourth studio album by Israeli-American blues artist Guy King. Released in 2016, the album is a blend of blues, jazz, funk, and soul. King's vocals on the album were heavily influenced by Ray Charles's vocal stylings. Truth reached #1 at the Roots music report -Contemporary Blues Chart, and #5 at the Living Blues Chart.

== Background ==
Truth is an album with a big band sound, that primarily is composed of two genres: jazz and Chicago blues. The album contains, "blues, funk, soul, and everything in between."

== Release and reception ==
Dan Bindert of Chicago Blues Guide said, "...he (Guy King) plays it sophisticated and soulful, with a sense of taste and genuine feeling that's sometimes lacking in contemporary blues. It's easily the Israeli-born guitarist's most fully realized recording yet, with top flight production."

John Mitchell of Blues Blast Magazine opined: "The style is relaxed with more than a touch of jazz in Guy’s playing, at times recalling George Benson in his prime."

== Personnel ==
Guy King Band

- Guy King – Lead guitar, Rhythm guitar, vocals
- Amr Marcin Fahmy - Rhodes B3 Hammond Organ
- Jake Vinsel - bass
- George Fludas - Drums,
- Marques Carroll - Trumpet
- Christopher Neal - Tenor Saxophone
- Brent Griffin Jr - Baritone Saxophone
- Sahrah Marie Young, Kiara Shackelford and Jihan Murray-Smith -Background Vocals
