= A Walk =

Single by Bad Religion

from the album The Gray Race
- Released: 1996
- Recorded: October–November 1995 at Electric Lady Studios, New York City, New York
- Length: 2:14
- Label: Atlantic Records; Murmur (Australia)
- Songwriter: Greg Graffin
- Producer: Ric Ocasek

Bad Religion singles chronology
"Incomplete" (1995)	"A Walk" (1996)	"Punk Rock Song" (1996)

"A Walk" is a song written by American musician Greg Graffin from American punk rock group Bad Religion. It was the first single from their 1996 album, The Gray Race. It was the album's only single to chart in the United States.

== Chart positions ==
Chart (1996)	Peak position
US Alternative Airplay (Billboard)	34
US Mainstream Rock Airplay (Billboard)	38
