= Bobby Schayer =

American punk rock drummer

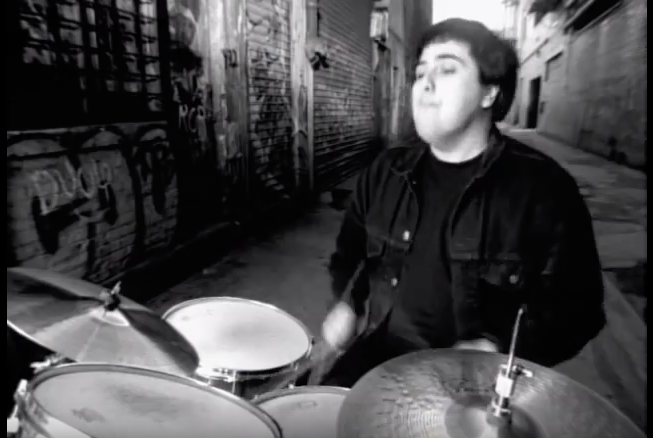
- Bobby performing with Bad Religion

Background information
- Born: Robert Allen Schayer; December 23, 1966 (age 59)
- Origin: United States
- Genres: Punk rock
- Occupation: Musician
- Instrument: Drums
- Years active: 1981–present
- Labels: Atlantic, Epitaph
- Formerly of: Bad Religion (1991-2001)

Bobby Schayer (born December 23, 1966, in Los Angeles, California) is an American drummer. He was a member of Bad Religion from 1991 to 2001. Schayer is from Encino, a suburb in the San Fernando Valley. He started drumming in 1976 at the age of 10, but it was not until 1980 that he became a student of original Circle Jerks drummer Lucky Lehrer.

Schayer has cited Tommy Ramone, Paul Cook, Clem Burke, Mick Tucker, Bun E. Carlos, Charlie Watts, and Keith Moon as some of his earliest drumming influences. He officially joined Bad Religion on April 1, 1991, after previous drummer, Pete Finestone, left the band after their fifth LP, Against the Grain. He was present on their sixth LP, Generator, in 1992. He also played drums on Recipe For Hate (1993), Stranger Than Fiction (1994), The Gray Race (1996), Tested (1997), No Substance (1998), and The New America in 2000. In 2001, he suffered an injury to his shoulder, and deciding to venture in a new direction, left Bad Religion. Schayer was replaced by Brooks Wackerman, formerly of Infectious Grooves and Suicidal Tendencies.

For over ten years from 2001 to 2011, Schayer was the drum tech for Sam Fogarino of the band Interpol.

Schayer currently lives in Los Angeles, CA.
