= Stranger Than Fiction (Bad Religion album) =

Studio album by Bad Religion
- Released: September 6, 1994
- Recorded: April–May 1994
- Studio: Rumbo Recorders, Canoga Park, Los Angeles
- Genre: Punk rock; hardcore punk; melodic hardcore; skate punk; alternative rock
- Length: 38:28; 42:19 (European version)
- Label: Atlantic (original); Epitaph (reissue)
- Producer: Andy Wallace, Bad Religion

Bad Religion chronology
Recipe for Hate (1993)	Stranger Than Fiction (1994)	All Ages (1995)

Singles from Stranger Than Fiction
- 1. "Stranger Than Fiction" Released: August 1994; 2. "21st Century (Digital Boy)" Released: January 1995; 3. "Infected" Released: 1995 (EU)

Stranger Than Fiction is the eighth full-length studio album and major label debut by American punk rock band Bad Religion, released in 1994. It was a major breakthrough for Bad Religion, being certified Gold by the Recording Industry Association of America and becoming the band's first album to chart on the Billboard 200, peaking at 87.

== Release ==
Stranger Than Fiction was their first album released on the major label Atlantic Records (although that label re-released the previous album, Recipe for Hate). In the midst of touring, guitarist Brett Gurewitz left the band, citing personal conflicts in the band and a need to focus on Epitaph Records. Gurewitz's role was filled by Brian Baker, formerly of Minor Threat.

With sales continuing 32 years after its release, Stranger Than Fiction is one of Bad Religion's most successful albums, featuring two of their well-known hit singles, "Infected" (released on January 6, 1995) and the re-recorded version of "21st Century (Digital Boy)" (released September 1994), which first appeared on Against the Grain. Both songs earned airplay on MTV and radio stations, such as KROQ. The album included another hit single, "Stranger Than Fiction" (released August 1994), though the last one, "Incomplete" (released May 1995), failed to make any national chart. The album also includes fan favorites, "Leave Mine To Me", "Tiny Voices", "The Handshake", and "Better Off Dead." As of today, Stranger Than Fiction remains the only Bad Religion record to obtain gold status in the United States and Canada. The album was re-released by Epitaph Records on September 15, 2008.

In 2009, Rhino Records released a colored vinyl to coincide with this album's 15th anniversary.

== Artwork ==
Simon Young of Kerrang! said of the album's cover artwork: "If you’re the most intellectual punk band on the planet, why not use a photo which suggests your singer has just had an epic nap and doesn’t give a shiny shit."

== Reception ==
Professional ratings
Review scores
Source	Rating
AllMusic	2.5/5 stars
Chicago Sun-Times	3.5/4 stars
Chicago Tribune	3.5/4 stars
Entertainment Weekly	A−
Los Angeles Times	3/4 stars
NME	8/10
Q	4/5 stars
Rolling Stone	3.5/5 stars
The Rolling Stone Album Guide	4/5 stars
Spin Alternative Record Guide	7/10

Stranger Than Fiction was released on September 6, 1994, and became the first Bad Religion album distributed via Atlantic Records. On September 24 of that year, the album peaked at number 87 on the Billboard 200 album chart, and on March 4, 1998, also became Bad Religion's first (and only) album to be certified gold in the United States.

AllMusic's Jack Rabid praised this album as a "rare case of selling out in reverse" and songs such as "Leave Mine to Me", "Individual", "Tiny Voices" and "Marked", calling them "all uptempo barnburners, pulverizing in their rapid passion". He also criticizes "'Infected' and 'Television'" as "the two least effective songs of their 15 years, the former a third-rate 'Sanity'", referring to the seventh track on 1989's No Control. Author Dave Thompson, in his book Alternative Rock (2000), wrote that "while Recipe went for poppy, Fiction goes for polish," praising Wallace's production." He added: "Aggression and drama spar at mid-punk pace while the themes remain as acerbic as ever."

In November 2011, Stranger Than Fiction was ranked number one on Guitar World magazine's top ten list of guitar albums of 1994, with The Offspring's Smash in second place and Weezer's Weezer in third place. Loudwire placed Stranger Than Fiction at No. 9 on its "10 Best Hard Rock Albums of 1994" list. In July 2014, Stranger Than Fiction was featured on Guitar World magazine's "Superunknown: 50 Iconic Albums That Defined 1994" list.

== Track listing ==
No.	Title	Writer(s)	Length
1.	"Incomplete (featuring Wayne Kramer)"	Brett Gurewitz	2:28
2.	"Leave Mine to Me"	Greg Graffin	2:07
3.	"Stranger Than Fiction"	Gurewitz	2:20
4.	"Tiny Voices"	Graffin	2:36
5.	"The Handshake"	Graffin	2:50
6.	"Better Off Dead"	Gurewitz	2:39
7.	"Infected"	Gurewitz	4:08
8.	"Television" (featuring Tim Armstrong of Rancid)	Gurewitz, Johnette Napolitano	2:03
9.	"Individual"	Graffin	1:58
10.	"Hooray for Me..."	Gurewitz	2:50
11.	"Slumber"	Graffin	2:39
12.	"Marked" (featuring Jim Lindberg of Pennywise)	Gurewitz	1:48
13.	"Inner Logic"	Graffin	2:58
14.	"What It Is"	Graffin	2:08
15.	"21st Century (Digital Boy)"	Gurewitz	2:47
Total length:			38:28

European and Brazilian bonus tracks
No.	Title	Writer(s)	Length
16.	"News from the Front"	Gurewitz; Jay Bentley; Bobby Schayer	2:22
17.	"Markovian Process"	Graffin	1:29
Total length:			42:19

Japanese bonus tracks
No.	Title	Writer(s)	Length
16.	"News from the Front"	Gurewitz; Bentley; Schayer	2:22
17.	"Markovian Process"	Graffin	1:29
18.	"Leaders and Followers"	Graffin	2:40
Total length:			44:59

== B-sides ==
- "Markovian Process" (Graffin) – 1:29
- "Leaders and Followers" (Graffin) – 2:40
- "Mediocrity" (Graffin) – 2:45
- "News from the Front" (Gurewitz, Bentley, Schayer) – 2:22

== Personnel ==
Adapted from the album liner notes.

Bad Religion

- Greg Graffin – lead vocals, backing vocals
- Greg Hetson – guitar
- Brett Gurewitz – guitar, backing vocals
- Jay Bentley – bass guitar, backing vocals
- Bobby Schayer – drums

Additional musicians

- Wayne Kramer – lead guitar on "Incomplete"
- Andy Wallace – Hammond organ on "Stranger Than Fiction"
- Tim Armstrong – guest vocals on "Television"
- Jim Lindberg – guest vocals on "Marked"

Technical

- Andy Wallace – production, mixing
- Bad Religion – production
- Dick Kaneshiro – assistant engineer
- Milton Chan – mixing assistant engineer
- Dan Winters – photography
- Jean Cronin – art coordination
- Norman Moore – design, art direction

== Charts ==
=== Weekly charts ===
Chart (1994–1995)	Peak position
Australian Albums (ARIA)	117
Austrian Albums (Ö3 Austria)	27
Finnish Albums (The Official Finnish Charts)	6
German Albums (Offizielle Top 100)	6
Swedish Albums (Sverigetopplistan)	6
Swiss Albums (Schweizer Hitparade)	28
UK Rock & Metal Albums (OCC)	39
US Billboard 200	87

=== Year-end charts ===
Chart (1994)	Position
German Albums (Offizielle Top 100)	75

== Certifications ==
Region	Certification	Certified units/sales
Canada (Music Canada)	Gold	50,000^{^}
Sweden (GLF)	Gold	50,000^{^}
United States (RIAA)	Gold	500,000^{^}
^{^} Shipments figures based on certification alone.
