= Field Day (Dag Nasty album) =

Studio album by Dag Nasty
- Released: February 1988
- Recorded: November 1987
- Genre: Melodic hardcore, emo
- Length: 33:54 (original); 43:50 (reissue)
- Label: Giant

Dag Nasty chronology
Wig Out at Denko's (1987)	Field Day (1988)	Four on the Floor (1992)

Professional ratings
Review scores
Source	Rating
AllMusic	4/5 stars
Robert Christgau	A−

Field Day is the third studio album by American hardcore punk band Dag Nasty, released in 1988 by Giant Records. In Europe, it was released by We Bite Records. It is the band's final album featuring Peter Cortner on lead vocals.

The album features a cover of The Ruts classic "Staring at the Rude Boys." It also offers a new recording of Dag Nasty's "Under Your Influence." The original version appears on the band's debut LP Can I Say with vocalist Dave Smalley.

The CD bonus track "12XU" was written by Wire, and was also covered by Brian Baker's former band Minor Threat.

The album had sold more than 30,000 copies within a year of its release.

== Track listing ==
1. "Trouble Is" - 3:33
2. "Field Day" - 2:28
3. "Things That Make No Sense" - 2:44
4. "The Ambulance Song" - 3:38
5. "Staring at the Rude Boys" - 2:49
6. "13 Seconds Underwater" - 0:46
7. "La Penita" - 4:09
8. "Dear Mrs. Touma" - 2:37
9. "Matt" - 1:34
10. "I've Heard" - 0:12
11. "Under Your Influence" - 3:37
12. "Typical" - 2:37
13. "Here's to You" - 2:49
14. "16 Count" - 0:21

=== CD bonus tracks ===
15. "Never Green Lane" - 1:55
16. "You're Mine" - 3:52
17. "All Ages Show" - 2:38
18. "12XU" - 1:31
- Tracks 16 & 17 originally from the All Ages Show 7-inch EP.
- Tracks 15 & 18 originally from the Trouble Is 12-inch EP.

== Personnel ==
Dag Nasty

  - Peter Cortner - vocals
  - Brian Baker - guitars
  - Doug Carrion - bass
  - Scott Garrett - drums
