= Sharon Cheslow =

American singer-songwriter and artist (born 1961)

Sharon Ann Cheslow (born October 5, 1961) is an American musician, composer, artist, writer, photographer, educator, and archivist. In 1981, she formed Chalk Circle, Washington, D.C.'s first all-female punk band. She has since become an accomplished artist who works between different mediums, mostly sound-based.

== Biography ==
Cheslow was born in Los Angeles, California. She has a B.A. in Intermedia Arts from Mills College, attended graduate school in Music at California Institute of the Arts, and completed a Master of Library and Information Science degree from San José State University. She has worked or taught at Mills College's Olin Library, Stanford University, Bay Area Video Coalition, University of California, Berkeley, University of California, Santa Cruz, and California Institute of the Arts. As a pioneer on many levels, she has collaborated with numerous musicians and artists. Her work crosses boundaries and addresses subject/object relationships.

=== Early years ===
Born in Los Angeles, Sharon Cheslow grew up in the Jewish area near Wilshire and Fairfax in a Reconstructionist Jewish family. In an introduction to an interview with her mother for Interrobang?! Anthology on Music and Family, Cheslow wrote that her maternal great-grandmother emigrated from Kolomea (in present-day Ukraine) and had a professional violinist father. Cheslow's mother graduated from UCLA, became a teacher, and was an American civil rights movement advocate. Her family moved to the Washington, D.C. suburbs in 1967 after Cheslow's father, a Caltech graduate, got a job with the U.S. Department of Transportation. They first moved to Silver Spring, MD and then to Bethesda, MD where she experienced antisemitism. Cheslow listened to rock and roll and was influenced by her parents' love of music, especially folk protest music – one of Cheslow's earliest memories is of listening to her parents' Bob Dylan records. As a young child, Cheslow started singing and playing guitar, as well as taking photographs.

=== D.C. bands and publications ===
Cheslow was influenced by the Beatles, Yoko Ono, Patti Smith, The Slits, Teenage Jesus and the Jerks, and jazz. Her first band Chalk Circle, as guitarist, grew out of her friendships with Anne Bonafede, Henry Garfield (later Henry Rollins), and members of the Teen Idles and Untouchables around late 1979/early 1980. They shared a love of Bad Brains and California punk. When the D.C. hardcore scene became more macho and male-dominated, Chalk Circle didn't fit in and were put down for being all girls. But they got support from art punk bands such as Half Japanese and Velvet Monkeys. Cheslow attended University of Maryland and first learned about feminist theory through film studies classes with Robert Kolker. These experiences led Cheslow to examine and write about the role of women in music.

Cheslow stated, "My main goal was to write about music from a female perspective, and that included writing about the fact that female musicians weren't taken seriously." Her first fanzine was If This Goes On, co-published with Colin Sears from 1982–83, before joining Sears' band Bloody Mannequin Orchestra (BMO). BMO combined hardcore punk with noise rock, no wave, and improvisation, and their recordings came out on WGNS. If This Goes On featured an early Minor Threat interview. It also featured an interview with The Raincoats. Along with doing bands and zines, Cheslow had a radio show on freeform station WMUC-FM.

With Cynthia Connolly and Leslie Clague, she compiled the seminal photographic punk oral history book Banned In DC: Photos and Anecdotes from the DC Punk Underground (79-85) in 1988, which documented the early 1980s Washington, DC hardcore punk scene. The book included flyers from Cheslow's punk flyer collection and some of her photographs, as well as photographs and flyers from Connolly, Clague, and others such as Lucian Perkins and Glen E. Friedman. Cheslow's first issue of Interrobang?! was published in 1989 with a Nation of Ulysses interview. Cheslow was also in a one-off project with Fugazi's Joe Lally.

A retrospective Chalk Circle release, "Reflection", came out in 2011 on Mississippi Records and Post Present Medium.

=== California years ===
==== Bands ====
Cheslow moved to San Francisco in 1990, continued to collaborate with musicians in D.C., and was an influence on Bikini Kill and Bratmobile. In the 1990s she was in indie rock bands Suture (with Dug E. Bird of Beefeater and Kathleen Hanna), Red Eye (with Tim Green of Nation of Ulysses), and The Electrolettes (with Julianna Bright, later of The Quails). Her recordings came out on Dischord Records, Kill Rock Stars, and her label Decomposition. She played guitar and bass and was a singer and songwriter for all three bands, although Hanna was the main vocalist and lyricist for Suture. Suture performed at the International Pop Underground Convention in Olympia, Washington in August 1991.

==== Publications ====
Cheslow's experiences with riot grrrl, while in Suture during 1991–92, inspired her to compile a list of women involved in punk that recorded from 1975 to 1980. For an Experience Music Project Riot Grrrl Retrospective oral history interview in 1999 she said, "There's this whole history out there...And it's not just punk music. It's in rock 'n' roll, it's in jazz, it's in blues, it's in experimental and avant-garde classical music; in every one of these genres, women's history is lost. Women are seen as an 'other.' In the mid-1990s, Cheslow published her comprehensive list of these late 1970s punk women in Interrobang?!, and it became available as an online list. The list was also influenced by Lenny Kaye's compilation LP Nuggets: Original Artyfacts from the First Psychedelic Era, 1965–1968, Judy Chicago's art installation The Dinner Party, and Lucy Lippard's book Six years: the dematerialization of the art object from 1966 to 1972.

Interrobang?! #2, published in 1994, also featured an interview with Cork Marcheschi of Fifty Foot Hose. In 2000 Cheslow edited an anthology on music and transcendence as Interrobang?! #4 which featured writings contributed by Pauline Oliveros, Maggi Payne, Nicole Panter, Public Works, Niko Wenner (of Oxbow), Marc Kate (of I Am Spoonbender), Allison Wolfe, and others. Cheslow edited and published the book Interrobang?! Anthology on Music and Family in 2008, with contributions by Cynthia Connolly, Pauline Oliveros, Ian MacKaye, Alan Licht, Jean Smith, Anna Oxygen, Bill Berkson, Kevin Mattson, Liz Allbee, Matthew Wascovich, Erika Anderson, Janet Sarbanes, and Sara Wintz.

She is a contributor to Thurston Moore's book Mix Tape: The Art of Cassette Culture.

==== Coterie Exchange and other collaborations ====
While studying intermedia arts at Mills College in the music department, Cheslow began performing and exhibiting experimental music, sound art, and installations. In 2000, she participated in the first Ladyfest in Olympia with her composition Geodessy for Guitars (for Yasunao Tone), collaborating with sisters Wendy Yao and Amy Yao from Emily's Sassy Lime in the experimental sound installation performance art Coterie Exchange project, during an art exhibit curated by Audrey Marrs. Cheslow's sound collages and explorations are documented on the CD, Lullabye from the Sky, released in 2002 on Decomposition under the name Sharon Cheslow and Coterie Exchange. It featured collaborations with Tim Green, Julianna Bright and members of Deerhoof among others. The project was the audio component from sound installations she had been performing. In 2003 Fan Music: Winds of Change was featured at Lincoln Center Out of Doors. Her videos to the tracks Dream/Construct and September Son are on two Kill Rock Stars video compilations. In 2004 she toured and collaborated with Yellow Swans, Inca Ore, and Chuck Bettis.

Cheslow moved back to Los Angeles in 2005. Since then she has collaborated with Weasel Walter, Liz Allbee, Neil Young (Fat Worm of Error), Christina Carter (Charalambides), and Elisa Ambrogio (Magik Markers). In L.A. her collaborators have included David Scott Stone, Anna Oxygen, Steve Kim (Silver Daggers), and Julia Holter. She performs with guitar, electronics, organ, digital audio, objects, and vocals.

In 2006 and 2007 she presented the Coterie Exchange sound event Sonic Triptych in California and New York. Multiple, random sets of three performers were instructed to represent themselves through sound in order to facilitate participatory, collaborative action. The New York version was a collaboration with filmmaker/video artist James Schneider (who directed Blue is Beautiful). Sonic Triptych first premiered in San Francisco in 2002 with nine women, including Blevin Blectum and members of Erase Errata. A video of Duct Tape Piece, a collaboration with Alyssa Lee, was exhibited in Europe through Chicks on Speed in 2007 and 2008.

== Videography ==
- Dream/Construct on Video Fanzine #2 (NTSC VHS, Kill Rock Stars, 3 October 2000, KRS300)
- While the City Sleeps and September Son on Sharon Cheslow Video Shorts (DVD, Decomposition, 2004, DE08)
- September Son on Video Fanzine #3 (NTSC DVD, Kill Rock Stars, 12 July 2005, KRS400)

== Discography ==
=== Albums and compilation appearances ===
Chalk Circle

- Mixed Nuts Don't Crack compilation LP (1982)
- Time Clock = Hole in Head compilation cassette (1983)
- We Gots No Station compilation cassette (1984)
- Reflection LP (2011)

Bloody Mannequin Orchestra

- Time Clock = Hole in Head compilation cassette (1983)
- We Gots No Station compilation cassette (1984)
- Roadmap to Revolution LP (1984)
- Streetlights in the Dark cassette (1985)

Suture

- A Wonderful Treat compilation cassette (1991)

Red Eye

- Static Storm cassette (1998)

Electroletes

- Plug Me In cassette (1998)

Solo, Coterie Exchange, Collaborations

- Lullabye from the Sky CD (2002) with Coterie Exchange
- If the Twenty-First Century Didn't Exist CD compilation (2002) with Sharon Cheslow
- Uncertainty Rides the Waves CD (2004) with Coterie Exchange, KIT
- Collaborations CD (2005) with Yellow Swans, Inca Ore, Chuck Bettis, Jerry Lim, Kris Thompson
- Macro-Eden LP compilation (2006) Sharon Cheslow
- Less Self is More Self CD compilation (2006) with Trebville Exchange
- Plants That Kill CD (2007) with Liz Allbee, Weasel Walter

=== Singles and EPs ===
- "Pretty Is" 7-inch EP (1992) with Suture
- "Special Delivery to My Heart" 7-inch single (1995) with Red Eye
- "Octane Lies" 7-inch single (1999) with Electroletes
