= Suture (band) =

American punk rock and indie rock trio

- Origin: Washington, D.C.
- Genres: Punk rock, indie rock
- Years active: 1991–1992
- Labels: Decomposition, Dischord
- Past members: Kathleen Hanna; Sharon Cheslow; Dug E. Bird

Suture was an American punk rock and indie rock trio based in Washington, D.C., affiliated with early riot grrrl. Suture consisted of Kathleen Hanna (electric bass guitar, drums, vocals), Sharon Cheslow (electric guitar, electric bass guitar, vocals), and Dug E. Bird aka Doug Birdzell (electric guitar, drums).

== History ==
Suture formed in summer 1991 while Hanna was in Washington, D.C., with her band Bikini Kill, and Kathi Wilcox was on vacation in Europe. Hanna was previously in Viva Knievel in Olympia, Washington. Cheslow had been in D.C. bands Chalk Circle and Bloody Mannequin Orchestra, while Birdzell had been in D.C. bands Beefeater and Fidelity Jones. Cheslow had moved to San Francisco in 1990 where she'd met Hanna during Bikini Kill's spring 1991 tour with Nation of Ulysses, and while Cheslow and Hanna were both living in D.C. during summer 1991 they collaborated with Birdzell. Jennifer Ballard and Molly Neuman of Bratmobile also played briefly in Suture. The group rehearsed at the Embassy House in Washington, D.C., where Nation of Ulysses lived.

Hanna, Cheslow, and Birdzell performed as Suture on "Girl Night" at the International Pop Underground Convention in Olympia in August 1991. While there, they released the compilation cassette A Wonderful Treat, which included two other Bikini Kill side projects (Spray Painted Love and Wondertwins) and Bratmobile as a duo of Neuman and Allison Wolfe. Cheslow later said, "That summer felt like an amazing confluence of people, ideas, energy, support and enthusiasm."

Evelyn McDonnell and Elisabeth Vincentelli, writing for the New York Times in 2019, considered Suture's "Pretty Is" from their first and only single essential listening of the riot grrrl era, describing it as a "slow dose of melancholia". The song was released on Suture's 1992 7-inch EP on Dischord Records and Cheslow's label Decomposition. The EP was recorded at WGNS studios in Arlington, Virginia. "Pretty Is" had previously been released on A Wonderful Treat.

== Discography ==
=== EPs ===
- Suture! (1992) 7-inch EP (Dischord Records 76½/Decomposition 1): "Good Girl," "Falling," "Pretty Is"

=== Compilations ===
- A Wonderful Treat (1991) compilation cassette: including Suture songs "Good Girl," "Falling," "Secret Language," "Pretty Is"
