= Wig Out at Denko's =

Wig Out At Denkos

Studio album by Dag Nasty
- Released: July 1987
- Recorded: March 1987
- Genre: Melodic hardcore, emo
- Length: 28:05 (original); 42:23 (reissue)
- Label: Dischord
- Producer: Ian MacKaye, Don Zientara

Dag Nasty chronology
Can I Say (1986)	Wig Out At Denkos (1987)	Field Day (1988)

Professional ratings
Review scores
Source	Rating
AllMusic	4/5 stars

Wig Out At Denko's is the second studio album by the American melodic hardcore band Dag Nasty, released in 1987 on Dischord Records. It is the first album to feature vocalist Peter Cortner, who replaced previous vocalist Dave Smalley.

It was remastered and re-released on CD with bonus tracks in 2002.

== Track listing ==
Side one

1. "The Godfather" - 3:21
2. "Trying" - 1:59
3. "Safe" - 3:07
4. "Fall" - 2:53
5. "When I Move" - 1:53

Side two

1. "Simple Minds" - 2:01
2. "Wig Out at Denkos" - 3:15
3. "Exercise" - 3:35
4. "Dag Nasty" - 3:15
5. "Crucial Three" - 2:46

=== 2002 CD reissue bonus tracks ===
11. "Safe (Alternate Version)" - 3:14
12. "Trying (Alternate Version)" - 1:48
13. "Fall (Alternate Version)" - 2:52
14. "Roger (Alternate Version)" - 1:12
15. "Mango (Alternate Version)" - 2:19
16. "When I Move (Live Acoustic Version)" - 2:00
17. "I've Heard (Live Acoustic Version)" - 0:52

== Personnel ==
Dag Nasty

  - Peter Cortner - vocals
  - Brian Baker - guitars
  - Doug Carrion - bass
  - Colin Sears - drums
- Ian MacKaye - producer
- Don Zientara - producer
