= Four on the Floor (Dag Nasty album) =

Studio album by Dag Nasty
- Released: February 24, 1992
- Recorded: 1991
- Genres: Melodic hardcore, pop-punk
- Length: 28:21
- Label: Epitaph
- Producer: Brett Gurewitz

Dag Nasty chronology
Field Day (1988)	Four on the Floor (1992)	Minority of One (2002)

Four on the Floor is the fourth studio album by American hardcore punk band Dag Nasty, released in 1992 through Epitaph Records. The album marked the return of vocalist Dave Smalley, and the return of the lineup featured on their debut album Can I Say.

Four on the Floor was recorded while the band members were on vacation in Los Angeles in the summer of 1991. Guitar tracks are credited to "Dale Nixon," not Brian Baker; Baker could not use his real name because he was at the time under contract with the blues/metal band Junkyard.

== Critical reception ==
Professional ratings
Review scores
Source	Rating
AllMusic	2.5/5 stars

The Washington Post called it a "first-rate" album, writing that the "sound is as punchy and the lyrics as smart as ever; muscular yet melodic, such songs as 'Still Waiting' and 'S.F.S.' manage to be both urgent and infectious."

== Track listing ==
1. "Still Waiting" - 2:52
2. "Going Down" - 2:24
3. "Turn It Down" - 3:25
4. "Million Days" - 3:37
5. "Roger" - 1:20
6. "S.F.S." - 2:51
7. "We Went Wrong" - 3:22
8. "Down Time" - 2:51
9. "Lie Down and Die" - 2:27
10. "Mango" - 3:12

== Personnel ==
- Dave Smalley – Vocals
- Dale Nixon – Guitars
- Roger Marbury – Bass
- Colin Sears – Drums
