= The Last (band) =

American band

- Origin: Los Angeles, California, U.S.
- Genres: Surf rock, proto-punk, psychedelia, folk rock
- Years active: 1976–mid-1980s, 1988–1990, 1994–present
- Labels: Bomp!, SST, End Sounds
- Members: Joe Nolte; James Nolte; Mike Nolte; Philo Van Duyne; Lisa Torres; Paul Rucker
- Past members: David Nolte; Dave Harbison; Danny Winter; Sean Doherty; Mike Clarke; Vitus Mataré; Jack Reynolds; Luke Lohnes; Missy Buettner; Robbie Rist; John Frank; Dave Nazworthy; Larry P. Manke; Ed Urlik; Steve Andrews; John Rosewall; Karl Alvarez; Bill Stevenson; Greg Tarpley; Tony Rugolo

The Last is a Los Angeles–based band formed in 1976 by Joe Nolte with high school bandmates Vitus Mataré and Dave Harbison. By 1978 the band included three brothers: Joe (guitar, vocals), Mike (vocals), and David Nolte (bass guitar). They released several albums on SST Records, Bomp! Records and End Sounds.

== History ==
The band was initially inspired by the nascent CBGB's scene as well as the first Modern Lovers album. Its sound was a mix of garage rock, surf rock, folk rock and psychedelic rock. The first settled line-up included Vitus Mataré (keyboards, flute), the Nolte brothers, and Jack Reynolds (drums). After three self-financed singles, the band was signed by Bomp! Records, who issued the debut album L.A. Explosion! in 1979 (described by Trouser Press as "a near-perfect debut"). It was also issued in Germany (Line Records), Japan Trio/Trash Records), and the UK by London Records.

They recorded a second album, Look Again (1980), which was not released until 2020. The original members began to disappear until its demise in November 1985, with David Nolte joining Wednesday Week and later Lucky, and Mataré forming Trotsky Icepick. The band was considered a major influence on the psychedelia-influenced LA bands of the mid-1980s, including the Bangles and the Three O'Clock, as well as the South Bay punk bands such as Black Flag and the Descendents.

Joe reformed the band in 1988 with Mike Nolte along with new members Luke Lohnes (guitar, vocals), Larry P. Manke (bass guitar), and Dave Nazworthy (of Chemical People) (drums). This line-up signed to SST Records, releasing three albums between 1988 and 1996. The early 1980s lineup of the band reunited for occasional reunion shows in Southern California between 2005 and 2013. That year, the Last released a new album for the label End Sounds featuring the Descendents/All rhythm section of Karl Alvarez and Bill Stevenson.

The Last remains active as of 2020. The current lineup was stabilized in 2019, and consists of:
Joe Nolte: guitar, vocals
James Nolte: keyboard, vocals
Philo Van Duyne: guitar
Lisa Torres: bass
Paul Rucker: drums

James Nolte is former bassist David Nolte's son and Joe's nephew.

David Nolte has worked as a touring bassist, working with Dave Davies of the Kinks, David Gray, the Wondermints and many others. Vitus Mataré went on to become a successful architect and record producer.

As of 2020, the Last planned to release the remixed and remastered version of Look Again, recorded in 1980. According to Amplify Music Magazine,

In 1980, THE LAST recorded the album on their own to control the process as much as possible, but what they came out of the studio with was completely sonically wrong, receiving zero offers from record companies (interestingly, the original copy of the album has been going for over $800 on Discogs). So how exactly did THE LAST bring LOOK AGAIN back to life? As Vitus Mataré explains: “Those same master tapes have been carefully baked and transferred by John Strother at Penguin Recording in Los Angeles. Jonny Bell at Jazzcats Studio in Long Beach worked with the damaged files to restore the signals and performances that Joe and I knew were somewhere on those reels. There are no new overdubs and zero digital trickery. Guitar and organ tracks were sent to the same model amplifiers Joe and I used live back in the day and re-recorded. These are the original performances given a proper mix.

== Discography ==
=== Albums ===
- L.A. Explosion! (Bomp!) (1979)
- Painting Smiles on a Dead Man (Lolita/Backlash) (1985)
- Confession (SST) (1988)
- Awakening (SST) (1989)
- Gin & Innuendoes (SST) (1996)
- Danger (End Sounds) (2013)
- Look Again (House Arrest/Backlash) (recorded 1980, remixed and remastered, released November 2020)

=== Singles ===
- "She Don't Know Why I'm Here" / "Bombing Of London" (Backlash) (1977)
- "Every Summer Day" / "Hitler's Brother" (Backlash) (1978)
- "L.A. Explosion" / "Hitler's Brother" (Backlash) (1978)
- "Every Summer Day" / "Slavedriver" (Bomp!) (1979)
- "This Kind of Feeling" / "Slavedriver", "We're In Control" 12" 45 (Line) (1979)
- "Up in the Air" / "Wrong Turn", "Leper Colony" WarfRat Grammophon (October 1982)
- Fade to Black 12" 45 EP (Bomp!) (1982)

=== Compilation appearances ===
- Waves Vol. 1 (Line) (1979) – "We're In Control"
- Who Put The Bomp? 2XLP (London/Bomp!)
- Yesterday's Sound Today (Line) (1979) – "That Kind Of Feeling", "She Don't Know I'm Here"
- Experiments In Destiny (Bomp!) (1980) – "She Don't Know I'm Here"
- WarfRat Tales (WarfRat Grammophon) (1983) – "Try To Rise", "Brand New Day"
- The Radio Tokyo Tapes (Ear Movie) (1983) – "It Had To Be You"
- The Rebel Kind (Sounds Interesting) (1983) – "What Is In There?"
- The Best Of Louie, Louie (Rhino) (1983) – "Louie, Louie"
- Testube Cassettezine B Vol. 4 #3 cass. (Testube) (1983) – "Try To Rise"
- The Best Of The Tokyo Radio Tapes (Chameleon) (1987) – "It Had To Be You"
- Duck And Cover (SST) (1990) – "Baby It's You"
- SST Acoustic (SST) (1991) – "Awakening"
- That's Line 6 (Line) (1991) – "She Don't Know Why I'm Here"
- We're Desperate: The L.A. Scene (1976-79) (1993) (Rhino) – "She Don't Know Why I'm Here"
- Destination Bomp! (Bomp!) (1994) – "She Don't Know Why I'm Here"
- The Roots Of Powerpop! (Bomp!) (1996) – "Every Summer Day" [as Last]
- Listen And Learn With Vibro-Phonic (Vibro-Phonic) (1994) – "Every Summer Day"
- Joe's Blue Plate Special Wol. 14 & 15: Olivia Tremor Control/Chuck D (Joe's Grille) (2000) – "Perfect World"
- Of Hands And Hearts: Music For The Tsunami Disaster Fund 2XCD (Integrity) (2005) – "I Know (demo)"
- Children Of Nuggets-Original Artyfacts From The Second Psychedelic Era 1976-1996 4XCD box (Rhino) (2005) – "She Don't Know Why I'm Here (Single Version)
- He Put The Bomp! In The Bomp (Vivid Sound/Bomp!) (2007) – "Pablo Picasso"
