= Charlottesville, Iowa =

Former post office and town in Jackson Township

The site of Charlottesville was in the northeast quarter of the southeast quarter of section 24 in Jackson Township.

Charlottesville was a former post office and town in Jackson Township, Madison County, Iowa, operating from 1858 until 1861.

== History ==
Charlottesville (also stylized Charlottsville or Charlott'sville) was first opened in 1858, the first and only postmaster was Albert G. Welch, who is said to have named the post office after his wife, Charlotte. By 1860, the population recorded by the census was 240 in 45 households. The post office closed in October 1861. In an 1875 map of Jackson Township (pictured), the area where Charlottesville existed shows a single schoolhouse.
