= Blue (Down by Law album) =

Studio album by Down by Law

Studio album by Down by Law
- Released: September 25, 1992
- Recorded: 1992
- Studio: Westbeach Recorders, Culver City, California
- Genre: Melodic hardcore
- Length: 40:53
- Label: Epitaph
- Producer: Brett Gurewitz, Donnell Cameron

Down by Law chronology
Down by Law (1991)	Blue (1992)	Punkrockacademyfightsong (1994)

Blue (stylized as blue) is the second studio album by American punk rock band Down by Law. It was released on September 25, 1992, by Epitaph Records on compact disc, compact cassette and phonograph record. The release was their second to be recorded at Westbeach Recorders studio in Culver City, California and produced by Epitaph Records owner Brett Gurewitz; co-produced by Donnell Cameron.

The album's artwork was designed by vocalist and rhythm guitarist David Smalley's wife, Caroline Murphy Smalley, in collaboration with Epitaph Records' contract art director Joy Aoki and illustrator Michael Koelsch. Blue was Down by Law's final release to feature the band's original line-up, as drummer David Nazworthy, lead guitarist Christopher Bagarozzi and bass guitarist Edward Urlik left immediately after the completion of its promotional tour.

== Track listing ==
Songwriting credits are adapted from the album's liner notes.

No.	Title	Lyrics	Music	Length
1.	"The Last Brigade"	Smalley; Nazworthy	Smalley; Nazworthy	3:12
2.	"Looking for Something"	Smalley	Smalley	3:30
3.	"Break the Walls"	Smalley	Smalley	3:42
4.	"At Home in the Wasteland"	Smalley	Smalley	2:41
5.	"Rain"	Smalley	Smalley	5:02
6.	"Turn Away"	Nazworthy	Nazworthy	3:07
7.	"Air Conditioner"	Smalley; Nazworthy	Smalley; Nazworthy	3:31
8.	"The Greenest Field"	Smalley	Smalley	3:10
9.	"Straw"	Smalley	Smalley	3:52
10.	"Finally Here"	Urlik	Urlik	2:18
11.	"Our Own Way"	Smalley; Nazworthy	Smalley; Nazworthy	3:24
12.	"Dead End"	Smalley	Smalley	3:18
Total length:				40:53

== Personnel ==
Credits are adapted from the album's liner notes.

Down by Law

- David Smalley - Vocals, rhythm guitar
- David Nazworthy - Drums; vocals on "Turn Away"
- Edward Urlik - Bass guitar; vocals on "Finally Here"
- Christopher Bagarozzi - Lead guitar

Production and design

- Brett Gurewitz - Producer
- Donnell Cameron - Producer, engineer
- Joe Peccerillo - Engineer
- Joy Aoki - Artwork
- Michael Koelsch - Artwork
- Caroline Murphy Smalley - Design, photography
