= Minority of One =

Studio album by Dag Nasty
- Released: August 13, 2002
- Recorded: January 2002
- Genre: Melodic hardcore
- Length: 35:02
- Label: Revelation

Dag Nasty chronology
Four on the Floor (1992)	Minority of One (2002)

Professional ratings
Review scores
Source	Rating
AllMusic	4/5 stars
Drowned in Sound	7/10
Pitchfork	5.1/10

Minority of One is the fifth studio album by the band Dag Nasty, released in 2002. It was recorded at Inner Ear studios in January 2002. The band had broken up in 1988 but reunited to record Minority of One.

== Track listing ==
1. "Ghosts" - 2:49
2. "Minority of One" - 2:18
3. "Bottle This" - 3:52
4. "Broken Days" - 3:54
5. "Your Words" - 2:02
6. "Incinerate" - 1:57
7. "Throwing Darts" - 2:01
8. "White Flag" - 3:29
9. "Twisted Again" - 2:41
10. "Average Man" - 3:22
11. "Wasting Away" - 3:26
12. "100 Punks" [Hidden Track] - 3:21

== Personnel ==
- Dag Nasty
  - Dave Smalley - Vocals
  - Brian Baker - Guitars
  - Roger Marbury - Bass
  - Colin Sears - Drums
- Steve Hansgen - Producer
- Don Zientara- Producer
