= Take It Back (disambiguation) =

"Take It Back" is a 1994 song by Pink Floyd.

Take It Back may also refer to:

- "Take It Back" (Cream song), 1967
- "Take It Back" (The J. Geils Band song), 1978
- "Take It Back" (Reba McEntire song), 1992
- "Take It Back" (Snot song), 2000
- "Take It Back" (Toddla T song), 2011
- "Take it Back", a track from Bug Hunter's 2020 album Bigger Than Myself
- "Take it Back", a track from Ed Sheeran's deluxe edition of X
- "Take it Back", a track from Logic's 2017 album Everybody
- Food for Thought/Take It Back, a compilation album by Gray Matter

== See also ==
- Take It Back, Take It On, Take It Over!, a 2005 album by 7 Seconds
