= Down by Law (Down by Law album) =

Studio album by Down by Law
- Released: 1991
- Recorded: 1991
- Genre: Melodic hardcore
- Length: 34:49
- Label: Epitaph

Down by Law chronology
Down by Law (1991)	Blue (1992)

Down by Law is the debut album of the band Down by Law. Dave Smalley wrote words and music for all tracks except "The Truth" (words and music by Dave Nazworthy), "Surf Punk" (music by Ed Urlik), "The One" (words by Dave S. and Caroline M.), and "Best Friends" (words and music by The Outlets).

== Track listing ==
All tracks by Dave Smalley

1. "Right Or Wrong" – 2:16
2. "Vision" – 2:44
3. "Dreams Away" – 3:59
4. "Down The Drain" – 2:37
5. "American Dream" – 2:37
6. "The Truth" (Dave Nazworthy) – 1:35
7. "Best Friends" (Outlets) – 3:13
8. "Mat Gleason Is God" – 4:37
9. "The One" (Caroline Murphy, Smalley) – 3:13
10. "Can't See It Still" – 1:42
11. "Surf Punk" (Ed Urlik) – 2:06
12. "Too Much Grey" – 4:10

== Personnel ==
- Dave Smalley – vocals, guitar
- Dave Naz – drums (vocals on "The Truth")
- Ed Urlik – bass
- Chris Bagarozzi – guitar
