= Schoolhouse =

Schoolhouse and School House may refer to:

- School building
- House system
- One-room schools or Two-room schools, usually historic, and termed "schoolhouses" in the United States
- Schoolhouse Home Education Association
- Schoolhouse.world, a free online tutoring platform
- Schoolhouse Rock!
- School House, West Virginia
- The Schoolhouse, a mid-19th century public school building used as a performance space 2001–2005 in Hadley, Massachusetts
- The School House, an early American television program broadcast on the DuMont Television Network in 1949
