= Jorge Boehringer =

- Also known as: Core of the Coalman
- Born: Jorge Boehringer; March 17, 1975 (age 51)
- Origin: Syracuse, New York; United States
- Genres: Electronic music Avant-Garde Music; Noise; Experimental; Contemporary Music; Contemporary classical music Ambient; Electroacoustic music Pop
- Occupations: Composer, Artist
- Instruments: Viola, Various Instruments, Voice; Electronic musical instruments
- Years active: 1993 – present
- Labels: BOC; Resipiscent; Custodian Color Zoo; Dolor Del Estamago; Death Bomb Arc; Zum; Insect
- Website: myspace.com/opakptak

Jorge Boehringer is an electro-acoustic musician, composer, sound designer, and installation artist from the United States. He was born in New York in 1975, grew up in Texas, and in 1998 moved Oakland, California. He currently resides in Newcastle Upon Tyne, England.

== History ==
Boehringer's music makes frequent use of acoustic viola as well as electronic sources, and other acoustic sound sources.

In reference to a large ensemble piece composed in 2001, Boehringer says:

Games involving proportions between human scales of time and experience and those which can be observed within my environment tend to be useful in trying to understand the environment and consequently my sense of presence. These games tend to follow an ever-reductive pattern, in which I simplify the structures I am working with...[so that they] can then be transformed freely. Data, unlike rock mass, is extremely plastic even to the hand of thought alone, and, in addition, makes itself available to various algebras, conceptual transformations, and comparisons freely. Systems which are overtly periodic are somewhat self-simplifying (they repeat, more or less) and thus, when compared to more chaotic systems, lend themselves to such quantification readily.

The novel aural effects, temporal distortions, and open approach to staging in Boehringer's work as often invites comparison with visual artists as with musicians. The visual aspect of his work is, in fact, often an interplay between phenomenological aspects of sound or what is presented visually, with open questions regarding the meaning of the presentation itself. For instance, in "Rawing With the Hound of One's Own Acheing," a work borrowing its title from Robert Morris' "Box With the Sound of Its Own Making," Boehringer "amplified drawing one of his dense, wave-like images..."describes author Che Chen in Osirhan Osirhan issue 1 , resulting in an installation of both the recorded sound of the drawing and the resultant drawing itself in an Oakland gallery. Boehringer's approach to working with non art-based themes in his artwork and writing result in a dialogue similar to that found in the writing of artist Robert Smithson. His 2003 installation work Shelter, for example, is described as "an auditory earthwork" in which "recordings of radio beacons, insect announcements, warning chimes, foghorns, and other beacons where broadcast from various hilltops..."[in San Francisco]"A sonic metaphor of a crystal lattice, allowing breathing space for a population under stress from an increasingly militant political environment."[ibid]

Boehringer creates work for live performance as well as the recorded medium, film and video, and gallery presentation. He has composed music for the American Conservatory Theater (SF), cellist Loren Dempster, EnsembleInc (NYC), The Sf Sound Ensemble, the Mills College Contemporary Performance Ensemble, and for many other ensembles, dance groups, film productions, and individuals. He has released recordings with many experimental and noise music concerns such as Resipiscent Records (from San Francisco, California, USA) , Dolor Del Estamago (Tijuana, Mexico), DeathBombArc (Los Angeles, CA, USA), Insect (Prague, Czech Republic) and many others.

In addition to composing music for large and small ensembles, Boehringer performs often as a soloist. Notable in much of Boehringer's live performance is dark humor as expressed through costumes, theatrical devices, and bizarre textural program notes and descriptions of his work, such as "feedback driven yodel triggers presented simultaneously with carnastic arrays". As one of his alter-egos, Core of the Coalman, Boehringer has shared concerts with some of the most diverse experimental bands and artists including Gowns, Rubber O Cement, Deerhoof, Ikue Mori, Luciano Chessa, Badgerlore, Ramon Sender, Tralphaz, Sixes, the Breezy Days Band, Xome, Jessica Rylan, 0th, Bulbs, and Joshua Churchill to name a few. In addition, he collaborates directly with many well known members of the American and international experimental music communities. His roster of collaborators includes members of D Yellow Swans, Grouper, Marfa and Ne-Af, XBXRX, 16 Bitch Pile Up, Liz Allbee, 7 Year Rabbit Cycle, Miba, Above the Tree, and the Grey Daturas, and with artists as diverse as Tuesday Faust, Paul Baker, Bonnie Banks, and Che Chen.

Boehringer completed a master's degree at Mills College. His composition teachers there included Fred Frith, Pauline Oliveros, and Alvin Curran. He attended workshops during this time with Allan Kaprow, Marianne Amacher, and Paul De Marinis. Prior to this he studied composition privately in Texas with Gerald Gabel.

Boehringer is active as a producer and editor of small publications such as the one-off book Yam Yad, a collaboration between Boehringer and visual artists Eric King and Matt Vollgraff, and the ongoing publication Femme Toupee whose focus is a juxtaposition of audio and visual works from a wide variety of experimental artists. In addition, Boehringer is also a curator and an organizer of festival concerts for such organizations as Mission Creek Music and Arts Festival and the Music For People & Thingamajigs Festival. He has also acted as curator for gallery shows and a concert series.

== Discography ==
- ASOLTMUSKET (BOC) - 2008
- rrrr (Insect) - 2007
- Carnasie (Custodian Color Zoo Containers) – 2007
- Asolt Musket (Sauce Juice) – 2007
- Anxiety (Resipiscent) – 2007
- Consider, Pigtails (DeathBombArc) – 2006
- Murder At Maybeck Manor (Dolor Del Estamago) – 2006
- Spirograph/End Grain (Zum) – 2006
- Snow Lights (Insect)-2005
- Unsynchronized Eye (Insect)-2005
- A Collection of Clear Songs (self-released)-2005
- The Charmed and Strange (self-released)-2004
- When We Go (self-released)-2004
- Others Pertaining to the Lighthouse Establishment (Insect)-2003

=== Compilations ===
- Various artists – Brutal Sound FX (Enterruption) – 2007
- Various artists – Ocean Bleach (Dolor Del Estamago) – 2007
- Various artists – The Fruit Will Rot:New California Artists (DeathBombArc) – 2006

=== Collaborations ===
- Energy Patterns:Jorge Boehringer, Sound+ Paul Baker, Video, DVD-2007
- Flash Lights: Jorge Boehringer/Liz Harris (Grouper)– Eckords (Students of Decay) – 2006
- Treehugger: Jorge Boehringer, George Chen, Liz Harris, Gabriel Mindel, Steve Touchton– The Fruit Will Rot (DeathBombArc) – 2006
- Audible Delusions Ensemble– Winter Weapons (Heathen Skulls) – 2006
- 7 Year Rabbit Cycle – Ache Horns (Free Porcupine Society) – 2006
