= Chalk Circle (American band) =

American punk rock band

- Origin: Washington, D.C., United States
- Genres: Punk rock, post-punk, art punk, hardcore punk
- Years active: 1981–1983
- Labels: Outside Records, WGNS Recordings
- Past members: Sharon Cheslow; Anne Bonafede; Mary Green; Jan Pumphrey; Tamera Lyndsay; Chris Niblack

Chalk Circle were an American punk rock band formed in 1981 in Washington, D.C. Their raw, rhythmic, minimal sound had more in common with post-punk or art punk than D.C. hardcore, a community they initially helped pioneer. Guitarist/vocalist Sharon Cheslow and drummer Anne Bonafede were joined by guitarist/vocalist Mary Green and alternating bassists Jan Pumphrey, Tamera Lyndsay, and Chris Niblack before the group disbanded in 1983.

== History ==
Anne Bonafede and Sharon Cheslow began playing music in 1980, after developing friendships through the Bad Brains, Henry Rollins, Teen Idles, and Untouchables. After Cheslow saw a Bad Brains rehearsal with Rollins in March 1980, and then survived meningitis that summer, she decided to form a band. Rollins was initially interested in joining the band as singer, before he started his own band S.O.A. in October 1980 and then joined Black Flag in 1981. Bassist Bert Queiroz from the Untouchables rehearsed with Cheslow on guitar and Bonafede on drums in 1980, and Cheryl Celso became vocalist until she was replaced by Mary Green in 1981. Bonafede chose to play drums in the DIY punk spirit. She said, "I could be a drummer if I wanted to be. All my [male] friends had been playing in bands so I knew I could just do it, that was the punk philosophy. It tied very much into my feminist growth as well."

In March 1981, Chalk Circle had its first rehearsal as an all-women quartet, with Green's friend Jan Pumphrey briefly on bass. They took their band name from Bertolt Brecht's play The Caucasian Chalk Circle and the Chinese legend The Chalk Circle from which Brecht's play was derived, as well as liking the sound and open-ended meaning of a "chalk circle". The group played their first show in July 1981, opening for Velvet Monkeys and R.E.M. (later Egoslavia), with Sally Ven Yu Berg from the latter group filling in on bass. Berg was then replaced on bass by Tamera Lyndsay – both worked at the 9:30 Club in Washington, D.C.

Chalk Circle's original sound was energetic, percussive, angular, and minimal, with Bonafede's drumming style sounding primitive and psychedelic. Green's lyrics were existential, feminist, and poetic, and she and Cheslow sometimes sang in unison or call and response. Besides punk and hardcore, their music was influenced by 1960s/70s rock music, funk, go-go, and jazz. Green and Cheslow collaborated on songwriting, with Green writing most of the lyrics and Cheslow writing most of the music.

When the D.C. hardcore scene became more macho and male-dominated, Chalk Circle were put down for being all girls. But they got support from art punk bands such as Velvet Monkeys and Half Japanese. Cheslow said, "Our goal was never to sound like one of the all-boy hardcore bands. We had our own sound, based on lots of different music we listened to." The group played only four shows, which could have had something to do with the way their post-punk sound didn't align with the uniform thrashing of their peers; Dischord Records decided Chalk Circle didn't fit in with their roster. That didn't deter the band, however. In a 1982 interview, Cheslow said, "It was kinda hard being girls. But look, if men can do it, so can women, and we said, 'Who cares? We're gonna do it.'" Green added, "We want to be taken seriously. We want to be taken for people." Cheslow later said, "I wanted to create my own culture. That's what punk had taught me, that I should be free to create as a girl."

The group did their first studio demo in early 1982, with Lyndsay on bass, at Inner Ear Studios with Don Zientara and Howard Wuelfing (Slickee Boys, Nurses, Half Japanese). Their sound became more noisy and experimental as they progressed, while retaining a sense of melody. They recorded a second Inner Ear session with Chris Niblack on bass, and released two of those songs on the Outside Records LP compilation Mixed Nuts Don't Crack. WGNS Recordings released Chalk Circle songs on cassette compilations between 1982 and 1984. Although the group later slipped through the cracks of D.C. punk history, except as a sidenote in riot grrrl histories, at the time they were part of the national/international punk community.

== Legacy ==
A twelve-song collection of Chalk Circle's early 1980s studio material and some live recordings was released on the Reflection LP in 2011, with liner notes by Don Fleming. "Reflection" was a joint effort by Mississippi Records and Post Present Medium, the label headed by Dean Spunt of No Age. During Chalk Circle's short existence in the heyday of D.C.'s first golden era of hardcore, the group broke through musical and gender barriers to create a sound that captured the joyful excitement of forgoing standard structures.

The group were notable as the first all-women band to emerge from D.C.'s punk scene. Other than vocal girl groups, Chalk Circle were the first all-female group to record and perform in D.C. since the International Sweethearts of Rhythm in the 1940s.

Sally Berg and Tamera Lyndsay moved to New York and formed SHE with Laura Kennedy (Bush Tetras) and Claudia Summers. Lyndsay also collaborated with Adele Bertei (Contortions, Bloods), Lesley Woods (Au Pairs), Barbara Gogan (The Passions), and Clare Hirst (Belle Stars). Lyndsay then became a shoe and accessories designer, whose work was seen on The L Word's fourth season. After Chalk Circle disbanded, Sharon Cheslow joined Bloody Mannequin Orchestra, co-authored Cynthia Connolly's and Leslie Clague's 1988 book Banned in DC: Photos and Anecdotes From the DC Punk Underground (79–85), collaborated with various musicians including Kathleen Hanna in Suture, published Interrobang?!, and formed Coterie Exchange. Anne Bonafede wrote for Shattered Wig Review. Chris Niblack toured with No Trend.

== Members ==
- Mary Green – vocals, guitar (1981–1983)
- Sharon Cheslow – guitar, vocals (1981–1983)
- Anne Bonafede – drums (1981–1983)
- Jan Pumphrey – bass (1981)
- Tamera Lyndsay – bass (1981-1982)
- Chris Niblack – bass (1982-1983)

== Discography ==
=== Albums ===
- 2011 - Reflection - Mississippi Records/Post Present Medium

=== Tracks on compilations ===
- 1983 - "The Slap" and "Subversive Pleasure" on Mixed Nuts Don't Crack - Outside Records
- 1983 - "We Got the Beat" (as Crayon Square) on The Christmas Cassette - WGNS cassettes
- 1983 - "Uneasy Friend," "Reflection," "Easy Escapes" on Timeclock Equals Hole in Head - WGNS cassettes
- 1984 - "Sister Superior," "Scrambled" on We Gots No Station - WGNS cassettes
- 2003 - "The Slap," "Subversive Pleasure" on Homework #9: DIY/punkwave '77-'86 - Hyped to Death
