= Dave Smalley =

American musician

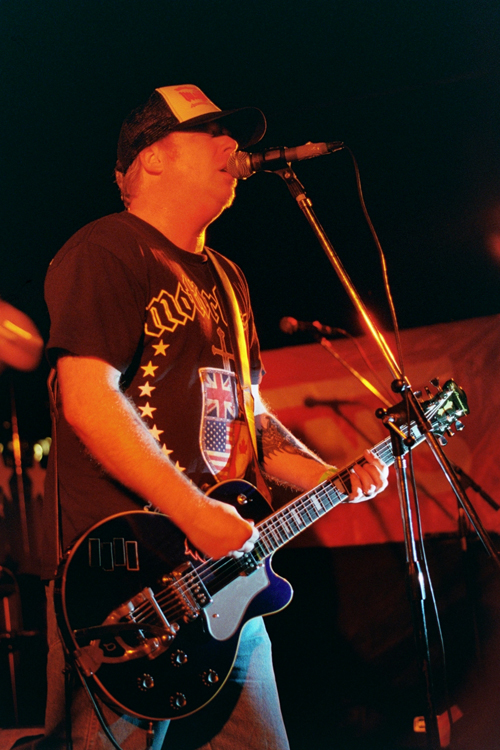
- Smalley performing with Down by Law in 2009

Background information
- Origin: Washington, D.C., United States
- Genres: Punk rock
- Instruments: Vocals, guitar
- Years active: 1983–present

Dave Smalley is an American musician, best known as the lead singer for the hardcore punk bands DYS and Dag Nasty, and skate punk band All as well as lead singer/guitarist with Down by Law. He is known for his influence on pop punk music and his early contributions to the emo genre. He also founded a side project called the Sharpshooters, whose music is influenced by mod revival bands such as the Jam. Smalley has also produced and appeared on Canadian punk band Penelope's second album, Face au silence du monde, recorded by Don Zientara at Inner Ear Studio in Arlington, Virginia.

He received a bachelor's degree from Boston College and a masters in political science from California State University Los Angeles. He resides with his family in Fredericksburg, Virginia, where he works as a features editor of the Weekender section of the town's newspaper, the Free Lance-Star. He previously worked as the youth editor for it!, a teen news supplement to the Free Lance-Star, and won several awards for that section.

In 2016, Smalley released a solo album, Punk Rock Days. The album features acoustic arrangements of Dag Nasty and Down by Law material, as well as new songs and Irish folk music. The album featured contributions by guitarists from Down by Law and Dag Nasty, as well as family members of Smalley.

In 2017, he started fronting a new band called Don't Sleep. They have since released two EPs: the self-titled Don't Sleep EP on Unity Worldwide Records (2017), and the Bring The Light 7-inch on Reaper Records (2018). The band also did a tour with Shelter in 2018. Their first LP, Turn The Tide, is being released on Mission Two Entertainment in September 2020.

Since 2017, Dave Smalley has a new band called Dave Smalley & the Bandoleros. They released an album in 2018 called Join the Outsiders and had plans to play several shows in Europe.

== Discography ==
=== DYS ===
- 1983 – Brotherhood (Vocals)
- 1984 – DYS (Vocals)
- 1989 – Fire And Ice (prior two records on one CD) (Vocals)
- 2005 – Wolfpack – "Brotherhood," re-released with the band's original Wolfpack radio demo
- 2011 – More than Fashion: LIVE from the Gallery East Reunion – live tracks from the band's initial reunion show, featuring songs from both of their studio albums, Bridge 9 Records
- 2011 – "Wild Card" – Single on Bridge 9 Records
- 2011 – "Sound of our Town" – Single on Bridge 9 Records
- 2012 – "Unloaded" – Single on Bridge 9 Records
- 2012 – "(We are) The Road Crew" (Motorhead Cover) – Single on Bridge 9 Records
- 2012 – "Brotherhood 2012" – Single on Bridge 9 Records
- 2012 – "True Believers" – Single on Bridge 9 Records

=== Dag Nasty ===
- 1986 – Can I Say (Vocals)
- 1992 – Four on the Floor (Vocals)
- 2002 – Minority of One (Vocals)

=== ALL ===
- 1988- Allroy Sez (Vocals)
- 1988- Allroy for Prez (Vocals)

=== Down By Law ===
- 1991 – Down by Law (Vocals, Guitar)
- 1992 – Blue (Vocals, Guitar)
- 1993 – D.C. Guns (Vocals, Guitar)
- 1994 – Yellow Rat Bastard (Vocals, Guitar)
- 1994 – punkrockacademyfightsong (Vocals, Guitar)
- 1996 – All Scratched Up (Vocals, Guitar)
- 1997 – Last of the Sharpshooters (Vocals, Guitar)
- 1999 – Fly the Flag (Vocals, Guitar)
- 2003 – windwardtidesandwaywardsails (Vocals, Guitar)
- 2012 – Champions At Heart (vocals, guitar)
- 2014 – Revolution Time (vocals, guitar)
- 2018 – All In (vocals, guitar)

=== Dave Smalley & the Bandoleros ===
- 2018 – Join the Outsiders (vocals)
- 2020 – Ignited (vocals)

=== Don't Sleep ===
- 2017 – Don't Sleep (Vocals)
- 2018 – Bring the Light (Vocals)
- 2020 – Turn The Tide (Vocals)

=== Other ===
- 1990 – Rule of Thumb – Don't look Down – Club Rat records (vocals)
- 1990 – Chemical People – The Right Thing (Background Vocals)
- 1998 – Two Man Advantage – drafted (Producer, Background Vocals)
- 1999 – Under The Gun – Nowhere to Run (Producer, Guest Vocals on "The Mirror")
- 2000 – The Sharpshooters – Viva Los Guerillas (Vocals, Guitar)
- 2002 – Penelope – Face au silence du monde (Background Vocals)
- 2009 – Pocket – Beautiful Gray (Vocals)
- 2010 – Marc Ganancias – Painted Walls (Guest Vocals on "Rewind & Repeat")
- 2013 – Marc Ganancias – Policy of Discontent (Guest vocals on "Yours Truly")
- 2016 – Dave Smalley – Punk Rock Days
