= Food for Thought =

Food for Thought may refer to:

== Music ==
=== Albums ===
- Food for Thought (The J.B.'s album)
- Food for Thought (Pink Cream 69 album)
- Food for Thought (Young Rome album)
- Food for Thought, a 2004 album by the band Santana
- Food for Thought, a 2005 Iron Maiden tribute album
- Food for Thought/Take It Back, a 1990 album by American band Gray Matter

=== Songs ===
- "Food for Thought" (song), a 1980 song by UB40
- "Food for Thought", a 1983 song by 10cc

== Television ==
- Food for Thought, a British documentary series presented by Brian J. Ford
- "Food for Thought", an episode of Alvin and the Chipmunks
- "Food for Thought" (Doctors), a 2003 episode
- "Food for Thought", an episode of That's So Raven
- "Food for Thought", the fourth episode of Tales From The Crypt season 5

== Other uses ==
- Food for Thought (restaurant), a former vegetarian restaurant in London, England
- Food for Thought, a café within the Black Cat nightclub
