= Jackson Township, Madison County, Iowa =

Township in Madison County, Iowa, U.S.

Coordinates: 41.374°N 94.184°W

Jackson Township is a township in Madison County, Iowa, in the United States.

== History ==
Jackson Township was organized in 1860. One of the earliest settlements in the area was Charlottesville.
