= The Marshes =

American punk band

The Marshes are an American punk band, from Northampton, Massachusetts, that originally included Colin Sears (drums), Emil Busi (bass, vocals) and Steven Wardlaw (guitar).

== Career ==
Drummer Colin Sears, who was best known for playing with Dag Nasty in the mid-1980s to early 1990s, formed The Marshes with his longtime friend, Emil Busi, in 1994. The Marshes released their first self-titled EP on Sike Records in 1995, which got the band signed to Grass Records which was part of the major record label, BMG. However, the band were quickly dropped, with little support behind 1996's Fledgling. Many of their lyrics on Fledgling were based on the fiction of HP Lovecraft.

The band signed to Dr. Strange Records and released Pox on the Tracts in 1997, before taking a few years off. When the Marshes went on hiatus, Sears moved on to play in the Portland, Oregon band, Handgun Bravado, which is also still active. However, Busi left the music business during the Marshes' hiatus. Also, in the interim, Steven Wardlaw became a member of The New Harmful, and then formed So Very Small.

The Marshes returned in 2000 to release Recluse, which appeared to be their final album, until the band returned in May 2010 to play two reunion shows and release a new single "Vicious Beast" (b/w Coney Island Whitefish) on Dr. Strange Records. The band's MySpace site stated we "still have a bunch of old and new songs we will release."

== Discography ==
=== Albums ===
- The Marshes (1995 Sike Records)
  - 1. "I Am Providence"
  - 2. "Summer Fun"
  - 3. "Brut Zone"
  - 4. "Cave"
  - 5. "Beneath"
  - 6. "Portcullis"
  - 7. "Tombstone"
  - (NB: Bitzcore released this album in Europe, with the bonus tracks, "Whatever You Want" and "Drowning Man").
- Fledgling (1996 Grass Records/BMG)
  - 1. "Offshore"
  - 2. "Flat Out"
  - 3. "Obnoxious"
  - 4. "Benefit Street"
  - 5. "Anniversary"
  - 6. "Shadow"
  - 7. "Intelligencia"
  - 8. "Little Napoleon"
  - 9. "Cliff"
  - 10. "The Puppy and the Smoke Stack"
  - 11. "Slump"
  - 12. "Goat Song"
  - (NB: BMG owns the rights to both Fledgling and The Marshes. They are both out of print).
- Pox on the Tracts (1997 Dr. Strange Records)
  - 1. "Girl on the Bus"
  - 2. "Big Fat I Love You"
  - 3. "Pox on the Tracts"
  - 4. "Grandpa"
  - 5. "Facelift"
  - 6. "Polly Logies"
  - 7. "Wahmbulence"
  - 8. "The Investigator"
  - 9. "A Better View"
  - 10. "Speed Whore"
- Recluse (2000 Dr. Strange Records)
  - 1. "Crazy Old Addled Bastard"
  - 2. "Gardener's Hoe"
  - 3. "Clarification"
  - 4. "Pink Ones Pay"
  - 5. "A Little Nother"
  - 6. "Wallingford"
  - 7. "Pool Key"
  - 8. "Charle's Song"
  - 9. "Give Me"
  - 10. "Drunken Baiting"
  - 11. "Friends"
  - 12. "The Fool"

=== Singles ===
- "Vicious Beast" / "Coney Island Whitefish" (2010, Dr. Strange Records)

=== Split singles ===
- Ain't She Fun" with "Whatever You Want" / "Drowning Man" (1996 Helitrope Records)
- With Feds included "Delinquence" / "I Touch Myself" (1997 Dr. Strange Records)
- With Fake Hyppi included "A Little Nother" / "Pulled Up" (1997 Kerosene Records - French release)
- With Travis Cut included "Restraint" / "Into You Like a Train" (cover of The Psychedelic Furs track (1998 Speedowax Records - UK release)
- With Burning Heads included "The Lodger" / "Few Words" (cover of Burning Heads) (1998 Pandemonium Records - French release)
