= Chemical People =

American punk rock band

- Origin: Los Angeles, California, U.S.
- Genres: Punk rock
- Years active: 1986–1997
- Labels: Cruz, Two Inch Pecker, Vinyl Solution
- Past members: Dave Naz; Ed Urlik; Jaime Pina; Blair Jobe; Robert Hecker; Dave Landry; Greg Cameron
- Website: http://www.chemicalpeople.com/

Chemical People were an American punk rock band formed in Los Angeles in 1986. The band toured the United States, Canada and in Europe and broke up in 1997.

== History ==
The band's initial line-up was Dave Nazworthy (a.k.a. Dave Naz - vocals, drums, guitar), Ed Urlik (bass guitar), Jaime Pina (guitar), and Blair Jobe (vocals, guitar). Jobe left the band prior to the release of debut album So Sexist! in 1988. They followed this with Ten-Fold Hate in 1989, with hardcore pornography a common lyrical theme with guest vocals by Jack Baker on the track 'Black Throat' (for the XXX flick of the same name which Baker starred in) and porn star Taija Rae on the cover.

In 1990, Nazworthy and Urlik teamed up with Dave Smalley to form Down by Law. They returned to Chemical People and released the mini-set Angels 'n' Devils towards the end of the year. The band contributed soundtrack material to several porn films and these were collected on the 1991 album Soundtracks.

Pina left, and guitar duties were handled by Dave Naz, Ed Urlik and by Redd Kross guitarist Robert Hecker, and the new line-up recorded the Chemical People album (1992).

After a five-year hiatus, the band returned in 1997 with a new album, Arpeggio Motorcade, after which they stopped actively playing live in 1998. Chemical People still remain a band hidden away, playing occasionally in their studio with members Dave Naz, Ed Urlik and Jaime Pina. At some point the band may be back playing shows...

== Band members ==
- Dave Naz – vocals, drums (1986–1997)
- Ed Urlik – bass (1986–1997)
- Jaime Pina – guitar (1988–1990)
- Blair Jobe – vocals, guitar (1986)
- Robert Hecker – guitar (1992)
- Dave Landry – drums (1997) (Arpeggio Motorcade)
- Greg Cameron – drums (1997)

== Discography ==
=== Albums ===
- So Sexist! (1988) Cruz
- Ten-Fold Hate (1989) Cruz
- Overdosed On... (1989) Vinyl Solution
- The Right Thing (1990) Cruz
- The Singles (1990) 2" Pecker
- Soundtracks (1991) Cruz
- Angels & Devils mini-album (1991) Cruz
- Chemical People (1992) Cruz
- Arpeggio Motorcade (1997) Cruz

=== Singles, EPs ===
- "The Good, The Bad & The Ugly" (1986) Chemical People
- "Black Throat" (1988) 2" Pecker
- Fan Club Single (1988) 2" Pecker
- "X-Feminist" (1989) 2" Pecker
- "Are You Butt Phace?" (1989) 2" Pecker
- Live '89 (1989) 2" Pecker
- "Ask the Angels" (1990) 2" Pecker
- "Cum, Blister, Bleed" (1990) 2" Pecker
- "Getaway" (1991) Cruz
- Let It Go EP (1992) Cruz
- "Ask the Angels" (1993) Vinyl Solution

== Compilation appearances ==
- The Melting Plot - SST Records 1988
- Every Band Has A Shonen Knife Who Loves Them - Rockville Records 1989
- Hard To Believe - C/Z Records 1990
- Gabba Gabba Hey - Triple X Records 1991
- R.A.F.R. Volume 2 - Flipside Records 1997
- Serial Killer - 1999
