= Dag Nasty =

American punk rock band

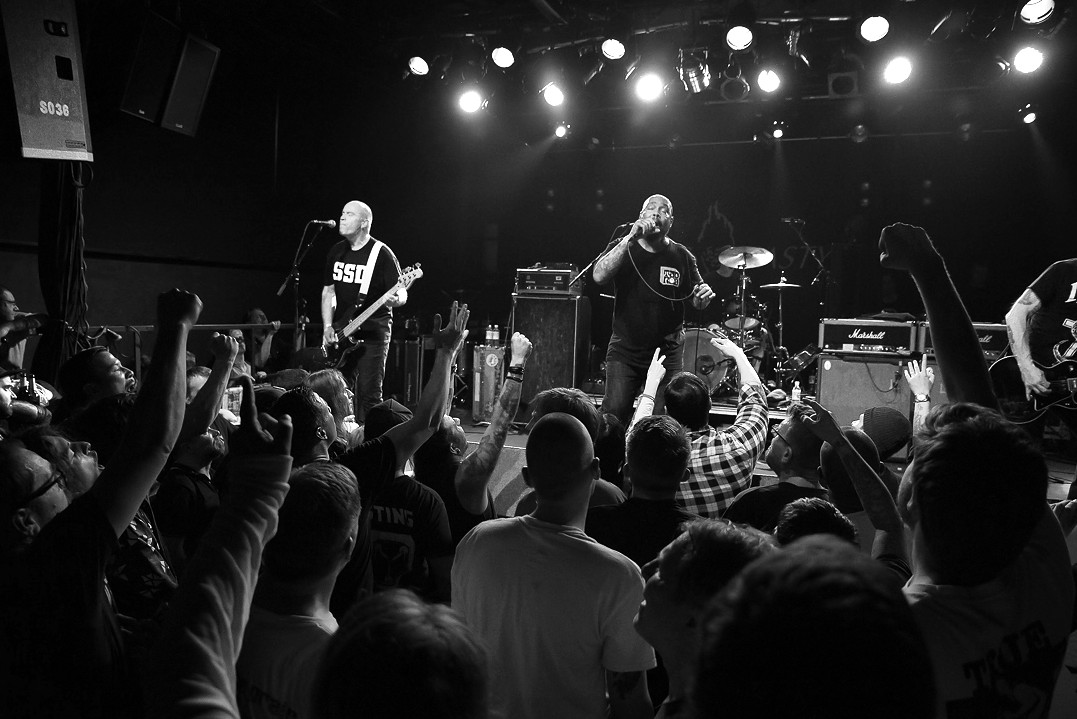
- Dag Nasty in 2016

Background information
- Origin: Washington D.C., U.S.
- Genres: Hardcore punk; emo; post-hardcore; melodic hardcore
- Years active: 1985–1986; 1987–1988; 1992; 2002; 2012; 2015–2018
- Labels: Dischord; Revelation; Epitaph; Giant
- Spinoffs: Swiz
- Spinoff of: Minor Threat; Bloody Mannequin Orchestra
- Members: Shawn Brown; Brian Baker; Roger Marbury; Colin Sears
- Past members: Peter Cortner; Dave Smalley; Doug Carrion; Scott Garrett; London May
- Website: daghouse.com

Dag Nasty was an American hardcore punk band from Washington D.C., formed in 1985 by guitarist Brian Baker of Minor Threat, drummer Colin Sears and bassist Roger Marbury, both of Bloody Mannequin Orchestra, and vocalist Shawn Brown (later of Swiz and Jesuseater). Their style of less aggressive, melodic hardcore was influential to post-hardcore.

== History ==
Shawn Brown was the first vocalist with whom the band recorded unreleased versions of most of the material that later made up their first release Can I Say, which featured former roadie and new singer Dave Smalley of DYS. Dave left the band to attend grad school at New York University before a summer tour with The Descendents. A new singer, Peter Cortner, was found after the band placed an ad in a local paper and the tour was kept. After touring half the US opening for The Descendents, the band went home and recorded new material that wasn't released until years later. After a few more local shows, the band broke up in the fall of 1986. Brian went to L.A. to start a new band with Doug Carrion and half of Doggy Style called Doggie Rock. After releasing one album under the Doggie Style name, Doggie Rock broke up and Brian reformed Dag Nasty in early 1987 with Peter, Colin and Doug replacing Roger Marbury, who declined to rejoin. Months later, the band recorded and released Wig Out at Denko's, including rerecorded versions of the late 1986 tape and new material.

In 1988, the band released their album Field Day on Giant Records, which was distributed by Dutch East India Trading. It was an ambitious album, often generating sharply polarised appraisals from fans: many hated it and many loved it. Field Day attempted to blend pop melodies with hardcore and metal riffs even further than previously attempted on Wig Out. The result was, at times, uneven but helped to usher in a new style of hardcore with more controlled playing, guitar effects, acoustic elements and slower tempos. The band split up shortly after touring for Field Day ended.

In 1992, Dag Nasty reformed with Smalley on vocals and released the album Four on the Floor. In 1991, Selfless Records had released 85-86, a collection of early, pre-Can I Say recordings.

In 2002, the band got back together, again with Smalley on the mic, returning the band to a hardcore sound. The result of this reunion was the album Minority of One. To this day they still release records, though Dag Nasty remains more of a side project for its members than a full-time active band. Cortner, who has not been involved with the band directly for years, completed his education as a lawyer, practiced law and recently became a schoolteacher. While strictly as a personal hobby now, Cortner has continued to make music under the names GPFA and, more recently, in a collaboration with Philadelphia area musicians entitled The Gerunds. He and Doug Carrion also have a project called Field Day where they perform songs from Cortner's era of Dag Nasty records. Sears went on to play in The Marshes and later after moving to Portland, Oregon for Handgun Bravado and The Valley Floor. He also works as a city planner for the Portland Development Commission. The other members of the band have remained involved in music.

Baker joined Bad Religion after Brett Gurewitz left to focus on his own record label (Epitaph Records) and continued to play in the band when Gurewitz rejoined.

In 2009, Brian Baker said he wanted to make a new Dag Nasty record with Peter Cortner. "We want to do another record with Peter singing at some point and that will be the next one we do. I've spoken with Colin and Roger and they want to do it with Peter next time. Maybe a year from now, who knows? Whenever people are available. The one thing about Peter is that he's a really good lyricist. That's always been his strong point"

In October 2012, Dag Nasty announced a reunion show in Washington DC with their original singer, Shawn Brown. On December 28, 2012, the original Dag Nasty line up played the Black Cat in support of the upcoming documentary "Salad Days: The DC Punk Revolution". The bill also featured Government Issue, another Washington DC punk reunion.

The group was reformed again in 2015. It was announced that year on May 30, 2016, Dag Nasty will tour Europe in the spring of 2016 and play the Punk Rock Bowling Music Festival in Las Vegas, and on June 11 in Asbury Park, New Jersey. A 7 inch single was released on Dischord Records in May 2016.

== Musical style ==
Critics have categorised Dag Nasty's music as hardcore punk, melodic hardcore, emo and post-hardcore.

Stephen Thomas Erlewine of AllMusic said of Dag Nasty: "Although the group was more accessible and melodic than Minor Threat, it never lost its bracing, blistering edge." Erlewine noted the increase in pop elements upon Peter Cortner's entry into the band in 1986.

Dag Nasty have cited numerous bands as influences, including the Damned, the Ruts, Buzzcocks, the Clash, and Descendents. Additionally, guitarist Brian Baker has cited R.E.M., the Smiths, XTC, the Beatles, Bad Brains, Hoodoo Gurus, and early U2, particularly their debut album Boy (1980), as major influences on his guitar playing. Doug Carrion cited the Beatles, Minutemen, R.E.M., the Smiths and Meat Puppets.

They have been cited as an influence by Leatherface.

== Band members ==
Current members

- Shawn Brown – lead vocals (1985–1986, 2012, 2015–present)
- Brian Baker – guitars (1985–1986, 1987–1988, 1992, 2002, 2012, 2015–present)
- Roger Marbury – bass, backing vocals (1985–1986, 1992, 2002, 2012, 2015–present)
- Colin Sears – drums (1985–1986, 1987, 1992, 2002, 2012, 2015–present)

Former members

- Peter Cortner – lead vocals (1987–1988)
- Dave Smalley – lead vocals (1986, 1992, 2002)
- Doug Carrion – bass, backing vocals (1987–1988)
- Scott Garrett – drums (1987–1988)
- London May – drums (1987–1988)

Timeline

== Discography ==
=== Albums ===
- Can I Say LP (Dischord Records, 1986)
- Wig Out at Denko's LP (Dischord Records, 1987)
- Field Day LP (Giant Records, 1988)
- Four on the Floor LP/CD (Epitaph Records, 1992)
- Minority of One LP/CD (Revelation Records, 2002)
- Dag with Shawn LP/CD (Dischord Records, 2010) – recorded in 1985, features songs from first album with Brown on vocals

=== Reissues and compilations ===
- Can I Say/Wig Out at Denko's CD (Dischord Records, 1991)
- 85-86 LP/7" Box Set/CD (Selfless Records, 1991)
- Can I Say and Wig Out at Denko's were remastered and separately re-released by Dischord in 2002.

=== Singles and EPs ===
- All Ages Show 7" (Giant Records, 1987)
- Trouble Is 12" (Giant Records, 1988)
- Cold Heart 7" (Dischord Records, 2016)
