= L.A. Explosion! =

Studio album by the Last
- Released: August 15, 1979
- Recorded: December 1978 – February 1979
- Studio: Media Art Studio, Hermosa Beach
- Genre: Power pop
- Label: Bomp!
- Producer: John Harrison, the Last

The Last chronology
L.A. Explosion! (1979)	Painting Smiles on a Dead Man (1985)

L.A. Explosion! is the debut studio album by American power pop band the Last, released in 1979 by record label Bomp!.

== Reception ==
Professional ratings
Review scores
Source	Rating
AllMusic	4/5 stars
Exclaim!	favourable

Trouser Press called it "a near-perfect debut, marred only by flat production." In 1988, The Washington Post wrote that, "before the onslaught of corporate pop-rock ... there was one L. A. power-pop combo that was for real: The Last, whose classic 1979 L. A. Explosion album influenced popsters and punkers alike."

== Track listing ==
No.	Title	Writer(s)	Length
1.	"She Don't Know Why I'm Here"	Joe Nolte	3:29
2.	"This Kind of Feeling"	Joe Nolte	2:53
3.	"Bombing of London"	Joe Nolte	2:34
4.	"Century City Rag"	Joe Nolte	2:39
5.	"Walk Like Me"	Joe Nolte	2:39
6.	"Slavedriver"	Joe Nolte	1:55
7.	"Every Summer Day"	Joe Nolte	3:36
8.	"The Rack"	Mike Nolte, Joe Nolte	1:35
9.	"Objections"	Joe Nolte	2:40
10.	"A Fool Like You"	Vitus Mataré	2:00
11.	"Someone's Laughing"	Joe Nolte	3:16
12.	"I Don't Wanna Be in Love"	Joe Nolte	1:30
13.	"Be-Bop-a-Lula"	Gene Vincent, Donald Graves, Bill "Sheriff Tex" Davis	4:00
14.	"Looking At You"	Joe Nolte	3:09
15.	"The Rack (Reprise)"	Mike Nolte, Joe Nolte	1:23
Total length:			39:13

== Personnel ==
The Last

- Joe Nolte - guitar, lead vocals
- Vitus Mataré - keyboard, flute
- Mike Nolte - backing vocals, lead vocals on tracks 4, 8 and 15
- David Nolte - bass, lead vocals on track 12
- Jack Reynolds - drums
