= Down by Law (band) =

American punk rock band

- Origin: Los Angeles, California, U.S.
- Genre: Punk rock
- Years active: 1989–2003, 2008–present
- Labels: DC-Jam, Union Label Group, Epitaph, Kung Fu, Cleopatra
- Members: Dave Smalley; Sam Williams; Matt Morris; John DiMambro
- Past members: Jaime Pina; Dave Naz; Ed Urlik; Chris Bagarozzi; Mark Phillips; Hunter Oswald; Pat Hoed; Jack Criswell; Kevin Coss; Danny Westman; Chris Lagerborg; Milo Todesco; Keith Davies

Down by Law is an American punk rock band formed in 1989 by former All frontman Dave Smalley, who is the only remaining original member. The band has released eleven studio albums. They stayed on Epitaph Records until 1998 and have since switched to other labels. Down by Law has never achieved substantial commercial success, but a number of largely popular acts cite them as influential, and they have an underground following. After several lineup changes, the band went on hiatus from touring and recording in 2003, but resurfaced in 2008 before beginning work on new material and embarking on their first tour in six years in 2009. In 2017, the band reunited their Punkrockacademyfightsong lineup and are currently active and touring.

== Biography ==
After Dave Smalley left All in 1989, he formed Down by Law with Chris Bagarozzi on guitar, Ed Urlik on bass and Dave Naz on drums. The band considers their first show to be held on March 10, 1990, at the Anti-Club in Hollywood. After signing to Epitaph Records, they released their debut album, which is self-titled, in 1991. It was produced by Brett Gurewitz, guitarist of punk rock band Bad Religion and the founder of Epitaph.

Down by Law entered the studio to record their second album, Blue, in 1992 (again produced by Gurewitz). After the touring to promote the album, they parted ways with their original lineup in 1993, leaving Smalley as the band's only original member. Bagarozzi, Urlik and Naz were replaced by Sam Williams III, Angry John Di Mambro and Hunter Oswald on guitar, bass and drums respectively. The new lineup recorded their third album Punkrockacademyfightsong, which was released in 1994 and is generally cited as their best selling release. Video clips for the songs "Hit or Miss" and the cover of The Proclaimers' "I'm Gonna Be (500 Miles)" were made and they received some airplay on MTV and radio stations. To support the album, Down by Law embarked on a year-long tour and on some shows they supported bands like Burning Heads and The Vandals as well as their now-former labelmates NOFX, The Offspring, Pennywise and Bad Religion. Down by Law recorded and released two more albums, All Scratched Up (1996) and Last of the Sharpshooters (1997) before they left Epitaph in 1998. A brief stint on Go-Kart Records saw the release of Fly the Flag (1999). Shortly after the release of the album, bassist John DiMambro and drummer Chris Lagerborg departed the band. Lagerborg would die in his sleep in 2002. He was 33 years old. They were succeeded by Keith Davies on bass and Milo Todesco on drums. In December 2002, the band signed to Union 2112 Records, who would release Windwardtidesandwaywardsails in May 2003. Neither album was as successful as their Epitaph releases. The band went on a hiatus later that same year.

In August 2008, Down by Law announced that they were working on an album for and posted a new track called "Bullets" on their official website. In 2009, Down by Law embarked on their first tour since 2003, where they played shows in South America as well as some shows in the United States. "Crystal" was posted online in February 2010. They also played two shows in Florida in April 2010 and two shows in the Netherlands that October. On August 3, 2011, Smalley posted an update on Down by Law's Facebook page saying, "so there are new songs by DBL, being mixed as we speak... Sam rocks the songwriting as always. Hopefully we'll release something soon, either online or with a label."

In late 2011, Down by Law announced a signing with DC Jam Records, with an album release expected in August 2012. The album Champions at Heart was released in 2012, followed in 2013 by a seven-track mini album, Revolution Time, on Floricore Records (CD only), which was released in expanded form on 10" coloured vinyl in 2014 by UK label Dry Heave records. The additional tracks were acoustic cover versions of "Gotta Getaway" (Stiff Little Fingers), "Whiskey In The Jar" (Thin Lizzy), and "(What's So Funny 'Bout) Peace, Love, and Understanding" (Elvis Costello). There were also some European shows at this time including a week of UK shows (the first in over a decade) in mid-2014. In late 2015 and into 2016, Smalley has been playing a number of solo shows playing tracks from across his career including material from DYS, Dag Nasty, All as well as Down by Law, this has included a mainland Europe tour in May and June 2016. In 2017, Dimambro and Oswald would rejoin the band. Down by Law is still active to this day, continuing to perform live and having released further albums (All In in 2018, Lonely Town in 2021 and Crazy Days in 2024).

== Personnel ==
Current members

- Dave Smalley – vocals, guitar (1989–present)
- Sam Williams – guitar (1994–present)
- Hunter Oswald – drums (1993–1996, 2017–present)
- John DiMambro – bass (1994–1999, 2017–present)

Former members

- Jaime Pina – guitar (1989)
- Dave Naz – drums, vocals (1989–1993)
- Ed Urlik – bass, vocals (1989–1993)
- Chris Bagarozzi – guitar, vocals (1989–1993)
- Mark Phillips – guitar, vocals (1993–1994)
- Pat Hoed – bass (1993–1994)
- Danny Westman – drums (1996–1997)
- Chris Lagerborg – drums (1997–1999; died 2002)
- Milo Todesco – drums (1999–2003)
- Keith Davies – bass (1999–2003)
- Kevin Coss – bass (2008–2016)
- Jack Criswell – drums (2008–2016)

== Discography ==
Studio albums

- Down by Law (1991)
- blue (1992)
- punkrockacademyfightsong (1994)
- All Scratched Up! (1996)
- Last of the Sharpshooters (1997)
- Fly the Flag (1999)
- windwardtidesandwaywardsails (2003)
- Champions at Heart (2012)
- All In (2018)
- Lonely Town (2021)
- Crazy Days (2024)

Compilation albums

- Punkrockdays: The Best of Down by Law (2002)

Live albums

- Quick Hits: Live in the Studio (2019)

EPs and splits

- "D.C. Guns" double EP (1993)
- "Down by Law / Pseudo Heroes" split album (2000)
- "Revolution Time" EP (2013)
- "Equators" (split with End of Pipe)(2015)
- "Redoubt" EP (2018)
- "Buried Alive / Rip It Off" (2020)

== Music videos ==
- "Hit or Miss" (1994)
- "I'm Gonna Be (500 Miles)" (1994)
- "Independence Day" (1996)
- "Radio Ragga" (1996)
- "Question Marks & Periods" (1997)

== Compilations ==
- Atticus: Dragging The Lake II
- Punk Vs. Emo
- World Still Won't Listen: Tribute To The Smiths
- Down By Law Vs. Gigantor
- Terror Firmer
- Radio Asylum Vol. 1
- Go-Kart Vs. The Corporate Giant Vol. 2
- Short Music For Short People
- Five Years On The Streets
- Punk-O-Rama Vol. 3
- Before You Were Punk
- Godmoney
- Punk-O-Rama Vol. 2
- Keep The Beat
- Punk-O-Rama Vol. 1
- Chairman Of The Bored: A Tribute To Frank Sinatra
- More Songs About Anger, Fear, Sex & Death
- Digital Snow
- The Big One
