= Testube =

American electronic music project

- Origin: Colorado, United States
- Genres: Industrial; electro-industrial; IDM
- Years active: 1994–present
- Labels: United Endangered Front; DSBP; Glim
- Spinoffs: Danos; Marble I/Orchard
- Spinoff of: Wrack Process
- Members: Jeff Danos
- Past members: Bryan Elsloo
- Website: testube.com

Testube is an American solo electronic music project, founded in 1994 by Jeff Danos (born May 9, 1976). His music spans multiple subgenres of electronic music, including Industrial, Glitch, Experimental, IDM, Electroclash, Darkwave, Ambient, Synthpop and EBM.

== History ==
Testube began in 1994 as a tribal-influenced experimental electronic side-project of the early 1990s Industrial music group Wrack Process. The earliest recordings occurred in 1994–1995 and featured musical contributions from Jeff Danos and Bryan Elsloo. From these early recordings, the two musicians released a self-titled Testube cassette in March 1996 on UEF Records. Following the dissolution of Wrack Process later that year, co-founder Jeff Danos briefly produced solo material under the monikers "Danos" and "Marble I/Orchard". By April 1997, Jeff had re-assumed the Testube moniker for his solo music project. Testube originated in Englewood, Colorado and relocated to Eureka Springs, Arkansas in 2006.

In 2011, Testube released a cover version of Pixies track "Wave of Mutilation" to raise charity donations for the Japanese Red Cross Society in the wake of the 2011 Tōhoku earthquake and tsunami.

In October 2021, Testube released a new song and video titled "Themself" as a charity fundraiser for Cyndi Lauper's True Colors United organization.

== Music charts ==
Reconstructive Surgery, an album of Testube songs remixed by Danos and other artists, appeared on the CMJ national RPM top-20 charts for six weeks in the Autumn of 2000, peaking at the number 4 chart position that September.

== Critical response ==
Australian journal Blatant Propaganda praised Testube's Bioplaza album for its "gothic-medieval melodies and dreamy electronic-body-music". Chain D.L.K. website reviewed Corporation album stating it is "not for the timid or pop oriented, yet still fully functional on the dancefloor!" Regarding Testube's Off-Purpose album, UK-based Sphere Magazine wrote "this collection has personality that cannot be turned off or even ignored." StarVox Webzine proclaimed "Testube are an anomaly. Brilliant beyond measure, and yet criminally overlooked... How does this work, people? How is it that Testube isn't spoken of with the same reverence as Skinny Puppy? The material is that good, let me assure you."

== Remixing ==
Jeff Danos has remixed other electronic music groups, including Torrent Vaccine, Destroid, Ptyl, I, Parasite, Skin Contact, Pain Station, Burikusu!!!, Thine Eyes, Left Spine Down, the Unter Null side-project Stray, Diverje, B! Machine, Monstrum Sepsis, Paranoid Axis, Biopsy, White Trash Compactor, Leæther Strip (for the single Carry Me) and works by fellow Glim Records recording artist LowHero DLL. Jeff's audio post-production is often credited as a Testube "remix" or "treatment".

== Live performance ==
Testube rarely plays in a live context, as it is primarily a studio music project. However, there have been a handful of live performances, the first of which was in 1996 at Cafe Euphrates in Denver, CO. Albuquerque, NM is the only other city to host live shows with Testube.

== Film composing ==
Jeff Danos has contributed original music to motion picture soundtracks, including the cult film Sleeping Pills and the short film Refraction.

== Record labels ==
Testube has been associated with UEF (United Endangered Front) Records (1996–1998), DSBP Records (1999–2007), and Glim Records (starting in 2008).

== Discography ==
Below is a partial Testube discography:

Release title	Artist	Records Label	Format(s)	Release date	Notes
Off Purpose	Testube	Glim Records	CD, digital download	May 2010	
Treatments	Various Artists	Glim Records	CD	Sep 2009	
Covert	Testube	Glim Records	CD	Jul 2008	
Refraction	Testube	ClandestCINE Films	35mm, DVD	Oct 2007	short film
Sleeping Pills	Jeff Danos	Kinotonik Pictures	35mm, DVD	Dec 2003	feature film
Corporation	Testube	DSBP Records	CD	Sep 2003	
Bioplaza Revisited	Testube	DSBP Records	CD	Nov 2000	
Daisypusher EP	Marble I/Orchard	MP3.com	CD, digital download	Aug 2000	
Carry Me (Testube remix)	Leæther Strip	Metropolis Records	CD Single	May 2000	remix
Carry Me (Testube remix)	Leæther Strip	Bloodline Records	CD Single	Mar 2000	remix
Reconstructive Surgery	Testube	DSBP Records	CD	May 2000	reached No. 4 on CMJ RPM chart
Bioplaza	Testube	Self Released	CD	May 1999	
Circuit Noir Vol. 2	Various Artists	UEF Records	CD	Feb 1999	
Vertigo Grim	Testube	UEF Records	CD-R	Sep 1998	
Preyer	Testube	Promo	CD-R	Apr 1998	Promo Only
Circuit Noir Vol. 1	Various Artists	UEF Records	CD	Feb 1998	
Post-Apocalypse	Testube	UEF Records	CD-R	Feb 1998	
Usable Frequency Response	Testube	UEF Records	CD-R, MiniDisc, Cassette	Jul 1997	
Second Soul	Testube	UEF Records	CD-R, MiniDisc, Cassette	Apr 1997	
Soul	Danos	Promo	Cassette	Nov 1996	Promo Only
