= Wednesday Week (band) =

American rock band

- Origin: Los Angeles, California, United States
- Genres: Pop/rock
- Years active: 1983–1990, 1998–present
- Label: Enigma
- Spinoffs: Lucky
- Spinoff of: The Undeclared; Goat Deity; Narrow Adventure
- Members: Kristi Callan; Kelly Callan; David Nolte; Heidi Rodewald
- Past members: David Provost; Tom Alford; Steve Ney; Jennifer Dorfman; John Talley-Jones; Ilene Markell; Karen Blankfeld; Mike Anderson; Jeff Burgess; Russell Chaput; Tracy Elms; John Ferriter "Whitey" Pryor; Tim Edmundson; Rob Hunt
- Website: www.wednesdayweek.com

Wednesday Week is an American rock band formed in Los Angeles, California in 1983. After releasing two albums, the band split up in 1990, with members going on to form Lucky. Since 1998, Wednesday Week has played occasional shows with various lineups consisting of previous members.

== History ==
Founders of the band were the sisters Kristi and Kelly Callan—daughters of actress K Callan. The sisters formed their first group, The Undeclared, in 1979. The duo evolved into a trio, Goat Deity, in 1980, when they were joined by Steve Wynn. Wynn left to concentrate on his other band, The Dream Syndicate, and Kjehl Johansen (of The Urinals) joined on bass guitar, with the band name changing again to Narrow Adventure. With David Provost replacing Johansen in 1983, the band became Wednesday Week (named after the Undertones song), and they released their debut EP, Betsy's House, later that year. Further lineup changes followed, with Provost being replaced by Heidi Rodewald at the end of 1983, and Tom Alford joining on lead guitar in early 1984. In 1985, David Nolte (of The Last) replaced Alford, giving the band its most stable lineup.

The band signed with Enigma Records, releasing the Don Dixon-produced debut album What We Had in 1987. Two songs from the album were featured in the film Slumber Party Massacre II, with actresses in the movie miming to the songs. Towards the end of 1987 Rodewald left, and another former Urinals member, John Talley-Jones, joined as one of a string of short-lived members before the band split up in 1990. Before splitting up they self-released a second album, No Going Back on cassette only.

After Wednesday Week, Kelly Callan joined Gregg Turner's post-Angry Samoans band, The Mistaken, which released an album, Santa Fe, in 1993 on Triple X Records. In 1995, the Callan sisters and Nolte (who married Kristi Callan) formed Lucky with former Mad Parade and Action Now bassist Mike Lawrence. Lucky released the album Live A Little in 1996 on Temple Bar Records. Nolte and Kristi Callan also played in David Gray's band. Kristi Callan later formed the band Dime Box, releasing the album Five and Dime Waltz in 2008, and Happy in 2019. Rodewald later joined The Negro Problem with Mark "Stew" Stewart, with whom she created the Tony Award-winning musical Passing Strange.

Since 1998, Wednesday Week play occasional live shows with various combinations of past members, with the Callan sisters and Nolte as core members.

== Discography ==
=== Albums ===
- What We Had (1987), Enigma
- No Going Back (1990), Sweden Spins (cassette only)
- What We Had (Reissue w/ additional tracks, 2008), Noble Rot

=== EPs ===
- Betsy's House (1983), WarFrat Grammophone

=== Singles ===
- "Missionary" (1986), Enigma
- "Why" (1986), Enigma
- "It's a Steal"/"Special" (1989), P2PR/Unhinged – flexi-disc released with Unhinged fanzine
- "The Senses of Our World" (1997)
