= Punkrockacademyfightsong =

Studio album by Down by Law
- Released: 1994
- Studio: A&M
- Genres: Punk rock; melodic hardcore
- Length: 46:27
- Label: Epitaph
- Producer: Michael W. Douglass

Down by Law chronology
Blue (1992)	Punkrockacademyfightsong (1994)	All Scratched Up (1996)

Punkrockacademyfightsong is the third album by American punk rock band Down by Law, released in 1994. It contains a cover of the Proclaimers' hit song "I'm Gonna Be (500 Miles)". Singer Dave Smalley considered it the band's best known album.

== Production ==
The album was produced by Michael Douglass. It was recorded at A&M Studios, in Hollywood, California. Down by Law was in the studio at the same time as the Rolling Stones; the Stones allegedly complained about the volume of the band's punk rock.

== Critical reception ==
Professional ratings
Review scores
Source	Rating
AllMusic	4/5 stars
Punk Planet	Favorable

The Chicago Reader labeled the album "punk as pabulum," and considered the band an "alternative-rock Raffi." The Las Vegas Review-Journal deemed it "19 terse, incisive tunes that epitomize the California sound." The Boston Herald opined: "Fast and loud, yet marvelously melodic, Down By Law takes punk to a new level and proves it can be more than just angry noise."

AllMusic called the album "a solid, polished album of raw punk rock."

== Track listing ==
1. "Punk Won" (Phillips, Smalley) – 2:57
2. "Hit Or Miss" (Smalley) – 3:22
3. "Flower Tattoo" (Oswald) – 1:20
4. "Sympathy For The World" (Oswald) – 3:15
5. "I'm Gonna Be (500 Miles)" (Reid) – 4:04
6. "Brief Tommy" – 0:05
7. "Bright Green Globe" (Smalley) – 3:37
8. "Minusame" (Oswald, Williams) – 2:25
9. "Drummin' Dave, Hunter Up" (Oswald) – 0:30
10. "Punk As Fuck" (Smalley) – 1:34
11. "1944" (Smalley) – 3:56
12. "The King & I" (Oswald) – 2:16
13. "Haircut" (Smalley) – 2:21
14. "Chocolate Jerk" (Oswald) – 1:51
15. "Sam I" (Oswald) – 1:08
16. "Heroes & Hooligans" (Oswald, Smalley) – 3:29
17. "Soldier Boy" (Smalley) – 3:59
18. "Goodnight Song" (Smalley) – 3:51
19. "Sam II" (Oswald) – 0:27

== Personnel ==
- Dave Smalley – Vocals, guitar
- Hunter Oswald – Drums, vocals
- "Angry" John Di Mambro – Bass
- Sam Williams III – Lead guitar
