= Resipiscent =

- Founded: 2005
- Founder: James Decker; Thomas Day
- Genre: Experimental, noise
- Country of origin: U.S.
- Location: San Francisco, California
- Official website: www.resipiscent.com

Resipiscent is an independent record label based in San Francisco California. The label was founded in 2005 by James Decker and Thomas Day.

The label publishes a wide range of experimental music and film. Most of its releases are extremely limited editions involving handcrafted package art. Liz Allbee's "Quarry Tones" release is packaged in heavy hand-sewn felt with flowers and shredded circuits scattered inside. Smegma's Live 91-93 relies on dumpster-dived mainstream CDs that the band then defaces to serve as packaging. The Anti-Ear Tre Picoli release appears to be a 7-inch record but contains two mini-CDs and one mini-DVD. Aaartfystte's 22 Short Noise Videos comes in a four-color silkscreen package embellished with hand-carved relief prints by Maw Zuffler. The double CD compilation String of Artifacts requires listeners to solve a word jumble and then a crossword puzzle in order to decode the track listing, with some bands adding to the puzzle by imitating the style of other bands. The Bran(...)Pos "Quaak Muttar" package is a crude but functional pinball machine for which track indexes serve as scoreboard.

The label name revives a word that had fallen into disuse. "Resipiscent" means "a return to one's senses following a brutal experience". Its tagline is "Unburying the meanest in criminally obscure sound."

== Roster ==
- 0th
- Aaartfystte
- Anti-Ear
- At Jennie Richie
- Audrey Chen
- Ava Mendoza
- Black Mayonnaise
- Bran(...)Pos
- Cactus
- Core of the Coalman (Jorge Boehringer)
- Critical Monkey
- Earwicker
- Fat Worm of Error
- Hans Grusel's Krankenkabinet
- Kenta Nagai
- Liz Allbee
- Loachfillet
- Masonic Youth
- Midmight
- Miya Masaoka
- Nerfbau
- Noel Von Harmonson
- Occasional Detroit
- Peter B
- Porest
- The Ritualistic School of Errors
- Scott Arford
- SIXES
- skozey fetish
- Smegma
- Tarantism
- Xome, Tralphaz, Eco Morti

== See also ==
- List of record labels
