= The Schoolhouse =

Public School Building

Coordinates: 42.344985°N 72.596067°W

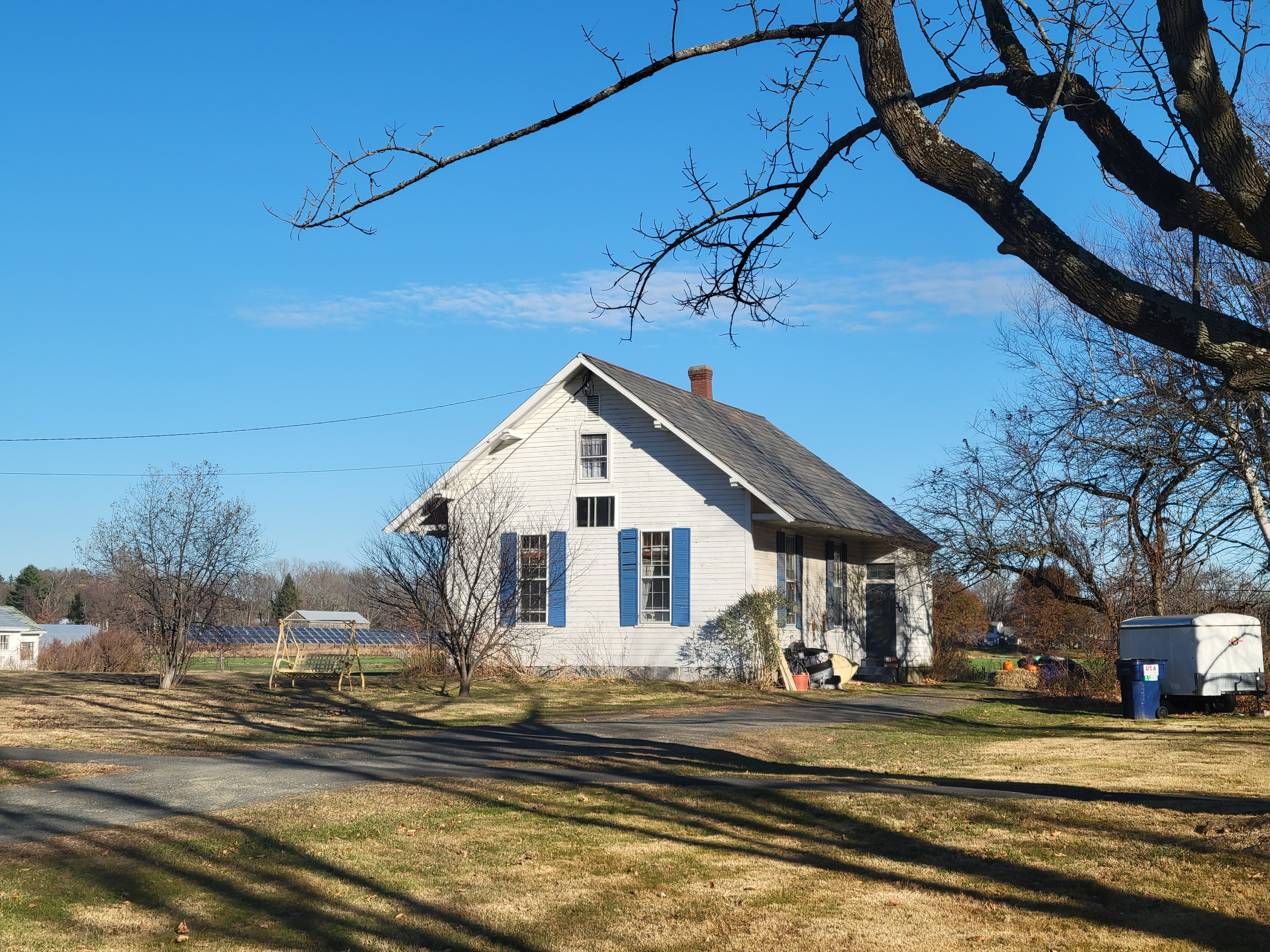
30 West Street in Hadley, Massachusetts

The Schoolhouse is a mid-19th century public school building that was used as a performance space from 2001 to 2005. It is located at 30 West Street in the farming town of Hadley in the Pioneer Valley of Western Massachusetts. The building was originally referred to as "Hadley District School House No. 2".

When the space was in use as a performance space it was colloquially referred to as "The Schoolhouse". While in operation, the space hosted a variety of experimental and avant-garde music events featuring local, national, and international artists. Over this period, The Schoolhouse became a major venue in the noise, freak folk, and New Weird America scenes of the mid-aughts.

== Layout ==
The first floor layout of The Schoolhouse

The Schoolhouse was originally constructed as a one room school building in the middle of the 19th century. The main performance area at the space was in the original classroom of the building. Two-thirds of the wall space in the room were still covered with chalkboards. Performances in this space were described as having a "homey atmosphere cos it's their living room." At some point, there was a second floor addition to the building's original structured that, according to resident George Myers, was "hastilly added" and "very poorly insulated." During The Schoolhouse's run, the second floor included a recording studio/practice room housed in a closet where, again according to Myers, "everything was recorded with very, very bad equipment." The second floor also contained two bedrooms and an attic-like space that was often used for storage or as a guest bedroom. The attic-like space was once used for a performance/installation by The Doo Man Group, because of space restrictions the performance was simulcast throughout the house from hand held video cameras to televisions in the main performance space.

== Notable performances ==
On Sunday, May 23, 2004, a veritable avant-garde supergroup performed at The Schoolhouse when Brooklyn drone-artists Double Leopards were joined by Sonic Youth’s Thurston Moore, noted independent music producer and Wilco/Sonic Youth collaborator Jim O'Rourke, and free jazz duo Paul Flaherty & Chris Corsano all performing together under the name Double Dream/Action Leopards Unit. Openers that night included noise band Yellow Swans from Portland, Oregon, San Francisco's Sharon Cheslow, Scott Foust’s Idea Fire Company, and Western Massachusetts’ avant-pop trio Yonk Yonk.

In October 2002, Western Massachusetts experimental art-rock band Fat Worm of Error played their first show at the Schoolhouse.

Other performers at The Schoolhouse include: Animental, Anthro Rex, Barn Owl, Belltone Suicide, Bengeorge7, Bromp Treb, Can't, Casiotone for the Painfully Alone, Cass McCombs, Cherry Blossoms, Chiara Giovando, Deerhunter, Deflator Mouse, Defneg, Dreamhouse, Dredd Foole, Dude Law, Emil Beaulieau (aka Ron Lessard of RRRecords), Feathers, Hands, Horse Spirit Penetrates, Jason Anderson, Jimmy Cousins, John Wiese, Johnny Franchise and the Merchandise, Jonny Corndawg, Joshua Burkett, Kites, Lazy Magnet, M Ax Noi Mach, Mammal, Misty, Movies With Live Soundtracks, Mr. Uterus, Neon Hunk, Paul and Val, Rave Party, Red Favorite, Rustle, Schurt Kwitters, Scientifics, Sharon Cheslow, Son Of Earth, Steamrollers, Steve Zultanski, Summer Jam Band, Tarp, Tiger Saw, USAIsAMonster, Vampire Belt (Bill Nace & Chris Corsano) w/ Thurston Moore and various Paperrad musical performances and installation projects such as Extreme Animals, Dr. Doo, Doo Man Group, and schoolhouse rave.

== Breaking World Records ==
In addition to hosting noise and experimental music shows, The Schoolhouse served as headquarters for the Breaking World Records label. Originally conceived as a cassette tape and cd-r label, Breaking World Records grew to eventually releasing LP and 7” vinyl records (in addition to still putting out cassettes). Breaking World Records became a significant vehicle for documenting the noise music scene in Western Massachusetts during the period putting out releases by bengeorge7, Anthro Rex, Noise Nomads, Yonk Yonk, Diagram A, Tumblecat Poof Poofy Poof, and Grey Skull.

Other notable Breaking World Record’s releases include the first Ducktails 7" (side project of Real Estate (band) guitar player Matt Mondanile), Paperrad musical component Dr. Doo In Fucland CD-r/DVD-r, and Fat Worm of Error side projects’ Bromp Treb Twins 7” and Schwurt Kwitters s/t cdr.

== Western Massachusetts ==
The Schoolhouse existed during a particularly fruitful period in the independent, do-it-yourself music and art scene in Western Massachusetts. In addition to the Schoolhouse, underground and left-of-center shows were also regularly booked at the Flywheel Arts Collective (a non-profit performing arts space) in Easthampton, MA, The Shed (a “punkspot” literally housed in a backyard toolshed) in Palmer, MA, as well as the formation of the Autonomous Battleship Collective (a psych/folk collective) operating mainly out of the Montague Bookmill in Montague, MA. In addition to these collectives, Byron Coley and Thurston Moore's Ecstatic Yod record and bookstore in Florence, MA also hosted a number performances by different national and international acts.

In an interview with Blastitude webzine in 2004, Fat Worm of Error’s Neil “Kayleen” Young said, “Western Mass benefits from being far enough away from NYC & Boston that some of the more fashionable elements overlook us, plus we don't have either of their wretched regional accents… However, we do benefit from being in close enough proximity for touring folks to pass on through, and a nice little circuit has been from Boston - Providence - Western Mass - Brattleboro, VT - Albany/Troy, NY - New Haven, CT - NYC.”

In a 2010 interview with Pitchfork, when asked by contributor Marc Masters why so much interesting stuff goes on in Western Massachusetts, Tim Sheldon of Fat Worm of Error responded, “It’s confusing to us sometimes.”
