= Dave Naz =

American photographer (born 1969)

Dave Nazworthy
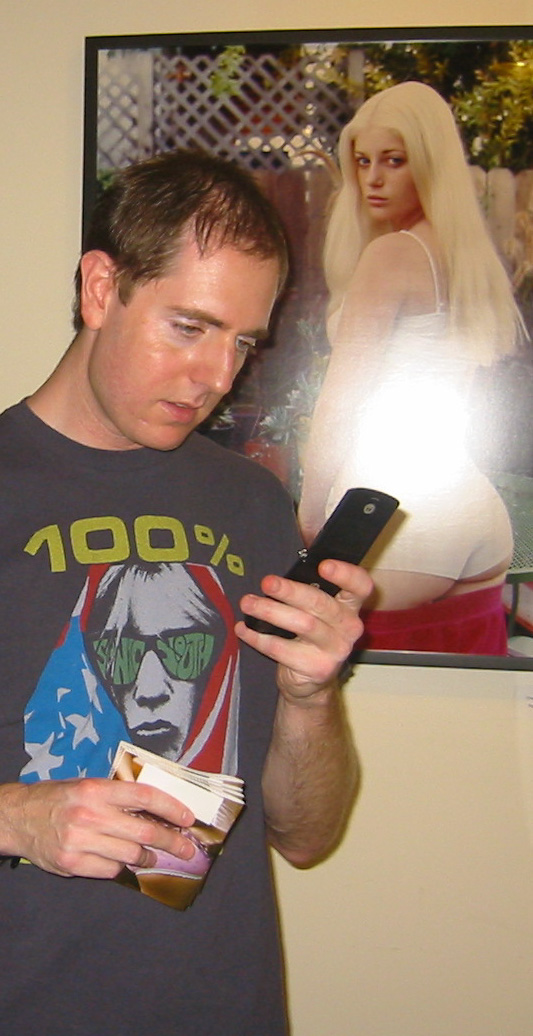
- Naz at the book release party for his FRESH: Girls of Seduction, held at the Artist Bound Gallery in downtown Los Angeles, June 2006
- Born: September 2, 1969 (age 57)
- Known for: Photography

Dave Naz (born September 2, 1969) is an American photographer and film director.

== Career ==
From 1985 up to 1997, Naz played in the punk rock bands Chemical People, Down by Law, and The Last.

Inspired by artists such as Larry Clark, Nan Goldin and Diane Arbus, Naz started photographing people in sexual situations. In 2001, Naz assisted photographer Richard Kern and went on to shoot for a number of adult magazines, including Hustler, Taboo, Leg Show and Barely Legal. Several of Naz's photos are used in the artwork of American painter and photographer Richard Prince.

== Personal life ==
As of 2015, Naz was married to Ashley Blue.

== Bibliography ==
- (2025) BTS - (Foreword by Eric Kroll). Friend Editions
- (2024) Naked Girls with Small Breasts 2 - Edition Reuss ISBN 978-3-943105-72-8
- (2024) Dressed Undressed 3 - Edition Reuss ISBN 978-3-943105-69-8
- (2023) Dressed Undressed 2 - Edition Reuss ISBN 978-3-943105-66-7
- (2022) Legs. Nylons. Nudes - Edition Reuss ISBN 978-3-943105-63-6
- (2021) Dressed Undressed - Edition Reuss ISBN 3943105598
- (2019) Naked Girls with Small Breasts - Edition Reuss ISBN 3943105555
- (2018) Natural - Issue, Inc. ISBN 0974512451
- (2017) Identity: In & Beyond The Binary - Rare Bird Books, A Barnacle Book. ISBN 1945572515
- (2014) Genderqueer: And Other Gender Identities - (Essays by Morty Diamond, Jiz Lee, Sarah B. Burghauser, Ignacio Rivera, Jenny Factor). Rare Bird Books, A Barnacle Book. ISBN 1940207266
- (2011) Butt Babes - (Foreword by Lydia Lunch). Goliath Press. ISBN 3-936709-45-9
- (2010) A.S.L. - Edition Reuss ISBN 978-3-934020-84-9
- (2007) L.A. Bondage - (Foreword by Eric Kroll). Goliath Press. ISBN 3-936709-28-9
- (2006) Fresh: Girls Of Seduction - (Foreword by Mat Gleason). Goliath Press. ISBN 3-936709-19-X
- (2004) Legs - (Foreword by Nina Hartley). Goliath Press. ISBN 3-936709-12-2
- (2003) Panties - (Foreword by Lydia Lunch). Goliath Press. ISBN 3-936709-01-7
- (2002) Lust Circus - (Foreword by Tony Mitchell). Goliath Press.ISBN 3980760278

== Exhibitions ==
- (2015) Identity - University of Redlands Art Gallery (Redlands, CA)
- (2014) Identity - Coagula Curatorial (Los Angeles, CA)
- (2009) Candids - Perihelion Arts Gallery (Phoenix, AZ)
- (2007) Candids - Todd/Browning Gallery (Los Angeles, CA)
- (2005) Legs - Clair Obscur Gallery (Los Angeles, CA)
- (2004) Legs - Sometimes Madness is Wisdom Gallery (Los Angeles, CA)
- (2003) Panties - Perihelion Arts Gallery (Phoenix, AZ)
- (2002) Lust Circus - Stormy Leather Gallery (San Francisco, CA)
- (2002) Lust Circus - Curated by Mat Gleason, Coagula Gallery (Los Angeles, CA)

== Partial filmography ==
- (2015) "Identity: In & Beyond The Binary"
- (2012) "Waking Up"
- (2011) Slave 06 (JM Productions)
- (2010) F. M. Indie (Private Media Group)
- (2010) Turbo Rock (Good Releasing)
- (2009) Cheating Hollywood Wives (Private Media Group)
- (2009) L.A. Girls Love... (Private Media Group)
- (2008) Sugar Town (Vivid-Alt)
- (2008) Circa '82 (Vivid-Alt)
- (2008) House of Sex & Domination (Private Media Group)
- (2008) L.A. Lust (Private Media Group)
- (2006) Skater Girl Fever (Vivid-Alt)

== Awards ==
- 2009 AVN Award Winner – Best Best BDSM Release (House of Sex & Domination - Private Media Group)
- 2009 Ninfa Award Winner for Best BDSM Film (House of Sex & Domination - Private Media Group)
