= All Scratched Up! =

Studio album by Down by Law
- Released: March 12, 1996
- Genres: Punk rock, melodic hardcore
- Length: 46:51
- Label: Epitaph

Down by Law chronology
Punkrockacademyfightsong (1994)	All Scratched Up! (1996)	Last of the Sharpshooters (1997)

All Scratched Up! is the fourth album by punk rock band Down by Law, released on March 12, 1996, by Epitaph Records The band supported the album by touring with labelmates Millencolin.

The vinyl pressing of the album was released as a double album, with Side D consisting of vinyl-only bonus tracks. Three songs on the album ("True Believers", "Post Office Lament", and "True Music", one per vinyl side) end with different performances of a short song called "Counting Crows Must Die", with Side D ending in seven different versions of the song.

== Critical reception ==
Professional ratings
Review scores
Source	Rating
AllMusic	4/5 stars
Rock Hard	8.0/10
The Tampa Tribune	2/4 stars

The Chicago Tribune wrote that Down by Law "blends punk and pop with knowing ease but without a whole lot of flair." The Bradenton Herald determined that "musically, 'Radio Ragga' (a melancholy reggae number) and 'Far And Away' (the catchy melody switches motifs to rolling drums and stretched guitar sounds a la The Who, then back again) are most interesting." The Tampa Tribune thought that "the band dabbles in dime-store punk and tuneless wonk with limited success."

== Track listing ==
No.	Title	Length
1.	"Independence Day"	1:13
2.	"Cheap Trill"	2:52
3.	"All American"	1:58
4.	"Hell Song"	3:09
5.	"True Believers"	2:31
6.	"Giving It All Away"	3:30
7.	"Gruesome Gary"	3:02
8.	"Radio Ragga"	4:41
9.	"Attention: Anyone"	0:14
10.	"Superman"	3:02
11.	"Post Office Lament"	1:28
12.	"Ivory Girl"	2:49
13.	"No Has Beens"	2:37
14.	"Kevin's Song"	3:22
15.	"True Music"	2:54
16.	"Far and Away"	4:06
17.	"Punks and Drunks"	3:21
Total length:		46:49

Vinyl edition bonus tracks

No.	Title	Length
1.	"Daily Occurence [sic]"	3:08
2.	"Neon Skies"	2:34
3.	"Going Underground" (Originally by the Jam)	3:18
4.	"Dag Punk"	2:18
5.	"World Without Me"	3:32
6.	"Green Hills of Virginia"	2:51
7.	"Counting Crows Must Die" (Different recordings of the same song back-to-back)	2:50
Total length:		20:31
