= Giant Records (independent) =

Giant Records was an independent record label, formed in 1987 under the Dutch East India Trading umbrella run by Steev Riccardo, based in Long Island, New York. Giant was dedicated to punk rock groups, such as Dag Nasty and Uniform Choice.

== Artists ==
- 7 Seconds
- Anna Domino
- Cabaret Voltaire
- Dag Nasty
- Government Issue
- Indestructible Noise Command
- Marginal Man
- Uniform Choice
- Verbal Assault

== See also ==
- List of record labels
