= Last of the Sharpshooters =

Studio album by Down by Law
- Released: August 26, 1997
- Genre: Punk rock
- Label: Epitaph

Down by Law chronology
All Scratched Up (1996)	Last of the Sharpshooters (1997)	Fly the Flag (1999)

Last of the Sharpshooters is an album by Down by Law. It was released by Epitaph in 1997.

It received mostly positive reviews.

== Track listing ==
1. "USA Today"
2. "No Equalizer"
3. "Call To Arms"
4. "Guns Of '96"
5. "Get Out"
6. "Burning Heart"
7. "Question Marks & Periods"
8. "Urban Napalm"
9. "D.J.G."
10. "Concrete Times"
11. "No One Gets Away"
12. "The Last Goodbye"
13. "Factory Day"
14. "The Cool Crowd"
15. "Self-Destruction"
