= Windwardtidesandwaywardsails =

Studio album by Down by Law
- Released: June 5, 2003
- Recorded: GL Studios, Tampa, Florida.
- Genre: Punk rock
- Length: 36:30
- Label: Union Records
- Producer: Sam Williams III

Down by Law chronology
Punkrockdays: The Best of Down by Law (2002)	Windwardtidesandwaywardsails (2003)	Champions at Heart (2012)

Professional ratings
Review scores
Source	Rating
AllMusic	3/5 stars
Drowned in Sound	8/10
Punknews.org	3/5 stars

Windwardtidesandwaywardsails is an album by Down by Law, released in 2003. It marked the first time since 1992's Blue that the same drummer played on two consecutive albums.

== Track listing ==
All tracks are written by Dave Smalley and Sam Williams, except where noted.

No.	Title	Length
1.	"Next To Go" (Keith Davies, Smalley)	2:15
2.	"Put The Boots In" (Smalley)	2:19
3.	"Capitol Riots"	3:29
4.	"Convoluted" (Smalley)	2:07
5.	"Superheroes Wanted"	2:51
6.	"Going Wrong"	1:56
7.	"(I Wanna Be In) AC/DC" (Smalley)	3:50
8.	"Kickdown"	2:17
9.	"Baked With Sublime" (Smalley)	2:03
10.	"8th And Main" (Davies)	3:38
11.	"Easy Street"	1:50
12.	"Johnny Law"	2:31
13.	"Everlasting Girl"	1:32
14.	"Accelerator"	3:57
Total length:		36:30
