= Sleeping Pills (film) =

2003 film by Michael Lauter

- Directed by: Michael Lauter
- Written by: Michael Lauter
- Produced by: Michael Lauter; Crista Giuliani; Jonathan Chalker
- Starring: Jonathan Chalker; Lea Downey; Melissa London
- Cinematography: Michael Lauter
- Edited by: Michael Lauter
- Music by: Testube; Cute Yet Creepy; Penetrator; Michael Lauter; Multicast
- Release date: December 4, 2003 (U.S.)
- Running time: 85 minutes
- Country: United States
- Language: English
- Budget: $108,000

Sleeping Pills is a 2003 American drama film written and directed by Michael Lauter, which tells the story of a young man who struggles to find his place in an ephemeral landscape.

== Plot ==
Tarika, a supposed expert in applied probability, gets a job with a cutting-edge transportation company, Dymotran (Dynamic Modular Transportation), and develops a romantic interest in his attractive new boss and EVP, Charlotte. Having presented himself to his new employers as a square-toed professional, Tarika is embarrassed when Charlotte discovers that his closest friends are playful misfits with little to no professional aspirations. In spite of apparent compatibility issues, Tarika and Charlotte begin to develop a relationship. Tarika reconsiders his choice of friends after his on-again off-again love interest, Tricia, makes out with Kevin, his close friend and proverbial ringmaster, during a surreal birthday party in a kitschy Mexican restaurant (complete with cliff divers and Mariachi bands).

Tarika struggles to decide which life suits him best and as is his tendency, develops somewhat of an over-attachment to Charlotte. After an untimely marriage proposal to Charlotte, who is focused on her career and not ready to settle down, Tarika is dumped. In his bitterness and hurt, Tarika resigns from work on Dymotran's sustaining project, the development of a futuristic, modular transportation system. This places Charlotte and her company in jeopardy and Charlotte confronts Tarika in the parking lot as he leaves the office for the last time. This encounter erupts into a full-blown screaming match and eventually ends with Charlotte admitting that she loves Tarika. After a final plea from Charlotte for Tarika to reconsider his decision, he agrees to give two more weeks to the job and in return, Charlotte agrees to be open-minded about a future with Tarika.

Taking breaks from his final work on the project, Tarika visits many buildings and public spaces of 60's and 70's Modernist origin, the architecture and design of which serves as inspiration for much of his work. At every turn, another one of these spaces is boarded up and bulldozed. This builds upon the predominant theme of Sleeping Pills, whereby the entities and images forming one's identity are crushed without remorse in favor of new and improved versions. These images serve as a metaphor for the ephemeral home, relationship, and sense of self that can be seen as a consequence of a Postmodern society.

Tarika is reunited with the old gang for a final roller skating session at the FunPlex, a large roller rink and game arcade scheduled for demolition the following week. Soon after, Tarika meets up with Tricia at the courtyard of their old high school (an odd building with no windows), where Tricia reveals that she is leaving the area for good and asks Tarika to run away with her.

The plot culminates with Tarika having to make a decision to either run away with the unpredictable and fun Tricia or stay and attempt to build a life with a more stable, yet seemingly incompatible Charlotte.

== Cast ==
Actor	Role
Jonathan Chalker	Tarika
Lea Downey	Charlotte
Melissa London	Tricia
James Compton	Kevin
Jennifer Kirchenbauer	Kimberly
Jeff Danos	Abortion
Lindsay McDonald	Amber
Ari Greenberg	David

== Location and timeline ==
Sleeping Pills was shot in Denver and surrounding suburbs, including Thornton and Littleton (where the notorious Columbine High School massacre took place). Shooting began May 1999 with completion of principal photography in November 1999 and completion of second unit filming in February 2000. Post-production was completed in October 2003 and the film premiered at The Cairo International Film Festival the same month. The North American premier was December 4, 2003 in Denver. Since then, the film has been shown in limited circulation in theaters around the US.

Over half of the building locations where Sleeping Pills was shot have been demolished, including Bigg's Hypermarket and Villa Italia Shopping Mall, a fact which gives emphasis to the film's underlying theme.

== Reception and status ==
A small film by most motion picture standards (about $100K was spent on the film), Sleeping Pills opened with little publicity and has not been picked up for mass distribution. The film was an Official Selection of The Cairo International Film Festival.
