= Bloody Mannequin Orchestra =

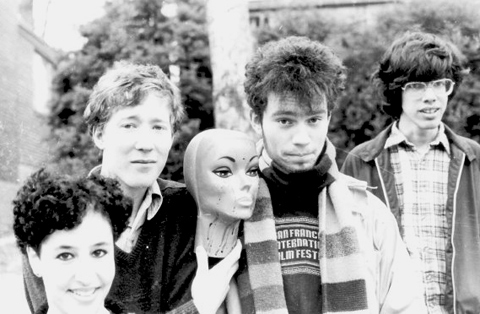

Background information
- Origin: Bethesda, Maryland, U.S.
- Genres: Art punk • post-hardcore • no wave
- Years active: 1982–1985
- Labels: WGNS Recordings, EPU Records
- Past members: Alex Mahoney; Sharon Cheslow; Roger Marbury; Colin Sears; Charles Bennington

Bloody Mannequin Orchestra were an influential early 1980s punk band from Bethesda, Maryland. They formed around a small, but active, scene at Bethesda-Chevy Chase High School and were part of the larger D.C hardcore community. The band members were Colin Sears, Roger Marbury, Alex Mahoney, Sharon Cheslow and Charles Bennington.

Cheslow had been in Chalk Circle, "the first all-female band to emerge from harDCore," before Bloody Mannequin Orchestra was created. Sears and Marbury went on to form the mid-1980s Revolution Summer era Dischord Records band Dag Nasty with Brian Baker of Minor Threat.

Bloody Mannequin Orchestra released a few cassettes and the Roadmap to Revolution LP on WGNS, a label started by Sears, Cheslow, and Geoff Turner (who was later a member in the band Gray Matter). Cheslow and Sears also published the fanzine If This Goes On. Bloody Mannequin Orchestra, like other bands to come out of Bethesda, were known for their smart, playful music with a political consciousness. In a review of Roadmap to Revolution for the magazine MRR, Ruth Schwartz wrote that the unique "hard-edged" and "art-damaged" music utilized different instruments and styles, and featured "eclectic lyrics that parody soldiers, heads of state, and people that think they're cool."

== Members ==
- Charles Bennington – vocals, saxophone
- Alex Mahoney – vocals, guitars, keyboards
- Sharon Cheslow – guitars, keyboards, drums, percussion, vocals
- Roger Marbury – bass, vocals
- Colin Sears – drums, percussion, vocals

== Discography ==
- Roadmap to Revolution 12" (1984, WGNS/EPU)
- Streetlights in the Dark tape (1985, WGNS)

Compilation appearances

- "Paper Cut", "Bloody Mannequin" and "Man in Glass" – We Gots No Station (1984)
- "Streets of Saigon" and "Oh Yeah" – The Halloween Cassette (1985)
- 13 songs – "Timeclock Equals Hole In Head" (1985)
