= Food for Thought/Take It Back =

Compilation album by Gray Matter
- Released: 1990
- Recorded: November 1984; August 1985
- Studio: Inner Ear
- Genre: Post-hardcore; emo; Hardcore Punk
- Length: 52:55
- Language: English
- Label: Dischord
- Producer: Ian MacKaye

Food for Thought/Take It Back is a compilation album by American post-hardcore band Gray Matter.

== Overview ==
Food for Thought/Take It Back consists of Gray Matter's remastered material that combines, in its entirety, the 1985 Food for Thought studio album (Note: Dischord #DIS 48) and the six-song 1986 Take It Back EP; (Note: Dischord #DIS 21) plus three bonus tracks: two previously unreleased demo recordings, and the first version of "Walk the Line", originally featured on Alive & Kicking, a various artists 7-inch EP compiled in 1985 by WGNS Recordings. (Note: WGNS #DM-5023)

== Production ==
Food for Thought was recorded at Inner Ear Studios in Arlington, Virginia in November 1984, while Take It Back was recorded in August 1985, also at Inner Ear. The bonus tracks were recorded at WGNS Studios, also located in Arlington.

== Release ==
Food for Thought/Take It Back was released by Dischord Records in 1990, on CD (Note: Dischord #DIS 49) and cassette tape. (Note: Dischord #DIS 48C)

== Track listing ==
All tracks are written by Gray Matter, except where noted

Food for Thought
No.	Title	Writer(s)	Length
1.	"Retrospect"		2:08
2.	"Oscars Eye"		2:52
3.	"Fill a Void"		2:02
4.	"Give Me a Clue"		3:15
5.	"Gray Matter"		1:15
6.	"Caffeine Blues"		3:36
7.	"Crisis and Compromise"		2:04
8.	"Flash in Time"		1:45
9.	"Phobias"		1:31
10.	"I Am the Walrus" (The Beatles cover)	John Lennon, Paul McCartney	6:19

Take It Back EP
No.	Title	Length
11.	"Chutes and Ladders"	2:26
12.	"Burn No Bridges"	2:39
13.	"Walk the Line"	2:37
14.	"Take It Back"	3:17
15.	"4 A.M."	2:17
16.	"Head"	7:23

Bonus tracks
No.	Title	Length
17.	"Phobias" (demo version)	1:39
18.	"The Spy" (demo version)	0:59
19.	"Walk the Line" (original version)	2:51
Total length:		52:55

== Personnel ==
=== Gray Matter ===
- Geoff Turner (credited as Jeff Turner) – vocals, guitar
- Mark Haggerty – lead guitar
- Steve Niles – bass, backing vocals (tracks 11 to 16)
- Dante Ferrando – drums

=== Additional performers ===
- Amy Pickering – backing vocals (1 to 10)
- Ian MacKaye – backing vocals (1 to 10)
- Skeeter Thompson – backing vocals (1 to 10)
- John Kirschten – backing vocals (1 to 10)
- Molly Burnham – backing vocals (1 to 10)

=== Production ===
- Gray Matter – production (1 to 10, 17 to 19)
- Ian MacKaye – production (1 to 16)
- Bert Queiroz – production (1 to 10)
- Don Zientara – engineering
- Linda Tobin – illustration (front cover)
- Liz Goodman – photography (back cover)
