= Can I Say =

Studio album by Dag Nasty
- Released: June 1986
- Recorded: March 1986
- Genre: Hardcore punk; melodic hardcore; emo
- Length: 24:11 (original); 39:35 (reissue)
- Label: Dischord
- Producer: Ian MacKaye, Dag Nasty

Dag Nasty chronology
Can I Say (1986)	Wig Out at Denko's (1987)

Professional ratings
Review scores
Source	Rating
AllMusic	3/5 stars

Can I Say is the debut album by the American melodic hardcore band Dag Nasty, originally released on June 1, 1986 on Dischord Records. It is the band's first album to feature vocalist Dave Smalley, replacing original vocalist Shawn Brown.

== Music and lyrics ==
Musically, Can I Say is a hardcore punk and melodic hardcore album. According to Ned Raggett of AllMusic: "Baker's roots in Minor Threat are clear throughout, but at the same time, the production, assisted by Ian Mackaye, is actually stronger and crisper than much of that band's work." The album occasionally incorporates call-and-response vocals. Raggett said that frontman Dave Smalley "has a vocal delivery halfway between strident pronouncement and anguished reflection -- it's not emo in the original sense of the term (or alternately the late-90s watering down of same), but it's a careful balance just the same."

Lyrical themes explored on the album include the personal politics of Smalley. Original vocalist Brown would later claim to have written nearly all of the lyrics, as he had recorded songs from the album with the band before being replaced by Smalley.

== Reception and legacy ==
Ned Raggett of AllMusic gave the album three and a half stars out of five, and wrote: "Can I Say helps mark a turning point between hardcore's straight-ahead origins and a more accessible approach that would eventually prime the way for punk's breakthrough in the mid-'90s."

The album was remastered and re-released on CD with six bonus songs in 2002.

The album would prove influential to the emerging emo genre due to its mix of hardcore intensity and melodically sung choruses. "Circles" appeared on a best-of emo songs list by Vulture and was featured in the soundtrack of the videogame Tony Hawk's Proving Ground.

On October 19, 2010, the band released Dag With Shawn, featuring original vocalist Shawn Brown. Originally recorded and meant to be released in 1985, the recording was shelved after Brown was replaced by Smalley. Dag With Shawn features eight of the original tracks and one of the CD reissue bonus tracks from Can I Say, all featuring Brown.

Blink-182 drummer Travis Barker has the phrase "can I say" tattooed on his chest as a tribute to the album, which he has said is one of his favorites.

== Track listing ==
All tracks by Dag Nasty.
Side one

1. "Values Here" – 2:23
2. "One to Two" – 2:15
3. "Circles" – 2:46
4. "Thin Line" – 2:30
5. "Justification" – 2:51

Side two

1. "What Now?" – 2:16
2. "I've Heard" – 1:43
3. "Under Your Influence" – 2:36
4. "Can I Say" – 1:59
5. "Never Go Back" – 2:52

=== 2002 CD reissue bonus tracks ===
1. "Another Wrong" – 2:18
2. "My Dog's a Cat" – 2:19
3. "I've Heard (Live)" – 2:18
4. "Another Wrong (Live)" – 2:22
5. "Trying (Live)" – 2:09
6. "Justification (Live)" – 3:58

Live tracks are from the February 6, 1986 show at The Electric Banana in Pittsburgh, PA.

== Personnel ==
- Dag Nasty
  - Dave Smalley - vocals
  - Brian Baker - guitars
  - Roger Marbury - bass guitar
  - Colin Sears - drums
- Ian MacKaye - producer
- Dag Nasty - producer
