= Eric Kroll =

American photographer (born 1946)

- Born: Eric David Kroll; October 23, 1946 (age 79); New York City, U.S.
- Education: Bard College
- Known for: Photography

Eric David Kroll (born October 23, 1946) is an American portrait and fetish photographer, photojournalist, erotica historian, and book editor.

== Work ==
Eric Kroll's commercial work began in Taos, New Mexico in 1969, when he partnered with friend Sam Bruskin to open a gallery. He worked as a photo journalist in New York from 1971 to 1994.

Kroll worked and lived in many worlds at once; fashion, music, and the art and film scenes. During the 70s and 80s he photographed every day scenes from his personal life, photographed celebrities, fashion and the New York social scene for Elle Magazine, Vogue, The New York Times and Der Spiegel. He photographed personalities and artists such as Madonna, Andy Warhol, Keith Haring, and Korean video artist Nam June Paik. In 1976 he published "Sex Objects," with a grant from the New York State Council of the Arts grant, a book documenting sex workers across America. Artist Richard Prince appropriated an image from the iconic book "Sex Objects" in one of his works that sold for around $2 million.

In the early 1980s he turned away from portrait photography with a series title "Fetish Girls" (1994), which remains one of the best selling books in the publisher Taschen's history. Kroll worked with Benedikt Taschen from 1993 to 2007 as photo editor and erotica historian.

Eric Kroll has published collections ("Fetish Girls" and "Beauty Parade"), composed introductions for influential works such as the compiled two-volume "Bizarre" collection and some Taschen folios. Many of Kroll's photographs refer to and pay homage to his predecessors Weegee and Bunny Yeager as well as Eric Stanton and John Willie. Kroll's photographs are grounded in the conceptual influences of Man Ray, and Marcel Duchamp.

Kroll also curated exhibitions including "Warhol: From Dylan to Duchamp," an exhibition of photographs documenting Warhol's factory era. Photographers included Annie Leibovitz, Robert Mapplethorpe, Helmut Newton, Cecil Beaton, actor Dennis Hopper, and others. The Warhol Museum in Pittsburgh loaned Firestone Gallery Andy Warhol's "Screen Tests" of both Bob Dylan and Marcel Duchamp for the show.

== Books by Eric Kroll ==
- Sex Objects, Addison House, 1977.
- Fetish Girls, Taschen, 1994.
- Beauty Parade, Taschen, 1997.
- The Transformations of Gwen, NBM Publishing, 2000.
- The Transformations of Gwen, Volume 2, NBM Publishing, 2001. ISBN 1-56163-304-6
- Warhol: Dylan to Duchamp, Eric Firestone, 2010. ISBN 0984471502
- THE NEW YORK YEARS 1971 to 1994, Timeless Edition, France 2022
- Hardcore, Timeless Edition, 2025 ISBN 979-1096037353

== Books edited by Eric Kroll ==
- "The Art of Eric Stanton", a volume dedicated to the artwork of Eric Stanton, Taschen, 1996.
- "The Wonderful World of Bill Ward, King of the Glamour Girls", Taschen, 2003. ISBN 3-8228-1290-0
- "The New Erotic Photography", Taschen, 2007. Co-edited with Dian Hanson.

== Collections ==
- USC Fisher Museum of Art
- Smithsonian American Art Museum, Washington, D.C
- World Erotic Art Museum
- Greer Lankton Archives Museum
- Mattress Factory, Pittsburgh, PA
