= Fat Worm of Error =

American rock band

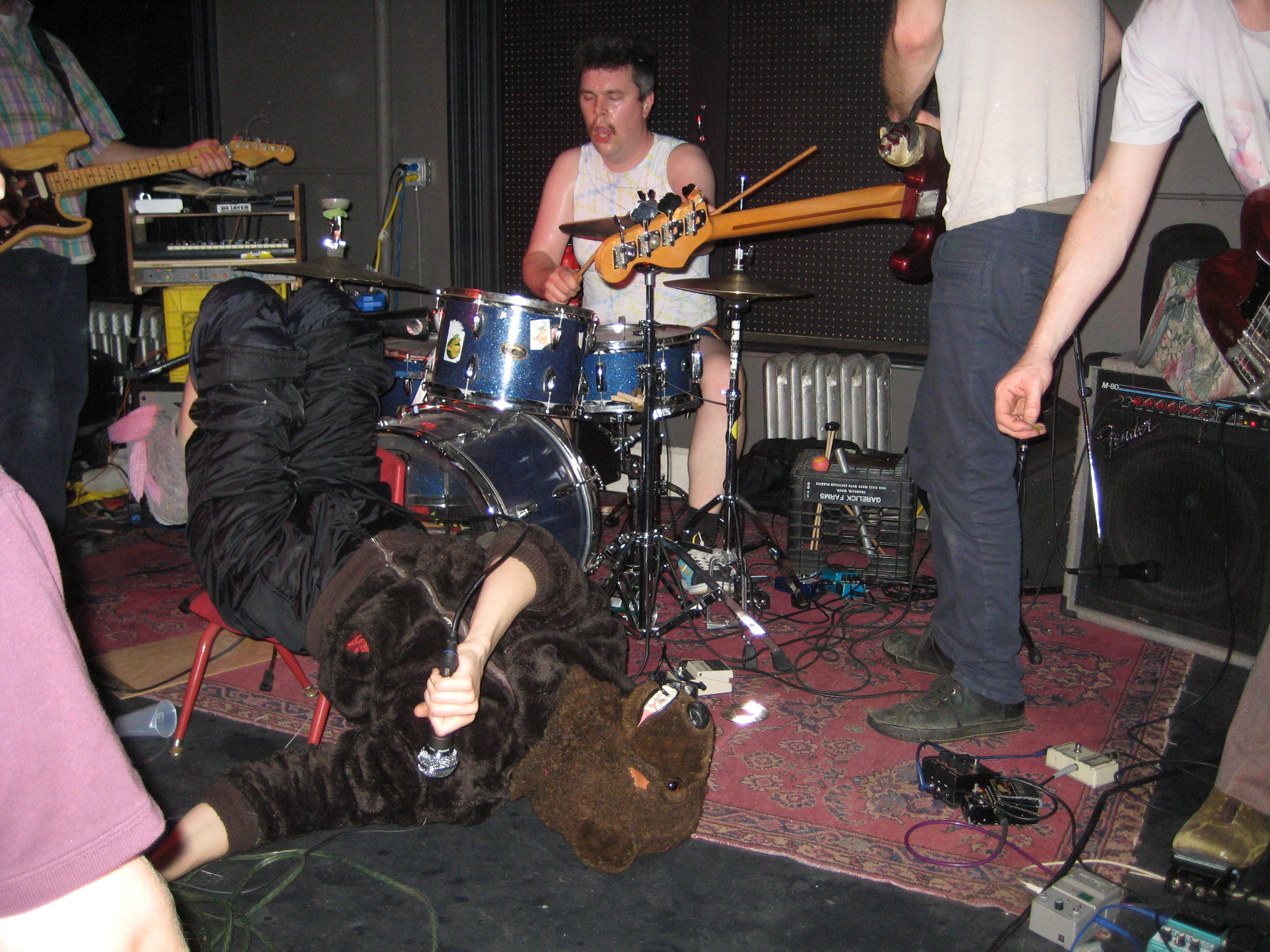

Background information
- Origin: Northampton, MA, United States
- Genres: Avant-rock, free improvisation, noise rock, no wave
- Years active: 2003–present
- Labels: Load Records, Resipiscent, Ecstatic Peace/Open Mouth, Ultra Eczema, Brazilian Wax, De Player
- Members: Neil Young, Donny Shaw, Tim Sheldon, Chris Cooper, Jess Goddard

Fat Worm of Error is an avant-rock band from Northampton, Massachusetts. They are seen as staples of the underground noise and improvisation scene and have helped to start a regional scene of noise music called Western Mass Noise. They utilize traditional rock instruments as well as homemade electronics and other modified instruments. In their live performances, the singer, Jess Goddard, engages in homemade pageantry with homemade surrealist costumes. The band has toured Europe and North America.

== History ==
The band is composed of Jess Goddard (vocals), Tim Sheldon (guitar), Chris Cooper (guitar), Donny Shaw (bass), Neil "Neel" Young Cloaca (drums). They formed in 2002 in Western Massachusetts and played their first show at The Schoolhouse in Hadley, Massachusetts.

Members have been in various bands and solo projects. Members Chris Cooper and Jess Goddard are former members of the band Deerhoof, and pioneering conceptual noise rock band Caroliner. Solo projects include Schurt Kwitters (Goddard), Angst Hase Pfeffer Nase (Cooper), Offal (Shaw), Bromp Treb (Young), and Rack Rash (Sheldon). Other projects include The BSC with Bhob Rainey, Greg Kelley, Howard Stelzer, James Coleman, Liz Tonne, Mike Bullock, Vic Rawlings and Chris Cooper; and the Goonies, a defining Central Massachusetts punk/hardcore/ska band of the mid-1990s.

In 2009, Fat Worm of Error took up residency in Rotterdam, Netherlands at the independent record label and art collective, De Player, where they produced an opera called Poor Sap. The entire set for the opera was handmade by the members during their residency. During their residency, they also produced 50 handmade 8" lathe-cut records of a piece from the opera as a part of the De Player 8" series. In 2010, at the request of Northwestern University, Fat Worm of Error created a soundtrack to 17 Arthur Ganson Machines, which they performed at the Sonic Celluloid festival. The soundtrack was self-released in the later part of 2010. They were named #90 on Tiny Mix Tape's list of top 100 bands of 2000–2009.

== Music ==
Fat Worm of Error has been compared to the Dada art movement and invariably fit into the noise rock and free jazz genres. They often employ a constrained composing technique in the tradition of the Oulipo writers for many of their songs. Their songs often have various discernible patterns for one or a few instruments layered over patterns prescribed to the other remaining instruments. Their music is deconstructionist and orchestrated destructionist, and often examine the restrictions and prescriptions of traditional music theories, like time signatures and harmony. Their version of noisy rock employs tightly controlled, distorted, and modified electronic reverberations and free jazz techniques of instrumental modifications. For example, their bass employs just two strings. The effect often sounds improvisational, and it is to an extent unknown to anyone but the 5 of them.

They have released a split cassette with Deerhoof on Deathbomb Arc and appear on a compilation mastered by Hans Grusel with Sun City Girls, Caroliner, Nautical Almanac, Metalux, Wolf Eyes, Mono Pause, Hans Grüsel's Krankenkabinet, Tarantism, Tom Recchion, Sixes, Bran(...)Pos, Masonic Youth, Pod Blotz, Smegma, Panicsville, and others on Resipiscent.

== Discography ==
- Brickfaced: Vol 2. - Cassette (Yeay! Plastics, 2011)
- Broods - LP (Ecstatic Peace/Open Mouth, 2010)
- Double-headed Baby - 7" (Brazilian Wax, 2010)
- Ambivalence and the Beaker - CD (Resipiscent, 2010)
- Music for 17 Arthur Ganson Machines - Cassette (Self-released, 2010)
- Poor Sap - Lathe, 8" (Drop Of Blood Records, 2009)
- Feted Corps - with Deerhoof cassette split (Deathbomb Arc, 2007)
- Pregnant Babies Pregnant with Pregnant Babies - LP and CD (Load Records, 2006)
- Numbers - 7" (Ultra Eczema, 2006)
- Brickfaced - Cassette (Brazilian Wax, 2005)
- String Of Artifacts - (Fish Pies, Resipiscent, Compilation V/A, 2005)
- NZZNZZZZNNZNZNNNN - CD (Yeay! Cassettes, 2004)
- Summer Mixtape - Cassette (Self-released, 2003)
- C C - Cassette (Yeay! Cassettes, 2003)
- Feelin' Fine - 7" (No label, 2003)
- Grx EP - CD (No label, 2003)
