= Matthew Morris =

Matthew or Matt Morris may refer to:

- Matt Morris (baseball) (born 1974), Major League Baseball pitcher
- Matt Morris (musician) (born 1979), American musician
- Matt Morris (guitarist) (born 1970), musician, with Plaid Retina
- Matt Morris (engineer) (born 1974), British motor racing engineer, chief engineer of the McLaren Formula One team (2013–2018)
- Matthew Morris (politician) (1969–2020), Australian politician
- Matt Morris (wrestler) (born 1987), a professional wrestler, better known from his time in WWE as Aiden English.
- Matthew David Morris (known as MattyBRaps; born 2003), American rapper
