= Liz Allbee =

American musician

- Origin: Berlin, Vermont, United States
- Genres: Improvisation, Electroacoustic
- Occupations: Musician, composer
- Instrument: Trumpet
- Years active: 1996–present
- Label: others
- Website: https://lizallbee.net

Liz Allbee (born 1976) is a trumpet player, composer, performer, and improviser, originally from Vermont, in the United States, and now living and working in Berlin, Germany.

Allbee lived and worked in the San Francisco Bay Area for 14 years (1995–2009), before moving to Berlin. She received her BA in Intermedia Arts at Mills College in Oakland, California in 2004.

Allbee's works can mainly be assigned to genres such as new music, improvisation, electroacoustic music, and noise music. She also writes music for film and theater, and has taken part in numerous international festivals. Her interests extend to playing quadrophonic and multiphonic compositions, via a self-designed modified trumpet that can play several individual parallel channels of sound simultaneously.

During her time in San Francisco, Allbee performed with Anthony Braxton, the Rova Saxophone Quartet, Fred Frith, Gino Robair, and many others. Since moving to Germany, she has worked with, among others, Axel Dörner, Michael Renkel, Antje Vowinckel, and at festivals and locations such as CTM and ausland.
