= WGNS Recordings =

American record label

WGNS Recordings releases music recorded by WGNS Studios.

== History ==
WGNS was initially started by Gray Matter's Geoff Turner in Maryland in the early 1980s as a cassette label. WGNS stood for "We Gots No Station." Initial recordings were mastered to a cassette and then dubbed from the master to cassettes which were numbered and sold. The releases typically included a ziploc bag containing artwork and lyric sheets. As time went on, Turner built WGNS Studios as a basement recording studio for local musicians. The studio moved many times, with locations in Maryland, Washington, DC, and Virginia.

In 1984 the first vinyl release, the Bloody Mannequin Orchestra's Roadmap to Revolution LP, a 12" 33⅓ rpm record was released.

WGNS was responsible for the rise of artists such as Ennui and Dave Grohl. In the summer of 1991, Scream drummer Grohl went into WGNS Studios and recorded four songs, playing all the instruments himself. A tape of the songs, given by Grohl to Simple Machines co-founder Jenny Toomey, became a candidate for the label's Tool Cassette Series. Simple Machines released the songs on the Pocketwatch (album) using Grohl's pseudonym Late! in summer 1992. In May 1992, Ennui recorded at the WGNS studio located in Arlington, Virginia. Grohl recorded again at WGNS Studios in December 1996, when it was back in Washington, DC.

== Releases ==
- Simply Suberbe
- Gots No Station Compilation
- Streetlights in the Dark
- The Candy's Not Poisoned
- Roadmap to Revolution
- WGNS/Metrozine Compilation
- The Halloween Cassette

== See also ==
- List of record labels
