= Colin Sears =

American drummer

Colin Sears is an American drummer who has performed in Bloody Mannequin Orchestra, Dag Nasty, The Marshes, Rumblepuppy, Grave Goods, Bloodbats, Los Vampiros, Thundering Asteroids!, Handgun Bravado, and The Valley Floor. He was in the original incarnation of Fugazi.

In the early 1990s, Sears joined Vic Bondi's (former Articles of Faith guitarist/singer) band Alloy to record & tour Europe and the US.

Sears initially joined Dag Nasty as drummer in August 1985, and he performed with them until June 1987. He rejoined Dag Nasty in 1991, and has been with the band since.

He currently works as a city planner in Portland, Oregon.
