= Marvin Gaye discography =

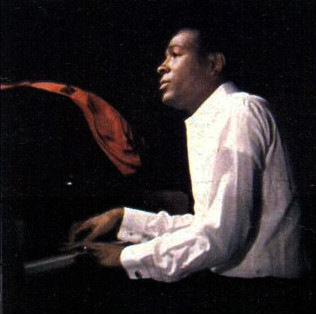
- Marvin Gaye in 1968
- Studio albums: 25
- Soundtrack albums: 1
- Live albums: 4
- Compilation albums: 24
- Tribute albums: 2
- Singles: 83
- Video albums: 3
- Music videos: 2

American music artist Marvin Gaye released 16 studio albums, seven duet albums, four live albums, one soundtrack album, 24 compilation albums, and 83 singles. In 1961 Gaye signed a recording contract with Tamla Records, owned by Motown. The first release under the label was The Soulful Moods of Marvin Gaye. Gaye's first album to chart was a duet album with Mary Wells titled Together, peaking at number forty-two on the Billboard pop album chart. His 1965 album, Moods of Marvin Gaye, became his first album to reach the top ten of the R&B album charts and spawned four hit singles. Gaye recorded more than thirty hit singles for Motown throughout the 1960s, becoming established as "the Prince of Motown". Gaye topped the charts in 1968 with his rendition of "I Heard It Through the Grapevine", while his 1969 album, M.P.G., became his first number one R&B album. Gaye's landmark album, What's Going On (1971), became the first album by a solo artist to launch three top ten singles, including the title track. His 1973 single "Let's Get It On" topped the charts while its subsequent album reached number two on the charts, becoming his most successful Motown album. In 1982, after 21 years with Motown, Gaye signed with Columbia Records and issued Midnight Love, which included his most successful single to date, "Sexual Healing". Since his death in 1984, four albums have been released posthumously, along with re-issues of some of Gaye's landmark works.

Gaye recorded sixty-seven charted singles on the Billboard charts, with forty-one reaching the top forty, eighteen reaching the top ten and three peaking at number one on the Billboard Hot 100. One of the most successful charting artists of all time on the Billboard Hot 100, Gaye charted at least one single there for 19 calendar years over a 40-year chart span (1962-2001). Sixty of his singles reached the top forty of the R&B charts, with thirty-eight of those reaching the top ten and thirteen peaking at number one. Gaye also had success in international charts, his biggest success in sales and chart positions peaking in the UK while achieving modest success in other countries.

== Studio albums ==
Title	Album details	Peak chart positions										Certifications
Title	Album details	US	US R&B	AUS	CAN	GER	IRE	NED	NZ	SWE	UK	Certifications
The Soulful Moods of Marvin Gaye	Released: June 8, 1961; Label: Tamla (#TM-221)	—	—	—	—N/a	—	—	—	—N/a	—	—	
That Stubborn Kinda Fellow	Released: January 31, 1963; Label: Tamla (#TM-239)	—	—	—	—N/a	—	—	—	—N/a	—	—	
When I'm Alone I Cry	Released: April 1, 1964; Label: Tamla (#TM-251)	—	—	—	—N/a	—	—	—	—N/a	—	—	
Hello Broadway	Released: November 12, 1964; Label: Tamla (#TM-259)	—	—	—	—N/a	—	—	—	—N/a	—	—	
How Sweet It Is to Be Loved by You	Released: January 21, 1965; Label: Tamla (#TM-258)	128	4	—	—N/a	—	—	—	—N/a	—	—	
A Tribute to the Great Nat King Cole	Released: November 1, 1965; Label: Tamla (#TM-261)	—	—	—	—N/a	—	—	—	—N/a	—	—	
Moods of Marvin Gaye	Released: May 23, 1966; Label: Tamla (#TM-266)	118	8	—	—	—	—	—	—N/a	—	—	
In the Groove (Note: This album has also been titled I Heard It Through the Grapevine on reissues.)	Released: August 26, 1968; Label: Tamla (#TM-285)	63	2	—	36	—	—	—	—N/a	—	—	UK: Gold
M.P.G.	Released: April 30, 1969; Label: Tamla (#TM-292)	33	1	—	—	—	—	—	—N/a	—	—	
That's the Way Love Is	Released: January 8, 1970; Label: Tamla (#TM-299)	189	17	—	—	—	—		—N/a	—	—	
What's Going On	Released: May 21, 1971; Label: Tamla (#TM-310)	6	1	—	37	—	64^{[A]}	—	—N/a	—	56^{[B]}	US: Gold; UK: Platinum
Let's Get It On	Released: August 28, 1973; Label: Tamla (#TM-329)	2	1	—	10	—	—	—	—N/a	—	39	UK: Gold
I Want You	Released: March 16, 1976; Label: Tamla (#TM-342)	4	1	87	19	—	—	—	—	—	22	
Here, My Dear	Released: December 15, 1978; Label: Tamla (#TM-364)	26	4	—	35	—	—	—	—	—	—	
In Our Lifetime	Released: January 15, 1981; Label: Tamla (#TM-374)	32	6	—	—	—	—	—	—	—	48	
Midnight Love	Released: November 8, 1982; Label: Columbia (#85977)	7	1	23	7	20	—	8	6	14	10	US: 3× Platinum; UK: Gold
"—" denotes items that did not chart or were not released in that territory. "N/A" indicates chart not yet published.

=== Posthumous ===
Title	Album details	Peak chart positions									
Title	Album details	US	US R&B	BEL	CAN	EUR	GER	SCO	SWI	UK	UK Sales
Dream of a Lifetime	Released: May 21, 1985; Label: Columbia (#39916)	41	8	—	94	90	—	—N/a	—	46	—
Romantically Yours	Released: November 1985; Label: Columbia (#40208)	—	—	—	—	—	—	—N/a	—	—	—
Vulnerable	Released: April 22, 1997; Label: Motown (#314530786)	—	—	—	—	—	—	—	—	—	—
You're the Man	Released: March 29, 2019; Label: Tamla (#TM-316)	168	17	57	—	—	46	30	80	52	23
"—" denotes items that did not chart or were not released in that territory. "N/A" indicates chart not yet published.

== Collaborative albums ==
Title	Duet with	Album details	Peak chart positions					Certifications
Title	Duet with	Album details	US	US R&B	AUS	CAN	UK	Certifications
Together	Mary Wells	Released: April 15, 1964; Label: Motown (#MT-613)	42	—	—N/a	—N/a	—	
Take Two	Kim Weston	Released: August 25, 1966; Label: Tamla (#TS-270)	—	24	—N/a	—N/a	—	
United	Tammi Terrell	Released: August 29, 1967; Label: Tamla (#TS-277)	69	7	—N/a	—	—	US: Gold
You're All I Need	Tammi Terrell	Released: August 1968; Label: Tamla (#TS-284)	60	4	—N/a	—	—	
Easy	Tammi Terrell	Released: September 16, 1969; Label: Tamla (#TS-294)	184	—	—N/a	—	—	
Diana & Marvin	Diana Ross	Released: October 26, 1973; Label: Motown (#M5-124V1)	26	7	26	86	6	UK: Gold
"—" denotes items that did not chart or were not released in that territory. "N/A" indicates chart not yet published.

== Soundtrack albums ==
Title	Album details	Peak chart positions	
Title	Album details	US	US R&B
Trouble Man	Released: December 8, 1972; Label: Tamla (#TM-322)	14	3

== Live albums ==
Title	Album details	Peak chart positions			
Title	Album details	US	US R&B	AUS	CAN
Marvin Gaye Recorded Live on Stage	Released: September 9, 1963; Label: Tamla (#TM-242)	—	—	—N/a	—N/a
Marvin Gaye Live!	Released: June 19, 1974; Label: Tamla (#T6-333S1)	8	1	96	12
Live at the London Palladium	Released: March 15, 1977; Label: Tamla (#T7-352R2)	3	1	93	14
Marvin Gaye: Live in Montreux 1980	Released: May 16, 2003; Label: Eagle (#20010-2)	—	—	—	—
Marvin Gaye at the Copa	Released: April 29, 2005; Label: Hip-O Select (#B0003629-02)	—	—	—	—
What's Going On Live	Released: October 18, 2019; Label: Tamla (#B0030147-01)	—	—	—	—
"—" denotes items that did not chart or were not released in that territory. "N/A" indicates chart not yet published.

== Compilation albums ==
There has been over 300 official and unofficial compilation albums released across the world for Marvin Gaye. Below is a selected discography of compilation albums with chart history.

=== 1960s–1970s ===
Year	Title	Peak chart positions				Certifications
Year	Title	US	US R&B	CAN	UK	Certifications
1964	Greatest Hits	72	—	—	—	
1967	Greatest Hits, Vol. 2	178	19	—	40	
1969	Marvin Gaye and His Girls	183	16	—	—	
1970	Super Hits	117	19	—	—	
1970	Greatest Hits (with Tammi Terrell)	171	17	—	60	
1974	Anthology	61	10	64	—	
1976	Marvin Gaye's Greatest Hits	44	17	—	—	US: Platinum
1976	The Best of Marvin Gaye	—	—	—	56	
"—" denotes items that did not chart or were not released in that territory.

=== 1980s–1990s ===
Year	Title	Peak chart positions									Certifications
Year	Title	US	US R&B	AUS	EUR	NED	NZ	SCO	SWE	UK	Certifications
1983	Greatest Hits (Telstar release)	—	—	—	73	—	—	—N/a	—	13	UK: Gold
1983	Every Great Motown Hit of Marvin Gaye	80	26	—	—	—	—	—N/a	—	—	US: Platinum; UK: Silver
1983	15 Greatest Hits – Compact Command Performances	—	—	—	—	—	—	—N/a	—	—	
1984	Motown Superstar Series Volume 15	—	62	—	—	—	—	—N/a	—	—	
1986	Motown Remembers Marvin Gaye	193	48	—	—	—	—	—N/a	—	—	
1988	A Musical Testament: 1964–1984	—	69	—	—	—	—	—N/a	—	—	UK: Silver
1988	Love Songs (with Smokey Robinson)	—	—	—	—	—	—	—N/a	—	69	UK: Gold
1990	The Marvin Gaye Collection	—	67	—	—	—	—	—N/a	—	—	
1990	Missing You – The Best of Marvin Gaye	—	—	—	—	36	—	—N/a	—	—	
1990	Love Songs	—	—	—	—	—	—	—N/a	—	39	
1994	The Very Best of Marvin Gaye	—	—	14	12	7	32	12	19	3	NZ: Gold; UK: 2× Platinum
1994	Marvin Gaye	—	—	—	—	—	—	99	—	82	
"—" denotes items that did not chart or were not released in that territory. "N/A" indicates chart not yet published.

=== 2000–present ===
Year	Title	Peak chart positions										Certifications
Year	Title	US	US R&B	EUR	IRE	NED	NOR	SCO	SPA	SWE	UK	Certifications
2000	The Love Songs	—	—	45	—	—	—	48	—	—	8	UK: Gold
2001	The Very Best of Marvin Gaye (US edition/European re-release)	167	85	69	—	—	9	35	81	54	15	US: Gold; UK: Gold
2002	Forever Yours	—	—	—	—	—	—	—	—	—	—	
2005	Gold	147	86	—	—	—	—	—	—	—	—	
2006	The Love Collection	—	—	—	—	—	—	71	—	—	44	
2006	Soul Legends	—	—	—	—	94	—	—	—	—	—	
2007	Number 1's	175	87	—	—	—	—	—	—	—	—	
2008	Playlist Your Way	—	77	—	—	—	—	—	—	—	—	
2010	Love Marvin – The Greatest Love Songs	—	—	—	—	—	—	62	—	—	27	UK: Gold
2010	Icon: Marvin Gaye	—	41	—	—	—	—	—	—	—	—	
2011	S.O.U.L.: Marvin Gaye	—	68	—	—	—	—	—	—	—	—	
2012	S.O.U.L.: Marvin Gaye Volume 2	—	35	—	—	—	—	—	—	—	—	
2012	Ain't No Mountain High Enough – The Collection	—	—	—	83	—	—	—	—	—	—	
2014	Collected	—	—	—	—	61	—	—	—	—	—	
"—" denotes items that did not chart or were not released in that territory.

== Singles ==
=== 1960s ===
Year	Title	B-side	Peak chart positions						Certifications	Album
Year	Title	B-side	US	US R&B	CAN	IRE	NED	UK	Certifications	Album
1961	"Let Your Conscience Be Your Guide"	"Never Let You Go (Sha-Lu Bop)"	—	—	—	—	—	—		The Soulful Moods of Marvin Gaye
1962	"Sandman"	"I'm Yours, You're Mine"	—	—	—	—	—	—		Greatest Hits
1962	"Soldier's Plea"	"Taking My Time"	—	—	—	—	—	—		That Stubborn; Kinda Fellow
1962	"Stubborn Kind of Fellow"	"It Hurt Me Too"	46	8	—	—	—	—		That Stubborn; Kinda Fellow
1962	"Hitch Hike"	"Hello There Angel"	30	12	—	—	—	—		That Stubborn; Kinda Fellow
1963	"Pride and Joy"	"One of These Days" (from How Sweet It Is to Be Loved By You)	10	2	—	—	—	—		That Stubborn; Kinda Fellow
1963	"Can I Get a Witness"	"I'm Crazy 'Bout My Baby"	22	3	—	—	—	—		Greatest Hits
1963	"Can I Get a Witness"	"I'm Crazy 'Bout My Baby"	77	—	—	—	—	—		Greatest Hits
1964	"You're a Wonderful One"	"When I'm Alone I Cry" (from When I'm Alone I Cry)	15	3	—	—	—	—		How Sweet It Is to Be Loved by You
1964	"Once Upon a Time"^{[C]}	Double A-side	19	3	12	—	—	50		Together
1964	"What's the Matter with You Baby"^{[C]}	Double A-side	17	2	—	—	—	—		Together
1964	"Try It Baby"	"If My Heart Could Sing" (from When I'm Alone I Cry)	15	6	32	—	—	—		How Sweet It Is to Be Loved by You
1964	"Baby Don't You Do It"	"Walk on the Wild Side" (from Hello Broadway)	27	14	—	—	—	—		How Sweet It Is to Be Loved by You
1964	"What Good Am I Without You"^{[D]}	"I Want You 'Round"^{[D]}	61	28	—	—	—	—		Take Two
1964	"How Sweet It Is (to Be Loved by You)"	"Forever"	6	3	—	—	—	49	UK: Silver	How Sweet It Is to Be Loved by You
1965	"I'll Be Doggone"	"You've Been a Long Time Coming"	8	1	—	—	—	—		Moods of Marvin Gaye
1965	"Pretty Little Baby"	"Now That You've Won Me" (non-album track)	25	16	15	—	—	—		Greatest Hits, Vol. 2
1965	"Ain't That Peculiar"	"She's Got to Be Real" (non-album track)	8	1	—	—	—	—		Moods of Marvin Gaye
1966	"One More Heartache"	"When I Had Your Love" (non-album track)	29	4	88	—	—	—		Moods of Marvin Gaye
1966	"Take This Heart of Mine"	"Need Your Lovin' – Want You Back"	44	16	75	—	—	56 (Note: Chart position is from the official UK "Breakers List".)		Moods of Marvin Gaye
1966	"Little Darling (I Need You)"	"Hey Diddle Diddle"	47	10	58	—	—	50		Moods of Marvin Gaye
1966	"It Takes Two"^{[D]}	"It's Got to Be a Miracle"^{[D]}	14	4	14	—	13	16	UK: Silver	Take Two
1967	"Ain't No Mountain High Enough"^{[E]}	"Give a Little Love"^{[E]}	19	3	18	—	—	55	US: 7× Platinum; GER: Gold; NZ: 6× Platinum; UK: 4× Platinum	United
1967	"Your Unchanging Love"	"I'll Take Care of You" (non-album track)	33	7	34	—	—	51		Moods of Marvin Gaye
1967	"Your Precious Love"^{[E]}	"Hold Me Oh My Darling"^{[E]}	5	2	1	—	—	—		United
1967	"If I Could Build My Whole World Around You"^{[E]}	"If This World Were Mine"^{[E]}	10	2	17	—	—	41		United
1967	"If I Could Build My Whole World Around You"^{[E]}	"If This World Were Mine"^{[E]}	68	27	65	—	—	—		United
1967	"You"	"Change What You Can"	34	7	27	—	—	52		In the Groove
1968	"Ain't Nothing Like the Real Thing"^{[E]}	"Little Ole Boy, Little Ole Girl" (from United)^{[E]}	8	1	9	—	—	34		You're All I Need
1968	"You're All I Need to Get By"^{[E]}	"Two Can Have a Party" (from United)^{[E]}	7	1	10	—	—	19	UK: Silver	You're All I Need
1968	"Chained"	"At Last (I Found a Love)"	32	8	43	—	—	—		In the Groove
1968	"Keep On Lovin' Me Honey"^{[E]}.	"You Ain't Livin' till You're Lovin'"^{[E]}	24	11	18	—	—	—		You're All I Need
1968	"Keep On Lovin' Me Honey"^{[E]}.	"You Ain't Livin' till You're Lovin'"^{[E]}	—	—	—	—	—	21		You're All I Need
1968	"His Eye Is on the Sparrow"	"Just a Closer Walk with Thee"^{[F]}	—	—	—	—	—	—		In Loving Memory
1968	"I Heard It Through the Grapevine"	"You're What's Happening (in the World Today)"	1	1	8	7	—	1	UK: Platinum; NZ: 2× Platinum	In the Groove
1969	"Good Lovin' Ain't Easy to Come By"^{[E]}	"Satisfied Feelin'"^{[E]}	30	11	40	—	—	26		Easy
1969	"Too Busy Thinking About My Baby"	"Wherever I Lay My Hat (That's My Home)" (from That Stubborn Kinda Fellow)	4	1	15	—	—	5		M.P.G.
1969	"That's the Way Love Is"	"Gonna Keep on Tryin' till I Win Your Love"	7	2	14	—	—	—		M.P.G. / That's the Way Love Is
1969	"What You Gave Me"^{[E]}	"How You Gonna Keep It (After You Get It)"^{[E]}	49	6	75	—	—	—		Easy
"—" denotes items that did not chart or were not released in that territory.

=== 1970–1984 ===
Year	Title	B-side	Peak chart positions									Certifications	Album
Year	Title	B-side	US	US R&B	AUS	CAN	GER	IRE	NED	SWE	UK	Certifications	Album
1970	"How Can I Forget".	"Gonna Give Her All the Love I've Got"	41	18	37	37	—	—	—	—	—		That's the Way Love Is
1970	"How Can I Forget".	"Gonna Give Her All the Love I've Got"	67	26	83	—	—	—	—	—	—		That's the Way Love Is
1970	"The Onion Song"^{[E]}.	"California Soul"^{[E]}	50	18	—	—	—	—	—	—	9		Easy
1970	"The Onion Song"^{[E]}.	"California Soul"^{[E]}	50	—	79	69	—	—	—	—	—		Easy
1970	"Abraham, Martin and John"	"How Can I Forget"	—	—	—	—	—	—	—	—	9		That's the Way Love Is
1970	"The End of Our Road"	"Me and My Lonely Room" (from How Sweet It Is to Be Loved By You)	40	7	—	53	—	—	—	—	—		M.P.G.
1971	"What's Going On"^{[G]}	"God Is Love"	2	1	69	76	—	—	—	—	80	UK: Platinum; NZ: Platinum	What's Going On
1971	"Mercy Mercy Me (The Ecology)"	"Sad Tomorrows" (non-album track)	4	1	—	9	—	—	—	—	52	UK: Silver; NZ: Gold	What's Going On
1971	"Inner City Blues (Make Me Wanna Holler)"	"Wholy Holy"	9	1	—	29	—	—	—	—	—		What's Going On
1971	"Save the Children"	"Little Darling (I Need You)" (from Moods of Marvin Gaye)	—	—	—	—	—	—	—	—	41		What's Going On
1972	"You're the Man" (Part 1)	"You're the Man" (Part 2)	50	7	—	—	—	—	—	—	—		You're the Man
1972	"Trouble Man"	"Don't Mess with Mr. T"	7	4	—	76	—	—	—	—	—		Trouble Man
1972	"I Want to Come Home for Christmas"	"Christmas in the City"	—	—	—	—	—	—	—	92	—		Non-album single
1973	"Let's Get It On"	"I Wish It Would Rain" (from That's the Way Love Is)	1	1	—	11	—	—	—	—	31	US: Platinum; UK: Platinum; NZ: 2× Platinum	Let's Get It On
1973	"You're a Special Part of Me"^{[H]}	"I'm Falling in Love with You"^{[H]}	12	4	—	25	—	—	—	—	—		Diana & Marvin
1973	"Stop, Look, Listen (To Your Heart)"^{[H]}	"Love Twins"^{[H]}	—	—	—	—	—	—	—	—	25		Diana & Marvin
1973	"Come Get to This"	"Distant Lover"	21	3	—	—	—	—	—	—	51		Let's Get It On
1974	"You Sure Love to Ball"	"Just to Keep You Satisfied"	50	13	—	62	—	—	—	—	—		Let's Get It On
1974	"My Mistake (Was to Love You)"^{[H]}	"Include Me in Your Life"^{[H]}	19	15	—	16	—	—	—	—	—		Diana & Marvin
1974	"You Are Everything"^{[H]}	"The Onion Song"^{[E]}	—	—	—	—	—	20	13	—	5	UK: Silver	Diana & Marvin
1974	"Don't Knock My Love"^{[H]}	"Just Say, Just Say"^{[H]}	46	25	—	53	—	—	—	—	—		Diana & Marvin
1974	"Distant Lover" (live)	"Trouble Man"	28	12	—	35	—	—	—	—	—		Marvin Gaye Live!
1976	"I Want You"	"I Want You" (instrumental)	15	1	—	45	—	—	—	—	—		I Want You
1976	"After the Dance"	"Feel All My Love Inside"	74	14	—	—	—	—	—	—	—		I Want You
1977	"Got to Give It Up" (Part 1)	"Got to Give It Up" (Part 2)	1	1	89	3	—	—	24	—	7	UK: Gold; NZ: Platinum	Live at the London Palladium
1978	"Pops, We Love You"^{[I]}	"Pops, We Love You" (instrumental)^{[I]}	59	26	—	60	—	—	—	—	66		"Pops We Love You"...The Album
1979	"A Funky Space Reincarnation" (Part 1)	"A Funky Space Reincarnation" (Part 2)	^{[J]}	23	—	—	—	—	—	—	—		Here, My Dear
1979	"Anger"	"Time to Get It Together"	—	—	—	—	—	—	—	—	—		Here, My Dear
1979	"Ego Tripping Out"	"Ego Tripping Out" (instrumental)	—	17	—	—	—	—	—	—	—		In Our Lifetime
1981	"Praise"	"Funk Me"	—	18	—	—	—	—	—	—	—		In Our Lifetime
1981	"Heavy Love Affair"	"Far Cry"	—	61	—	—	—	—	—	—	—		In Our Lifetime
1982	"Sexual Healing"	"Sexual Healing" (instrumental)	3	1	4	1	23	7	3	17	4	US: Platinum; CAN: Gold; UK: Platinum; NZ: 4× Platinum	Midnight Love
1983	"My Love Is Waiting"	"Rockin' After Midnight"	—	—	—	—	—	—	45	—	34		Midnight Love
1983	"'Til Tomorrow"	"Rockin' After Midnight"	—	31	—	—	—	—	—	—	—		Midnight Love
1983	"Joy"	"Turn on Some Music"	—	78	—	—	—	—	—	—	—		Midnight Love
"—" denotes items that did not chart or were not released in that territory.

=== Posthumous ===
Year	Title	B-side	Peak chart positions									Certifications	Album
Year	Title	B-side	US	US R&B	AUS	GER	IRE	NED	SCO	SWE	UK	Certifications	Album
1985	"Sanctified Lady"	"Sanctified Lady" (instrumental)	^{[K]}	2	—	—	—	—	—N/a	—	51		Dream of a Lifetime
1985	"It's Madness"	"Ain't It Funny (How Things Turn Around)"	—	55	—	—	—	—	—N/a	—	—		Dream of a Lifetime
1985	"Just Like"	"More"	—	—	—	—	—	—	—N/a	—	—		Romantically Yours
1986	"I Heard it Through the Grapevine" (re-issue)	"Can I Get a Witness"	—	—	60	48	4	23	—N/a	—	8		Motown Remembers; Marvin Gaye
1986	"The World Is Rated X"	"No Greater Love"	—	—	—	—	—	—	—N/a	—	95		Motown Remembers; Marvin Gaye
1991	"My Last Chance"	"Once Upon a Time"^{[C]}	—	16	—	—	—	—	—N/a	—	—		The Marvin Gaye; Collection
1994	"Lucky, Lucky Me"	CD single includes 6 remixes	—	—	—	—	—	—	—	—	67		The Very Best of Marvin Gaye
1995	"This Love Starved Heart of Mine (It's Killing Me)"	"It's a Desperate Situation"	—	—	—	—	—	—	—	—	—		Love Starved Heart; Rare and Unreleased
2001	"Music"^{[L]}	"Stick 'Em"^{[M]}	22	2	—	—	—	—	94	—	36		Music
2001	"I'm Hot"^{[L]}	"Do-Re-Mi"^{[N]}	—	49	—	—	—	—	—	—	—		Music
2005	"Let's Get It On" (MPG Groove Mix)	"Papa Was a Rolling Stone" (remixes)^{[O]}	—	93	—	—	—	—	—	—	—	US: Gold	Non-album singles
2013	"Ain't No Mountain High Enough" (re-issue)^{[E]}	No B-side	—	—	—	—	78	—	67	—	80		Non-album singles
2015	"Sexual Healing" (Kygo remix)	No B-side	—	—	—	—	80	75	56	57	—		Non-album singles
"—" denotes items that did not chart or were not released in that territory. "N/A" indicates chart not yet published.

=== Billboard year-end performances ===
Year	Song	Year-end position
1963	"Pride and Joy"	61
1965	"I'll Be Doggone"	58
1965	"How Sweet It Is (To Be Loved by You)"	100
1967	"Your Precious Love"^{[E]}	32
1967	"Ain't No Mountain High Enough"^{[E]}	87
1968	"Ain't Nothing Like the Real Thing"^{[E]}	57
1968	"You're All I Need to Get By"^{[E]}	82
1969	"Too Busy Thinking About My Baby"	14
1969	"That's the Way Love Is"	72
1969	"I Heard It Through the Grapevine"	88
1971	"What's Going On"	21
1971	"Mercy Mercy Me (The Ecology)"	62
1973	"Let's Get It On"	4
1974	"My Mistake (Was to Love You)"^{[H]}	92
1977	"Got to Give It Up"	20
1983	"Sexual Healing"	32
2001	"Music"^{[L]}	83

=== Footnotes ===
- ^{^[A]} What's Going On did not chart in Ireland until 2006.
- ^{^[B]} What's Going On did not chart in the UK until 1996.
- ^{^[C]} With Mary Wells.
- ^{^[D]} With Kim Weston.
- ^{^[E]} With Tammi Terrell.
- ^{^[F]} By Gladys Knight & the Pips.
- ^{^[G]} "What's Going On" did not chart in The UK until 1983.
- ^{^[H]} With Diana Ross.
- ^{^[I]} With Diana Ross, Smokey Robinson and Stevie Wonder.
- ^{^[J]} "A Funky Space Reincarnation" peaked at #8 on the Bubbling Under Hot 100 chart.
- ^{^[K]} "Sanctified Lady" peaked at #1 on the Bubbling Under Hot 100 chart.
- ^{^[L]} Erick Sermon featuring Marvin Gaye.
- ^{^[M]} By Cha Cha.
- ^{^[N]} Erick Sermon featuring LL Cool J and Scarface.
- ^{^[O]} By The Temptations.

== Music videos ==
Year	Title
1979	"A Funky Space Reincarnation"
1982	"Sexual Healing"
1994	"Inner City Blues (Make Me Wanna Holler)"

== Other appearances ==
Year	Song	Artist(s)	Album
1994	"Sexual Healing" (live version)		Grammy's Greatest Moments Volume I
2013	"Rage"	Young Buck	Back on My Buck Shit Vol. 3
