= Anthology (Marvin Gaye album) =

Greatest hits album by Marvin Gaye

Anthology: Marvin Gaye

Greatest hits album by Marvin Gaye
- Released: August 22, 1995
- Genre: Soul
- Length: 153:08
- Label: Motown
- Producers: William "Mickey" Stevenson, Brian Holland, Lamont Dozier, Smokey Robinson, Harvey Fuqua, Ashford & Simpson, Frank Wilson, Norman Whitfield, Marvin Gaye, Hal Davis, Leon Ware, Art Stewart

Marvin Gaye chronology
Diana & Marvin (1973)	Anthology: Marvin Gaye (1974)	Marvin Gaye Live! (1974)
The Master (1961–1984) (1994)	Anthology (1995)	Vulnerable (1997)

Professional ratings
Review scores
Source	Rating
Allmusic	5/5 stars
Tom Hull	A+ (1986 CD)

Anthology: The Best of Marvin Gaye is a double CD chronology of American singer Marvin Gaye's career throughout his twenty-year tenure with Motown Records from his first hit song, 1962's "Stubborn Kind of Fellow", to his final Motown R&B charter, "Heavy Love Affair" in 1981. The anthology also covered a set of duet recordings with Mary Wells, Kim Weston, Tammi Terrell, and Diana Ross, as well as unreleased recordings from the 1960s and 1970s.

Gaye's Anthology set was actually released a total of three times in different track listings. The 1974 original, which charted, featured singles spanning from his 1962's "Stubborn" to material from his What's Going On album, while a 1986 re-issue featured songs from Let's Get It On, I Want You and duets with Diana Ross.

The 1995 re-issue deleted some of the duets from the other two releases and included material from Gaye's later period (1978–1981). The set has since been out of stock for some time.

== Track listing ==
1974 US 3LP	1974 Int'l 2LP	1986 2CD	1995 2CD	Title
1.1	1.1	1.01	1.01	"Stubborn Kind of Fellow"
1.2	1.2	1.02	1.02	"Hitch Hike"
1.3	1.3	1.03	1.03	"Pride and Joy"
1.4		1.04		"Once Upon a Time" (with Mary Wells)
1.5	1.4	1.05	1.04	"Can I Get a Witness"
1.6	1.5	1.06	1.06	"What's the Matter with You Baby" (with Mary Wells)
1.7	1.6	1.07		"You're a Wonderful One"
2.1	1.7	1.08	1.05	"Try It Baby"
2.2	1.8	1.09	1.07	"Baby Don't You Do It"
2.3		1.10		"What Good Am I Without You" (with Kim Weston)
2.4		1.11		"Forever"
2.5	1.9	1.12	1.08	"How Sweet It Is (To Be Loved by You)"
2.6	2.7	1.13	1.15	"It Takes Two" (with Kim Weston)
2.7	2.1	1.14	1.09	"I'll Be Doggone"
3.1	2.2	1.15		"Pretty Little Baby"
3.2	2.3	1.16	1.10	"Ain't That Peculiar"
3.3		1.17	1.16	"Ain't No Mountain High Enough" (with Tammi Terrell)
3.4	2.4	1.18	1.11	"One More Heartache"
3.5	2.5	1.19	1.12	"Take This Heart of Mine"
3.6		1.20	1.19	"Your Precious Love" (with Tammi Terrell)
3.7	2.6	1.21	1.13	"Little Darling (I Need You)"
4.1	2.8	1.22	1.17	"Your Unchanging Love"
4.2		1.23		"If This World Were Mine" (with Tammi Terrell)
4.3	2.9	1.24	1.21	"You"
4.4		1.25	1.20	"If I Could Build My Whole World Around You" (with Tammi Terrell)
4.5	3.2	2.01	1.24	"Chained"
4.6		2.02	1.22	"Ain't Nothing Like the Real Thing" (with Tammi Terrell)
4.7		2.03		"How Can I Forget"
5.1	3.4	2.05	1.25	"I Heard It Through The Grapevine"
5.2		2.06		"Good Lovin' Ain't Easy to Come By" (with Tammi Terrell)
5.3	3.5	2.07	1.26	"Too Busy Thinking About My Baby"
5.4	3.6	2.08	1.27	"That's the Way Love Is"
5.5	3.1	2.09	1.23	"You're All I Need to Get By" (with Tammi Terrell)
5.6		2.10		"The End of Our Road"
6.1	4.1	2.11	2.01*	"What's Going On"
6.2	4.2	2.12	2.03	"Mercy Mercy Me (The Ecology)"
6.3	4.3	2.13	2.04	"Inner City Blues (Make Me Wanna Holler)"
6.4	4.4	2.14		"Save the Children"
6.5		2.15		"You're the Man (Part 1)"
6.6	4.5	2.16	2.08	"Trouble Man"
	3.3			"You Ain't Livin' till You're Lovin'" (with Tammi Terrell)
	3.7			"The Onion Song" (with Tammi Terrell)
	3.8			"Abraham, Martin and John"
	4.6	2.17	2.09	"Let's Get It On"
	4.7			"You're a Special Part of Me" (with Diana Ross)
		2.04		"Heaven Sent You, I Know" (with Kim Weston)
		2.18	2.10	"Come Get to This"
		2.19	2.13	"Distant Lover (Live)"
		2.20	2.14	"I Want You"
		2.21	2.16	"Got to Give It Up (Part 1)"
		2.22	2.15	"After the Dance"
			1.14	"Sweeter as the Days Go By"
			1.18	"Sweet Thing" (Previously unreleased 1967 mix)
			2.02*	"God Is Love"
			2.05	"Sad Tomorrows"
			2.06	"You're the Man (Parts 1 and 2)"
			2.07	"The World Is Rated X" (Prev. unr. 1972 Mix)
			2.11	"Just to Keep You Satisfied"
			2.12	"My Mistake (Was to Love You)" (with Diana Ross)
			2.17	"When Did You Stop Loving Me, When Did I Stop Loving You"
			2.18	"Ego Tripping Out"
			2.19	"Praise"
			2.20	"Heavy Love Affair"
