= Inner City Blues: The Music of Marvin Gaye =

Compilation album by various artists
- Released: October 17, 1995
- Recorded: 1995
- Genre: R&B
- Length: 52:06
- Label: Motown
- Producer: Various producers

Professional ratings
Review scores
Source	Rating
Allmusic	2/5 stars

Inner City Blues: the Music of Marvin Gaye (also known as Inner City Blues: A Tribute to Marvin Gaye) is a tribute album to soul singer Marvin Gaye who died in 1984. It was released in 1995 on the Motown Records label. The album was not a success on the music charts and sales were low. Many critics panned the album, although, Allmusic stated "I Want You" was the album's standout track, and WBLS (New York) DJ Félix Hernández selected "Stubborn Kind of Fellow" as his choice in his yearly tribute to Marvin Gaye on his "Rhythm Revue" program.

An eclectic group of artists from Marvin's own daughter, Nona Gaye to the UK soul and pop diva, Lisa Stansfield's reading on "Just to Keep You Satisfied" to Bono's take on "Save the Children". The artists selected were, for the most part, some of the biggest stars of 1990s pop and soul.

== Track listing ==
1. "Inner City Blues (Make Me Wanna Holler)" – Nona Gaye
2. "Save the Children" – Bono
3. "Let's Get It On" – Boyz II Men
4. "I Want You" – Madonna and Massive Attack
5. "Trouble Man" – Neneh Cherry
6. "Just to Keep You Satisfied" – Lisa Stansfield
7. "Stubborn Kind of Fellow" – Stevie Wonder and For Real
8. "God Is Love"/"Mercy Mercy Me" – Sounds of Blackness
9. "Like Marvin Gaye Said (What's Going On)" – Speech
10. "Marvin, You're the Man" – Digable Planets
