= The Very Best of Marvin Gaye =

1994 and 2001 compilation albums by Marvin Gaye

The Very Best of Marvin Gaye is the title of two compilations (American and European) by Motown artist Marvin Gaye.

== UK edition ==
The Very Best of Marvin Gaye

Greatest hits album by Marvin Gaye
- Released: 1994
- Recorded: 1962–82
- Genres: R&B, soul, funk
- Length: 73:28
- Label: Motown
- Producers: Marvin Gaye, Norman Whitfield, Ashford & Simpson, William "Mickey" Stevenson, Hal Davis

Marvin Gaye chronology
Love Starved Heart: Rare and Unreleased (1994)	The Very Best of Marvin Gaye (1994)	The Master (1961–1984) (1995)

Singles from The Very Best of Marvin Gaye
- 1. "Lucky, Lucky Me" Released: 1994

Released in 1994, The Very Best is the best-selling (and highest charting) Marvin Gaye album in the UK – selling over 250,000 copies, peaking at #3 in the UK charts, and receiving a million-plus sales certificate in 2001. The album featured an unreleased track ("Lucky, Lucky Me") that would also be released as a single.

=== Track listing ===
1. "I Heard It Through the Grapevine" – 3:16
2. "What's Going On" – 3:51
3. "Sexual Healing" – 4:09
4. "You Are Everything" (with Diana Ross) – 3:07
5. "It Takes Two" (with Kim Weston) – 2:59
6. "Let's Get It On" – 4:01
7. "Abraham, Martin & John" – 4:18
8. "Too Busy Thinking About My Baby" – 2:56
9. "How Sweet It Is (To Be Loved by You)" – 2:59
10. "Mercy Mercy Me (The Ecology)" – 3:16
11. "Stop, Look, Listen (To Your Heart)" (with Diana Ross) – 2:55
12. "You're All I Need to Get By" (with Tammi Terrell) – 2:52
13. "Ain't Nothing Like the Real Thing" (with Tammi Terrell) – 2:17
14. "Wherever I Lay My Hat (That's My Home)" – 2:14
15. "The Onion Song" (with Tammi Terrell) – 3:01
16. "You Ain't Livin' Till You're Lovin'" (with Tammi Terrell) – 2:50
17. "Good Lovin' Ain't Easy to Come By" (with Tammi Terrell) – 2:29
18. "That's the Way Love Is" – 3:43
19. "Got to Give It Up, Pt. I" – 4:12
20. "When Did You Stop Loving Me, When Did I Stop Loving You" – 6:18
21. "Can I Get a Witness" – 2:50
22. "Lucky, Lucky Me" – 2:55

== US edition ==
The Very Best of Marvin Gaye

Greatest hits album by Marvin Gaye
- Released: July 17, 2001
- Recorded: 1962-82
- Genres: R&B, pop, soul, psychedelic soul, funk
- Length: 130:14
- Labels: Motown, Universal Music
- Producers: Marvin Gaye, Berry Gordy, Larkin Arnold, Jeff Moskow, Harry Weinger, Fonce Mizell, Freddie Perren, Smokey Robinson, Valerie Simpson, William "Mickey" Stevenson, Art Stewart, Ed Townsend, Norman Whitfield, Leon Ware, Nickolas Ashford, Johnny Bristol, Henry Cosby, Lamont Dozier, Harvey Fuqua, Brian Holland

Marvin Gaye chronology
The Final Concert (2000)	The Very Best of Marvin Gaye (2001)	The Complete Duets (2001)

Released in the US in 2001, the two disc edition is a chronological look back at American R&B/soul singer Marvin Gaye's three decade-plus music career throughout his tenure in Motown Records in the 1960s and 1970s concluding with his final big hit, 1982's "Sexual Healing" from his brief tenure with Columbia Records before the singer's death in 1984. Re-released later in 2005 under Universal Records' Gold series, it has since been certified gold by the Recording Industry Association of America.

Professional ratings
Review scores
Source	Rating
AllMusic	3.5/5 stars
Artist Direct	link
Robert Christgau	(A)
Tom Hull	A
Music Week	4/5 stars

=== Track listing ===
Disc One
No.	Title	Writer(s)	Origin	Length
1.	"Stubborn Kind of Fellow"	Marvin Gaye, William "Mickey" Stevenson, George Gordy	That Stubborn Kinda Fellow, 1962	2:45
2.	"Hitch Hike"	Gaye, Stevenson, Clarence Paul	That Stubborn Kinda Fellow	2:33
3.	"Pride and Joy"	Gaye, Stevenson, Norman Whitfield	That Stubborn Kinda Fellow	2:08
4.	"Can I Get a Witness"	Holland–Dozier–Holland	Greatest Hits, 1964	2:50
5.	"You're a Wonderful One"	Holland–Dozier–Holland	How Sweet It Is to Be Loved by You, 1965; released as a single the previous year	2:43
6.	"How Sweet It Is (To Be Loved By You)"	Holland–Dozier–Holland	How Sweet It Is to Be Loved by You	2:58
7.	"I'll Be Doggone"	Warren Moore, Smokey Robinson, Marvin Tarplin	Moods of Marvin Gaye, 1966	2:48
8.	"Ain't That Peculiar"	Moore, Robinson, Bobby Rogers, Tarplin	Moods of Marvin Gaye	3:00
9.	"It Takes Two" (with Kim Weston)	Sylvia Moy, Stevenson	Take Two, 1966	2:59
10.	"Ain't No Mountain High Enough" (with Tammi Terrell)	Nickolas Ashford, Valerie Simpson	United, 1967	2:28
11.	"Your Precious Love" (with Tammi Terrell)	Ashford, Simpson	United	3:05
12.	"If I Could Build My Whole World Around You" (with Tammi Terrell)	Harvey Fuqua, Johnny Bristol, Vernon Bullock	United	2:21
13.	"Ain't Nothing Like the Real Thing" (with Tammi Terrell)	Ashford, Simpson	You're All I Need, 1968	2:15
14.	"You're All I Need to Get By" (with Tammi Terrell)	Ashford, Simpson	You're All I Need	2:51
15.	"You"	Jeffrey Bowen, Jack Coga, Ivy Jo Hunter	I Heard It Through the Grapevine, 1968	2:27
16.	"I Heard It Through the Grapevine"	Barrett Strong, Whitfield	I Heard It Through the Grapevine	3:15
17.	"Too Busy Thinking About My Baby"	Janie Bradford, Whitfield, Strong	M.P.G., 1969	2:57
18.	"That's the Way Love Is"	Strong, Whitfield	M.P.G.; also released on the following year's album of the same name	3:44
19.	"His Eye Is on the Sparrow"	Civilla D. Martin, Charles H. Gabriel	In Loving Memory, 1968	3:48

Disc Two
No.	Title	Writer(s)	Origin	Length
1.	"What's Going On"	Al Cleveland, Gaye, Renaldo "Odie" Benson	What's Going On, 1971	3:52
2.	"Mercy Mercy Me (The Ecology)"	Gaye	What's Going On	3:13
3.	"Inner City Blues (Make Me Wanna Holler)"	Gaye, James Nyx Jr.	What's Going On	5:28
4.	"You're the Man, Pts. I & II"	Gaye, Kenneth Stover	Non-album single, 1972	5:48
5.	"Where Are We Going?"	Gaye, Larry Mizell	Previously unreleased, 1994; originally recorded for Let's Get It On, 1973	3:57
6.	"Trouble Man"	Gaye	Trouble Man soundtrack, 1972	3:51
7.	"Let's Get It On"	Gaye, Ed Townsend	Let's Get It On	4:53
8.	"Come Get to This"	Gaye	Let's Get It On	2:42
9.	"Distant Lover" (Live at the Oakland Coliseum, Oakland, California, January 4, 1974)	Gaye, Gwen Gordy, Sandra Greene	Marvin Gaye Live!, 1974; originally from Let's Get It On	6:19
10.	"I Want You" (Edited version)	Leon Ware, Arthur "T-Boy" Ross	I Want You, 1976	3:57
11.	"Got to Give It Up"	Gaye	Live at the London Palladium, 1977	11:53
12.	"Anger"	Delta Ashley, Gaye, Townsend	Here, My Dear, 1978	4:03
13.	"Ego Tripping Out"	Gaye	1994 re-release of In Our Lifetime (originally released in 1981)	7:14
14.	"Praise"	Gaye	In Our Lifetime	4:53
15.	"Sexual Healing" (Single version)	Odell Brown, Gaye, David Ritz	Midnight Love, 1982	3:59

== Charts ==
Chart performance for The Very Best of Marvin Gaye
Chart (2026)	Peak position
Greek Albums (IFPI)	88

== Certifications and sales ==
Region	Certification	Certified units/sales
Brazil	—	21,000
France (SNEP)	Gold	100,000^{*}
New Zealand (RMNZ)	Gold	7,500^{^}
United Kingdom (BPI)	3× Platinum	900,000^{‡}
United States (RIAA)	Gold	500,000^{^}
Summaries
Worldwide	—	5,000,000
^{*} Sales figures based on certification alone.^{^} Shipments figures based on certification alone.^{‡} Sales+streaming figures based on certification alone.
