= The Master (1961–1984) =

Box set by Marvin Gaye
- Released: April 25, 1995
- Recorded: 1961–1984
- Genres: R&B; soul; psychedelic soul; funk
- Length: 4:59:55
- Label: Motown
- Producers: William "Mickey" Stevenson; Brian Holland; Lamont Dozier; Smokey Robinson; Harvey Fuqua; Ashford & Simpson; Frank Wilson; Norman Whitfield; Marvin Gaye; Leon Ware; Hal Davis; Art Stewart

Marvin Gaye chronology
The Very Best of Marvin Gaye (1994)	The Master (1961–1984) (1995)	Anthology: Marvin Gaye (1995)

Professional ratings
Review scores
Source	Rating
AllMusic	4.5/5 stars
NME	10/10

The Master (1961–1984) is a chronological box set album looking back at American singer-songwriter Marvin Gaye's recording career spanning approximately 23 years. Spanning four discs, the box set goes over all portions of Gaye's career with a repertoire of themes including dance songs, love ballads, duets, socially conscious material, sensual material, spirituals, and autobiographical revelations. The set includes rarities such as a 1983 live recording of Gaye and Gladys Knight & the Pips each singing their seminal hit "I Heard It Through the Grapevine", Gaye's famed 1983 performance of "The Star-Spangled Banner" at an NBA All-Star game, and an a cappella performance of "The Lord's Prayer" taped during Gaye's exile in Belgium.

In 2006, Universal re-released the boxset as part of its Universal Earbook series, issuing it as an LP-sized hardback coffee table book.

== Track listing ==
=== Disc one ===
1. "Stubborn Kind of Fellow" – 2:45
2. "Pride and Joy" – 2:07
3. "Hitch Hike" – 2:33
4. "Wherever I Lay My Hat (That's My Home)" – 2:13
5. "What Do You Want With Him" (Previously unreleased) – 2:37
6. "Once Upon a Time" (with Mary Wells) – 2:32
7. "What's the Matter with You Baby" (with Mary Wells) – 2:23
8. "Can I Get a Witness" – 2:48
9. "Couldn't Ask for More" (Previously unreleased) – 2:42
10. "You're Wonderful" (Previously unreleased) – 2:45
11. "I Wonder" – 3:44
12. "You're a Wonderful One" – 2:45
13. "It's Got to Be Love" (Previously unreleased) – 2:39
14. "Try It Baby" – 3:00
15. "Leavin'" (Previously unreleased) – 2:22
16. "My Love for You" (Previously unreleased) – 3:00
17. "How Sweet It Is (To Be Loved by You)" – 2:59
18. "Baby Don't You Do It" – 2:33
19. "Just Like a Man" (Previously unreleased alternative mix) – 2:50
20. "Pretty Little Baby" – 2:36
21. "Talk About a Good Feeling" (Previously unreleased) – 2:24
22. "I'll Be Doggone" – 2:51
23. "Little Darling (I Need You)" – 2:46
24. "One More Heartache" – 2:34
25. "Ain't That Peculiar" – 2:59
26. "You're the One for Me" – 3:42
27. "Take This Heart of Mine" – 2:44
28. "Your Unchanging Love" – 3:03

=== Disc two ===
1. "It Takes Two" (with Kim Weston) – 2:58
2. "I Couldn't Help Falling for You" (with Kim Weston) (Previously unreleased) – 2:55
3. "Lonely Lover" (Previously unreleased) – 2:25
4. "Without Your Sweet Lovin'" (Previously unreleased) – 2:30
5. "Ain't No Mountain High Enough" (with Tammi Terrell) – 2:28
6. "If I Could Build My Whole World Around You" (with Tammi Terrell) – 2:22
7. "Your Precious Love" (with Tammi Terrell) – 3:00
8. "If This World Were Mine" (with Tammi Terrell) – 2:43
9. "Without You (My World Is Lonely)" (Previously unreleased) – 2:41
10. "Together We Stand (Divided We Fall)" (Previously unreleased) – 2:52
11. "You" – 2:26
12. "Chained" – 2:36
13. "I Heard It Through the Grapevine" – 3:14
14. "You're What's Happening (In the World Today)" – 2:20
15. "This Love Starved Heart of Mine (It's Killing Me)" – 2:42
16. "Ain't Nothing Like the Real Thing" (with Tammi Terrell) – 2:17
17. "Keep On Lovin' Me Honey" (with Tammi Terrell) – 2:30
18. "You're All I Need to Get By" (with Tammi Terrell) – 2:40
19. "Too Busy Thinking About My Baby" – 2:57
20. "More Than a Heart Can Stand" – 2:56
21. "How Can I Forget" – 2:04
22. "That's the Way Love Is" – 3:37
23. "Yesterday" – 3:25
24. "The End of Our Road" – 2:46
25. "Good Lovin' Ain't Easy to Come By" (with Valerie Simpson, credited to Tammi Terrell) – 2:19
26. "What You Gave Me" (with Valerie Simpson, credited to Tammi Terrell) – 2:37

=== Disc three ===
1. "What's Going On" – 3:53
2. "Save the Children" – 4:02
3. "Mercy Mercy Me (The Ecology)" – 3:16
4. "Inner City Blues (Make Me Wanna Holler)" – 5:29
5. "I'm Going Home" (Previously unreleased alternative mix) – 4:39
6. "Piece of Clay" (Previously unreleased) – 5:11
7. "You're the Man (Pt. I & II)" – 5:46
8. "Checking Out (Double Clutch)" (Previously unreleased) – 4:53
9. "Trouble Man" – 4:55
10. "Let's Get It On" – 4:53
11. "Come Get to This" – 2:41
12. "Just to Keep You Satisfied" – 4:27
13. "Pledging My Love" (with Diana Ross) – 3:35
14. "My Mistake (Was to Love You)" (with Diana Ross) – 2:55
15. "Distant Lover (Live)" – 6:22
16. "I Want You" – 4:34
17. "After the Dance" – 5:11

=== Disc four ===
1. "Got to Give It Up, Pt. I" – 4:14
2. "Here, My Dear" – 2:49
3. "When Did You Stop Loving Me, When Did I Stop Loving You" – 6:16
4. "Anger" – 4:02
5. "Anna's Song" – 5:55
6. "A Funky Space Reincarnation" – 8:18
7. "When Did You Stop Loving Me, When Did I Stop Loving You (Reprise)" – 0:45
8. "She Needs Me" (Previously unreleased) – 3:31
9. "Why Did I Choose You" (Previously unreleased) – 2:37
10. "Life Is for Learning" – 3:40
11. "Funk Me" – 5:35
12. "Love Me Now or Love Me Later" – 5:00
13. "Ego Tripping Out" – 5:13
14. "The Star-Spangled Banner" (Live) – 3:14
15. "I Heard It Through the Grapevine" (Live) (with Gladys Knight & The Pips) – 3:48
16. "Rockin' After Midnight" – 6:05
17. "Sexual Healing" – 4:04
18. "The Lord's Prayer" – 1:55
