= The Marvin Gaye Collection =

1990 box set by Marvin Gaye

Greatest hits album by Marvin Gaye
- Released: September 19, 1990
- Recorded: 1961–1983
- Genres: Funk, soul, R&B
- Length: 183:53
- Label: Motown

Marvin Gaye chronology
Love Songs (1988)	The Marvin Gaye Collection (1990)	Missing You – The Best of Marvin Gaye (1990)

The Marvin Gaye Collection is a retrospective compilation of Marvin Gaye recordings released by Motown Records on September 19, 1990. The box set is divided into four categories and contains more than eighty songs. It features thirty-four previously unreleased recordings, including the sessions from 1979's The Ballads (later released as Vulnerable in 1997).

The set is out of print, usurped by 1995's The Master (1961–1984).

== Track listing ==
=== Disc One (20 Top 20s) ===
1. "Stubborn Kind of Fellow" - 2:49
2. "Hitch Hike" - 2:32
3. "Pride and Joy" - 2:28
4. "Can I Get a Witness" - 2:47
5. "You're a Wonderful One" - 2:46
6. "Try It Baby" - 2:59
7. "How Sweet It Is (To Be Loved by You)" - 2:55
8. "I'll Be Doggone" - 2:47
9. "Ain't That Peculiar" - 2:57
10. "I Heard It Through the Grapevine" - 3:12
11. "Too Busy Thinking About My Baby" - 2:53
12. "That's the Way Love Is" - 3:39
13. "What's Going On" - 3:50
14. "Mercy Mercy Me (The Ecology)" - 3:13
15. "Inner City Blues (Make Me Wanna Holler)" - 3:04
16. "Trouble Man" - 3:39
17. "Let's Get It On" (Single version) - 4:00
18. "I Want You" - 3:55
19. "Got to Give It Up" (Single version) - 4:12
20. "Sexual Healing" - 3:58

=== Disc two (The Duets) ===
1. "Once Upon a Time" - 2:28
2. "What's the Matter with You Baby" - 2:19
3. "I'm Yours, You're Mine" - 2:07
4. "All I Got" - 3:12
5. "You Can Dance" - 2:17
  - Tracks 1–5 performed with Mary Wells
6. "Rilleh" - 2:32
7. "So Good to Be Loved by You" - 2:23
8. "Was It a Dream" - 3:12
9. "Steadies" - 2:23
  - Tracks 6–9 performed with Oma Page
10. "It Takes Two" - 2:56
11. "Exactly Like You" - 2:41
12. "Teach Me Tonight" - 3:15
13. "Let's Do It (Let's Fall in Love)" - 2:22
14. "It's Me" - 2:49
  - Tracks 10–14 performed with Kim Weston
15. "Ain't No Mountain High Enough" - 2:26
16. "Your Precious Love" - 2:59
17. "If I Could Build My Whole World Around You" - 2:20
18. "If This World Were Mine" - 2:41
19. "Ain't Nothing Like the Real Thing" - 2:15
20. "You're All I Need to Get By" - 2:39
  - Tracks 15–20 performed with Tammi Terrell
21. "You Are Everything" - 3:07
22. "You're a Special Part of Me" - 4:37
23. "My Mistake (Was to Love You)" - 3:02
24. "Don't Knock My Love" - 2:16
  - Tracks 21–24 performed with Diana Ross
25. "Pops, We Love You" - 3:51
  - Performed with Diana Ross, Smokey Robinson and Stevie Wonder

=== Disc three (Rare, Live and Unreleased) ===
1. "Let Your Conscience Be Your Guide" - 3:02
2. "Never Let You Go (Sha Lu Bop)" - 2:44
3. "It's Party Time" - 2:36
4. "The Christmas Song (Chestnuts Roasting on an Open Fire)" (Live from the Apollo) - 2:22
5. "Down and Under When You Limbo" - 2:43
6. "My Girl" - 2:42
7. "It's Not Unusual" - 2:21
8. "Sunny" - 2:57
9. "Sweeter as the Days Go By" - 2:50
10. "Sweet Thing" - 3:09
11. "I Love You Secretly (aka 'My Last Chance')" - 4:33
12. "I Want to Come Home for Christmas" - 4:41
13. "5, 10, 15, 20 Years of Love" - 2:41
14. "You're My Everything (aka 'I'd Give My Life for You)" - 3:29
15. "Come Get to This" (Live at the Alameda County Coliseum, Oakland, California) - 2:56
16. "Distant Lover" (Live at the Alameda County Coliseum, Oakland, California) - 6:15
17. "Jan" (Live at the Alameda County Coliseum, Oakland, California) - 3:10
18. "'60s Hits Medley" (Live from the London Palladium, London, England) - 8:50
19. "Star Spangled Banner" (Live from the 1983 NBA All-Star Game) - 3:13

=== Disc four (The Balladeer) ===
1. "I've Grown Accustomed to Her Face" - 3:28
2. "Straighten Up and Fly Right" - 2:21
3. "Too Young" - 3:45
4. "Mona Lisa" - 3:00
5. "It's Only a Paper Moon" - 2:23
6. "What Kind of Fool Am I?" - 3:39
7. "The Days of Wine and Roses" - 3:35
8. "Mack the Knife" - 2:57
9. "Hello Young Lovers" - 2:34
10. "Happy Days Are Here Again" - 2:45
11. "Why Did I Choose You" - 2:34
12. "She Needs Me" - 3:24
13. "Funny" - 2:42
14. "This Will Make You Laugh" - 2:52
15. "The Shadow of Your Smile" - 3:01
16. "I Wish I Didn't Love You So" - 2:27
17. "I Won't Cry Anymore" - 2:51
