= The Norman Whitfield Sessions =

Greatest hits album by Marvin Gaye
- Released: 1994
- Recorded: 1962–1969
- Genre: R&B, soul, psychedelic soul, funk
- Label: Motown
- Producer: Norman Whitfield

Marvin Gaye chronology
| For Adults Only (1992) | The Norman Whitfield Sessions (1994) | Love Starved Heart: Rare and Unreleased (1994) |

The Norman Whitfield Sessions is compilation album of songs by Marvin Gaye from 1962 to 1969. The album covers the Norman Whitfield-produced sessions of soul singer Marvin Gaye's late sixties period as he moved away from teen pop-driven R&B songs that made him a pop star. It covers more mature, grittier and funkier material as Whitfield guided the direction of Gaye's career, the high point being the 1968 song, "I Heard It Through the Grapevine", which became Gaye's first international smash. Other hits during that period included the more upbeat "Too Busy Thinking About My Baby", the darker "That's the Way Love Is" and "The End of Our Road". The collection includes "Wherever I Lay My Hat", which Whitfield co-penned and produced with Gaye on his That Stubborn Kinda Fellow; the song was covered by British singer Paul Young. There are covers of rock songs such as "Groovin'", "Yesterday", "Abraham, Martin & John" and two Temptations covers ("Cloud Nine" and "I Wish It Would Rain").

== Track listing ==
1. "True, True Loving" (Previously unreleased)
2. "Me and My Lonely Room"
3. "Wherever I Lay My Hat"
4. "I Heard It Through the Grapevine"
5. "Gonna Give Her All the Love I Got"
6. "Yesterday"
7. "Groovin'"
8. "Gonna Keep on Tryin' Till I Win Your Love"
9. "That's the Way Love Is"
10. "Abraham, Martin & John"
11. "How Can I Forget"
12. "No Time for Tears"
13. "I Wish It Would Rain" (B-side of "Let's Get It On")
14. "Cloud Nine"
15. "Don't You Miss Me a Little Bit Baby"
16. "So Long"
17. "Too Busy Thinking About My Baby"
18. "The End of Our Road"
