= You're the Man =

You're the Man may refer to:

- "You're the Man" (song), a 1972 single by Marvin Gaye
- You're the Man (album), a 1972 album by Marvin Gaye, released posthumously in 2019
