= The Final Concert =

The Final Concert may refer to:

- The Final Concert (The Kingston Trio album)
- The Final Concert (Marvin Gaye album)
- Final Concert 10-28-14 (The Allman Brothers Band album)
