= Pretty Little Baby =

Pretty Little Baby may refer to:

- "Pretty Little Baby" (Connie Francis song), 1962
- "Pretty Little Baby" (Marvin Gaye song), 1965
