= The Final Concert (Marvin Gaye album) =

Live album by Marvin Gaye
- Released: 2000
- Recorded: 1983
- Genre: R&B, soul
- Label: The Right Stuff

Marvin Gaye chronology
Marvin Gaye: The Love Songs (2000)	The Final Concert (2000)	The Very Best of Marvin Gaye (2001)

The Final Concert is a 2000 release of a 1983 show in Indianapolis. It is not the last concert from Marvin Gaye's final tour, but is the last one recorded.

== Track list ==
1. "Third World Girl" M.Gaye
2. "I Heard It Through the Grapevine" Barrett Strong / Norman Whitfield
3. "Come Get to This" Marvin Gaye
4. "Let's Get It On" Marvin Gaye / Ed Townsend
5. "What's Going On" Renaldo Benson / Al Cleveland / Marvin Gaye
6. "Joy (Dedication to My Father)" Marvin Gaye
7. Medley: "Ain't Nothing Like the Real Thing" / "Heaven Must Have Sent You" Nick Ashford / Harvey Fuqua / Marvin Gaye / Valerie Simpson Marvin Gaye feat. Paulette McWilliams
8. "Inner City Blues (Make Me Wanna Holler)" Marvin Gaye / James Nyx, Jr. / James Nyx
9. "Distant Lover" Gwen Fuqua / Marvin Gaye / Sandra Greene
10. "Sexual Healing" Odell Brown / Marvin Gaye / David Ritz
