= Marvin Gaye: The Love Songs =

Compilation album by Marvin Gaye
- Released: January 2000
- Recorded: 1964–1982
- Genre: Soul
- Length: 62:00
- Label: Motown, Universal Music TV
- Producer: Marvin Gaye, Harvey Fuqua, Johnny Bristol, Nickolas Ashford, Valerie Simpson, Norman Whitfield, Hal Davis

Marvin Gaye chronology
Midnight Love & The Sexual Healing Sessions (1998)	Marvin Gaye: The Love Songs (2000)	The Final Concert (2000)

Marvin Gaye: The Love Songs is a 2000 compilation album recorded by Motown singer Marvin Gaye. Included are his UK hits, "Abraham, Martin & John", his two duets with Diana Ross: "You Are Everything" and "Stop, Look, Listen (To Your Heart)" and his international hits including "I Heard It Through the Grapevine", "What's Going On" and "Sexual Healing". The album was only released in the United Kingdom, where it peaked at number eight on the UK albums chart.

== Track listing ==
1. "I Heard It Through the Grapevine"
2. "Sexual Healing"
3. "Abraham, Martin & John"
4. "Let's Get It On"
5. "You Are Everything" (w/Diana Ross)
6. "Too Busy Thinking About My Baby"
7. "What's Going On"
8. "Stop, Look, Listen (To Your Heart)" (w/Diana Ross)
9. "It Takes Two" (w/Kim Weston)
10. "You're All I Need to Get By" (w/Tammi Terrell)
11. "Mercy Mercy Me (The Ecology)"
12. "Ain't Nothing Like the Real Thing" (w/Tammi Terrell)
13. "Trouble Man"
14. "Wherever I Lay My Hat (That's My Home)"
15. "Got to Give It Up"
16. "That's the Way Love Is"
17. "I Want You"
18. "How Sweet It Is (To Be Loved By You)"
19. "You're a Wonderful One"
