= The World Is Rated X =

Single by Marvin Gaye

from the album Motown Remembers Marvin Gaye: Never Before Released Masters
- B-side: "Lonely Lover"
- Released: 1986
- Recorded: 1972, Motown Recording Studios, Hollywood, California
- Genre: Funk, soul
- Length: 6:27
- Label: Motown
- Songwriters: Ezra Bolton, Marilyn McLeod, Mel Bolton and Robert Gordy
- Producer: Hal Davis

Marvin Gaye singles chronology
"Just Like" (1985)	"The World Is Rated X" (1986)	"My Last Chance" (1991)

"The World Is Rated X" is a socially conscious song recorded by Marvin Gaye culled from sessions of the shelved You're the Man project from 1972, later issued on the Motown compilation album, Motown Remembers Marvin Gaye: Never Before Released Masters and released as a promotional single in 1986.

== Overview ==
Gaye originally recorded the song in 1972 as he was working on a wide variety of projects. The song had two distinct versions. The initial recording was later issued as a single to promote a compilation album in 1986, while an alternate vocal version would later be included in the Deluxe Edition reissue of Let's Get It On in 2001. Gaye had originally planned to release the song on the album You're the Man, but due to Motown's mild response to that album's title track, it was never released, and Gaye later released Let's Get It On instead.

In 1986, Motown, having helped Columbia Records feature songs on two posthumous studio albums, decided to release more Gaye recordings from the singer's Motown archives. This song was included along with other songs, including Gaye's original recording of the Ashford & Simpson composition, "Dark Side of the World", later recorded by Diana Ross on her self titled debut solo album. While Gaye's 1960s recordings were overdubbed with 1980s production, the singer's 1970s recordings, including this song, were left in their original versions. The song was produced by longtime Motown producer Hal Davis, who was to be the second producer on You're the Man, as he had helped produce other Gaye songs from the sessions, including "Piece of Clay" and "Where Are We Going?"

Recorded in a funk style, it was a biting diatribe of the inner city, much like a previous Gaye track, "Inner City Blues (Make Me Wanna Holler)". in which Gaye delivered in a gospel sermon-inspired vocal, with backup from strings, horns, a solo saxophone riff, and a rhythm section.

To promote the compilation, Motown issued "The World Is Rated X" as a promotional single. It failed to make any chart. It was then issued on Gaye's Anthology set in 1995. The alternate vocal version of the song was released on the Deluxe Edition reissue of Let's Get It On six years later.

== Chart performance ==
The song peaked at number 95 on the UK singles chart.
