= My Last Chance =

1990 song by Marvin Gaye

Single by Marvin Gaye

from the album The Marvin Gaye Collection
- Released: 1990
- Recorded: 1970–1972; 1990 (single version overdubs)
- Genre: Soul
- Length: 4:05
- Label: Tamla
- Songwriter: Marvin Gaye
- Producer: Marvin Gaye

Marvin Gaye singles chronology
"The World Is Rated X" (1986)	"My Last Chance" (1990)	"Lucky, Lucky Me" (1994)

"My Last Chance" is a song by American recording artist Marvin Gaye. Gaye originally recorded the song as an instrumental in 1970, during the Detroit sessions of What's Going On. In 1972, while recording the album Let's Get It On in Los Angeles, he added vocals. A short time after, the song was revised, with his wife, Anna Gordy Gaye, and his collaborator, Elgie Stover, as "I Love You Secretly" for The Miracles' 1973 album, Renaissance.

The original unrevised version first appeared as "I Love You Secretly (a.k.a. My Last Chance)" on the box set The Marvin Gaye Collection, September 1990. A single version, titled "My Last Chance", with a then-modern R&B-styled quiet storm production, was issued the same year on 7-inch vinyl and cassette, which gave Gaye his first charted Billboard single as a posthumous artist in five years, peaking at number 16 on the Hot R&B Singles & Tracks chart.

In 2001, the original unrevised version, issued on The Marvin Gaye Collection, was included in the compilation The Best of Marvin Gaye - Volume 2: The 1970s as part of the 20th Century Masters series.

On February 8, 2019, a new mix by Salaam Remi was released online as a promotion for an upcoming posthumous album. On March 29 of the same year, the "Remi Mix" was released on Gaye's fourth posthumous album, You're the Man.

== Personnel ==
Original:

- All vocals by Marvin Gaye.
- Instrumentation by The Funk Brothers.
- Produced by Marvin Gaye.

Single version:

- Vocals by Marvin Gaye.
- Vocal overdubs by The Waters.
- Instrumental and vocal overdubs produced by Steve Lindsey and Zack Vaz.
