= A Motown Christmas =

Compilation album by various artists
- Released: September 25, 1973
- Genres: Bubblegum pop; R&B; soul; Christmas
- Length: 75:34
- Label: Motown

A Motown Christmas is a Christmas music compilation album, originally released as a 2-LP set by Motown Records on September 25, 1973. It contains various seasonal singles and album tracks recorded by some of the label's artists from the 1960s and early 1970s. Some of the music had previously been released on the 1968 compilation Merry Christmas from Motown.

The music has several times been recycled into different packagings. In 1992, the album was reissued on compact disc, with all 24 tracks from the original album on one CD. In 1999, a new single-CD version was released, with a bonus track by Marvin Gaye added ("I Want to Come Home for Christmas").

A second compilation, A Motown Christmas, Volume 2, was issued on CD in 2001.

== Track listing ==
Side 1

1. "Santa Claus Is Comin' to Town" – The Jackson 5
2. "What Christmas Means to Me" – Stevie Wonder
3. "Rudolph the Red-Nosed Reindeer" – The Temptations
4. "My Favorite Things" – The Supremes
5. "Deck the Halls/Bring a Torch, Jeanette, Isabella" – Smokey Robinson
6. "I Saw Mommy Kissing Santa Claus" – The Jackson 5

Side 2

1. "Ave Maria" – Stevie Wonder
2. "Silent Night" – The Temptations
3. "Little Christmas Tree" – Michael Jackson
4. "God Rest Ye Merry, Gentlemen" – Smokey Robinson
5. "The Christmas Song" – The Jackson 5
6. "Joy to the World" – The Supremes

Side 3

1. "The Little Drummer Boy" – The Temptations
2. "Silver Bells" – The Supremes
3. "Someday at Christmas" – Stevie Wonder
4. "Frosty the Snowman" – The Jackson 5
5. "Jingle Bells" – Smokey Robinson
6. "My Christmas Tree" – The Temptations

Side 4

1. "White Christmas" – The Supremes
2. "One Little Christmas Tree" – Stevie Wonder
3. "Give Love on Christmas Day" – The Jackson 5
4. "It's Christmas Time" – Smokey Robinson
5. "Children's Christmas Song" – The Supremes
6. "Have Yourself a Merry Little Christmas" – The Jackson 5
