= Love Starved Heart: Rare and Unreleased =

Greatest hits album by Marvin Gaye
- Released: 1994; 1999 (Expanded)
- Recorded: 1963–1969
- Genre: Soul, psychedelic soul
- Length: 45:33; 66:15 (Expanded)
- Label: Motown
- Producer: William "Mickey" Stevenson; Berry Gordy; Ivy Jo Hunter; Johnny Bristol; Brian Holland; Lamont Dozier; Smokey Robinson; Clarence Paul; Frank Wilson; Ashford & Simpson; Marvin Gaye

Marvin Gaye chronology
The Norman Whitfield Sessions (1994)	Love Starved Heart: Rare and Unreleased (1994)	The Very Best of Marvin Gaye (1994)

Expanded Edition

Professional ratings
Review scores
Source	Rating
Allmusic	3/5 stars

Love Starved Heart: Rare and Unreleased is a compilation album by Marvin Gaye. Released in 1994 on Motown Records, the collection features some rarities from the soul singer's catalog during his formative years in the label between his breakthrough year as an R&B star in 1963 to around the time of his late-1960s hits including "I Heard It through the Grapevine". Covering material he worked on with figures such as Holland-Dozier-Holland, Smokey Robinson and William "Mickey" Stevenson, the disc showcases Gaye's growth as a vocalist. In 1999, an expanded version was released under the title Lost and Found: Love Starved Heart, including bonus tracks and a rare interview.

== Track listing ==
1. "It's a Desperate Situation" (Ivy Jo Hunter, Pam Sawyer) (3:05)
2. "I Found Something" (Frank Wilson) (2:22)
3. "When I Feel the Need" (Nickolas Ashford, Valerie Simpson) (3:14)
4. "This Love Starved Heart of Mine (It's Killing Me)" (Kay Lewis, Helen Lewis) (2:40)
5. "You're a Son of a Gun" (Anna Gordy Gaye, George Gordy, Allen Story) (2:27)
6. "For Us Both I'll Be Concerned" (Anna Gordy Gaye, George Gordy, Allen Story) (2:37)
7. "Darling You're Wonderful" (David Hamilton, Clarence O. Paul) (2:10)
8. "Sad Souvenirs" (Hunter, William "Mickey" Stevenson) (2:39)
9. "I Can't Help It (I Love You)" (Hunter) (3:21)
10. "It's a Lonely World Without Your Love" (Hunter, Stevenson) (2:17)
11. "Say When" (Johnny Bristol) (2:36)
12. "Lucky, Lucky Me" (Henry Cosby, Hunter, Sylvia Moy, Verdi) (2:49)
13. "Get Away Heartbreak (Keep on Moving)" (Bullock, Bristol, Mannis) (3:23)
14. "Court of the Common Plea" (Gaye, Gaye, Stover) (2:56)
15. "You Make Me Do Things (I Don't Want to Do)" (Cosby, Guillemette, Hinton) (3:13)
16. "Hope I Don't Get My Heart Broke" (Cosby, Guillemette, Hinton) (3:34)

1999 expanded edition bonus tracks

1. "You're the One" (Gaye, Gaye, Stover) (3:17)
2. "Dark Side of the World" (Ashford, Simpson) (3:05)
3. "I'm in Love with You" (Broadnax, Paul) (2:57)
4. "Just a Little Love (Before My Life Is Gone)" (Hunter, Stevenson) (2:45)
5. "Baby I'm Glad That Things Work Out So Well" (Moore, Robinson, Tarplin) (3:01)
6. "Hanging On" (Hunter, Stevenson) (2:43)
7. "Gotta Say It, Gonna Tell It Like It Is" (Holland–Dozier–Holland) (2:20)
8. "Love's More Precious Than Gold" (Hamilton, Stevenson) (2:52)
9. "Loving and Affection" (Gaye, Grant, Paul) (2:28)
10. "Marvin Gaye Interview Excerpt" (1:00)

== Credits ==
- Lead vocals by Marvin Gaye
- Background vocals by Marvin Gaye, The Andantes, The Originals, The Love Tones, The Supremes, Jimmy Beavers and Ashford & Simpson
- Instrumentation by The Funk Brothers and the Detroit Symphony Orchestra
