= What's Going On Live =

Live album by Marvin Gaye (recorded 1972; released 2019)

Live album by Marvin Gaye
- Released: October 18, 2019
- Recorded: May 1, 1972
- Venue: John F. Kennedy Center for the Performing Arts; Washington, D. C., United States
- Genre: Soul
- Length: 63:58
- Language: English
- Label: Motown
- Producer: Beth Stempel; Harry Weinger

Marvin Gaye chronology
You're the Man (2019)	What's Going On Live (2019)

What's Going On Live is a live album recorded in 1972 by American soul singer Marvin Gaye and released posthumously in 2019 by Motown. The album documents a live performance of his album What's Going On and has received mixed feedback from critics.

== Recording and release ==
The songs on this album were recorded at Washington D.C.’s John F. Kennedy Center for the Performing Arts on May 1, 1972 as part of a Marvin Gaye Day celebration; it was the first live performance he had done in four years, since the death of his singing partner Tammi Terrell. Gaye was very hesitant about the performance and had to be talked into it by his mother: he was still grieving Terrell and disliked performing live anyway. The recording was previously released on the 2001 Deluxe Edition of What's Going On but this is the first edition of the concert as a standalone album and has a new mix; it comes shortly after Motown's release of You're the Man, a studio album intended to follow What's Going On but shelved for decades. Gaye resumed touring in 1974 but this was the only time that he performed the entire album live in one show. However the recording misses his performance of “Mercy Mercy Me (The Ecology)”, which was missed due to a technical error.

== Reception ==
The editorial staff of AllMusic Guide gave What's Going On Live three out of five stars, with reviewer Andy Kellman noting that the performance is generally tentative and that it is "basically a rehearsal in front of a rapt and vocal audience" but praising Gaye by writing that his "voice sounds unaffected by years away from the stage".

== Track listing ==
1. Sixties medley: "That's the Way Love Is"/"You"/"I Heard It Through the Grapevine"/"Little Darling (I Need You)"/"You're All I Need to Get By"/"Ain't Nothing Like the Real Thing"/"Your Precious Love"/"Pride and Joy"/"Stubborn Kind of Fellow" (Barrett Strong and Norman Whitfield / Jeffrey Bowen, Jack Goga, and Ivy Jo Hunter / Strong and Whitfield / Lamont Dozier, Brian Holland, and Eddie Holland / Nickolas Ashford and Valerie Simpson / Ashford and Simpson / Ashford and Simpson / Marvin Gaye, William "Mickey" Stevenson, and Whitfield / M. Gaye, George Gordy, and Stevenson) – 13:24
2. "Right On" (Earl DeRouen and M. Gaye) – 7:34
3. "Wholy Holy" (Renaldo Benson, Al Cleveland, and M. Gaye) – 3:31
4. "Inner City Blues (Make Me Wanna Holler)" (M. Gaye and James Nyx) – 9:06
5. "What's Going On" (Benson, Cleveland, and M. Gaye) – 5:41
6. "What's Happening Brother" (Gaye and Nyx) – 2:54
7. "Flyin' High (In The Friendly Sky)" (Anna Gordy Gaye, M. Gaye, and Elgie Stover) – 3:49
8. "Save the Children" (Benson, Cleveland, and M. Gaye) – 4:21
9. "God Is Love" (A. Gaye, M. Gaye, Nyx, and Stover) – 1:44
10. Stage dialogue – 2:33
11. "Inner City Blues (Make Me Wanna Holler)" (Reprise) (M. Gaye and Nyx) – 5:10
12. "What's Going On" (Reprise) (Benson, Cleveland, and M. Gaye) – 4:11

== Personnel ==
- Marvin Gaye – vocals, piano

Additional musicians

- The Andantes – backing vocals
  - Louvain Demps – soprano
  - Marlene Barrow – mezzo-soprano
  - Jackie Hicks – contralto
- Robert White – guitar
- George Baker – guitar
- Eddie "Bongo" Brown – bongos, congas
- James Jamerson – bass guitar
- Uriel Jones – drums
- Jack Ashford – glockenspiel, kazoo, percussion
- Maurice King – conductor
- David Van De Pitte – arrangement

Gaye was also supplemented by a 20-piece brass and string band, led by King

Technical personnel

- Alex Abrash – mastering at AA Mastering
- Jo Almeida – photo coordination
- Bob Gratts – engineering
- Matthew Lewis – cover photo
- John Morales – mixing at M+M Mix Studios
- Meire Murakami – design
- David Ritz – liner notes
- Beth Stempel – production
- Vartan – art direction
- Harry Weinger – re-release production
