= Motown Remembers Marvin Gaye: Never Before Released Masters =

Compilation album by Marvin Gaye
- Released: 1986
- Recorded: 1963–1972; 1985 (overdubbing)
- Genre: Soul, R&B, pop
- Length: 40:24
- Label: Motown
- Producer: Hal Davis

Marvin Gaye chronology
Romantically Yours (1985)	Motown Remembers Marvin Gaye: Never Before Released Masters (1986)	A Musical Testament: 1964-1984 (1988)

Singles from Motown Remembers Marvin Gaye: Never Before Released Masters
- 1. "The World Is Rated X" Released: 1986

Motown Remembers Marvin Gaye: Never Before Released Masters is a posthumous compilation album featuring the singer's unreleased recordings dating from 1963 to 1972 when Gaye was recording with Motown Records. Many of the records featured are overdubbed with eighties-styled drum programming and featured background vocalists whereas original recordings of the songs feature no background vocals and the instrumentation was more live than what is featured in this collection which was produced within a year after Gaye's 1984 death.

== Track listing ==
1. "The World Is Rated X" – 6:27
2. "Lonely Lover" – 2:37
3. "Just Like a Man" – 3:06
4. "I'm Going Home" – 3:41
5. "No Greater Love" – 3:38
6. "Dark Side of the World" – 3:34
7. "Loving and Affection" – 2:35
8. "I'm in Love with You" – 2:56
9. "That's the Way It Goes" – 3:06
10. "I Gotta Have Your Lovin'" – 2:50
11. "Baby I'm Glad That Things Worked Out So Well" – 3:10
12. "Baby (Don't You Leave Me)" (with Kim Weston) – 2:28

=== Alternate tracklisting ===
"I Heard It Through the Grapevine" (4:44) was added as the opening track to the German pressing.
