= I Want to Come Home for Christmas =

1972 song by Marvin Gaye

Single by Marvin Gaye
- B-side: "Christmas in the City"
- Released: 1990
- Recorded: 1972
- Studio: Hitsville West, Los Angeles, California
- Genre: Soul, R&B, doo-wop
- Length: 3:29 (short version); 4:41 (long version)
- Label: Tamla
- Songwriters: Marvin Gaye; Forest Hairston
- Producer: Marvin Gaye

Marvin Gaye singles chronology
"Trouble Man" (1972)	"I Want to Come Home for Christmas" (1990)	"Let's Get It On" (1973)

"I Want to Come Home for Christmas" is a holiday song written by Marvin Gaye and Forest Hairston in 1972. Produced during the Vietnam War, the song is written from the perspective of a prisoner of war and has an anti-war theme. Though Gaye recorded it in 1972, the recording was not released until 1990, six years after his death.

== Overview ==
=== Recording ===
The idea of the song came to Forest Hairston after seeing pictures of people tying yellow ribbons around trees for Vietnam War troops who were POWs. The song was unfinished when Hairston's friend Marvin Gaye made an unexpected visit to Hairston's apartment, when "messing with a song" in tribute to the Vietnam troops. Gaye was interested in a holiday song of his own had Hairston play it. Gaye stopped him mid-track and began to collaborate, adding in melody and harmony parts.

Later, Gaye would continue working on it at the Motown Recording Studios' Hitsville West in Los Angeles. Gaye would produce the track solo and record it in one take. Gaye returned to Hairston's apartment for him to take a listen. Hairston heard it, immediately hugged Gaye complimenting him on his talents, then Gaye laughed.

=== Issues with Motown and later releases ===
The song was intended for a Christmas-themed album by Gaye scheduled for late 1972. Tamla issued catalog number T-323L for the project, but the album was never released. There were also plans to issue the song as a single, Tamla catalog number 54229, but this was also shelved.

The recording finally saw release in 1990 as part of the box set The Marvin Gaye Collection, with a listed running time of 4:41. A shorter version of the song, listed at 3:29, first appeared on the Motown holiday compilation album Christmas in the City in 1993. The shorter version was also included as a bonus track on the 1999 CD reissue of A Motown Christmas, but not on the LP version. The longer version also appears on You're the Man, another album recorded by Gaye in 1972 that remained unreleased during his lifetime. Since 1990, the recording has been included in numerous other compilations.

The B-side of the planned 1972 single was an instrumental called "Christmas in the City", which prominently features a Moog synthesizer that Gaye had recently gotten from Stevie Wonder. It remained unreleased until the Christmas in the City compilation in 1993. Like "I Want to Come Home for Christmas", it was also included on You're the Man, and has appeared in other compilations.

=== Legacy ===
Hairston would recall he received a royalty check from the song a few years later after the album's release. Critics would later label it as a "masterpiece". Ever since 1990, especially during the Iraq War, Gaye's song has become a staple on playlists for R&B radio stations during the Christmas season.

== Credits ==
- All vocals by Marvin Gaye
- Instruments by The Funk Brothers and Marvin Gaye
- Written by Forest Hairston and Marvin Gaye
- Produced and arranged by Marvin Gaye

== Charts ==
Chart (1972–2017)	Peak position
Sweden Heatseeker (Sverigetopplistan)	18
