= Lucky, Lucky Me =

Single by Marvin Gaye

from the album The Very Best of Marvin Gaye
- Released: 1994
- Recorded: 1964, Detroit
- Genre: Soul
- Length: 2:54 (album)
- Label: Tamla
- Songwriter(s): William Stevenson; Henry Cosby; Sylvia Moy; Ivy Hunter
- Producer(s): Ivy Hunter

Marvin Gaye singles chronology
"My Last Chance" (1991)	"Lucky, Lucky Me" (1994)	"This Love Starved Heart of Mine(It's Killing Me)" (1995)

"Lucky, Lucky Me" is a song recorded by American singer-songwriter Marvin Gaye and produced by Ivy Jo Hunter. Gaye originally recorded the song in 1964, but the song was shelved by Motown staff. When Motown's UK department, Tamla-Motown, issued The Very Best of Marvin Gaye, the label included the song as the final song in the track listing. Following, positive buzz from Marvin's fans in England, Tamla-Motown released the song as a single in the UK where it reached number sixty-seven on the UK Singles Chart in 1994 giving Gaye his fourth posthumous hit, a decade after his death.

== Critical reception ==
Alan Jones from Music Week gave the song three out of five, writing, "A minor Gaye classic that has lain low until now, this soulful artefact has been overhauled for the Nineties, with restrained and sympathetic new instrumentation and vocals. It stands every chance of being a Top 40 hit." Pan-European magazine Music & Media commented, "Can you believe that one time they threw song like these in the bin, because they had better ones? Found behind the skirting board while sweeping the studio, it's now on Gaye's new sampler."

== Track listing ==
1. "Lucky, Lucky Me" (Extended Mix) - 5:45
2. "Lucky, Lucky Me" (Instrumental) - 5:02
3. "Lucky, Lucky Me" (Radio Edit) - 3:20
4. "Lucky, Lucky Me" (The '65 Ragga Vibe Mix) - 5:36
5. "Lucky, Lucky Me" (Jazz Mix) - 3:05
6. "Lucky, Lucky Me" (Ragga Vibe-No Rap) - 5:00

== Charts ==
Chart (1994)	Peak position
UK Singles (OCC)	67
UK Airplay (Music Week)	34
UK Club Chart (Music Week)	56

== Credits ==
- Lead vocal by Marvin Gaye
- Background vocals by The Andantes
- Instrumentation by The Funk Brothers and the Detroit Symphony Orchestra
