= You're the Man (album) =

Studio album by Marvin Gaye
- Released: March 29, 2019
- Recorded: 1972
- Studio: Golden World, Detroit & Hitsville West, Los Angeles, California
- Genre: Soul; funk
- Length: 1:08:59
- Label: Motown; Universal Music Enterprises; Universal
- Producer: Marvin Gaye; Hal Davis; Gloria Jones; Pamela Sawyer; Fonce Mizell; Freddie Perren; Willie Hutch

Marvin Gaye chronology
Collected (2014)	You're the Man (2019)	What's Going On Live (2019)

You're the Man is the fourth posthumous studio album by American singer Marvin Gaye, originally intended to be released in 1972 as the follow-up to What's Going On. It was released on March 29, 2019, through Motown, Universal Music Enterprises, and Universal Music Group to celebrate what would have been Gaye's 80th birthday on April 2, 2019. The album includes the single of the same name, as well as the intended original album in full and other songs Gaye recorded at the time.

Salaam Remi's mix of "My Last Chance" was released in promotion of the album on February 8, 2019.

Motown followed this release a few months later with the digital Expanded Edition of the album, which included three bonus tracks; "Head Title a.k.a. Distant Lover", "My Last Chance" (7" Single Version), and "You're the Man" (Alternate Version 1).

== Background and release ==
You're the Man was intended as another socially conscious record like What's Going On (1971), but following the release of its lead single, the title track "You're the Man", Gaye cancelled its release. This was in part due to the reception of the song, as well as the fact that Gaye's political views were different from those of Motown founder Berry Gordy. For these reasons, You're the Man was long considered a "lost" album.

Fifteen of the songs were not released on vinyl in the 1970s, but most were made available on CD compilations over the years. A longer take of "I Want to Come Home for Christmas" was first made available in 1990 after being recorded in 1972. The album includes liner notes written by David Ritz.

== Critical reception ==
Professional ratings
Review scores
Source	Rating
AllMusic	3/5 stars
Financial Times	4/5 stars
The Guardian	3/5 stars
The Independent	4/5 stars
NME	5/5 stars
Pitchfork	7.8/10
Record Collector	5/5 stars

You're the Man received positive reviews from critics noted at review aggregator Metacritic. It has a weighted average score of 74 out of 100, based on eight reviews. With 11 critics, Album of the Year considered the critical consensus a 75 out of 100 and AnyDecentMusic? summed up 12 reviews as a 7.5 out of 10.

== Track listing ==
No.	Title	Writer(s)	Length
1.	"You're the Man"	Marvin Gaye, Kenneth Stover	5:46
2.	"The World Is Rated X" (alternate mix)	Ezra Bolton, Marilyn McLeod, Mel Bolton, and Robert Gordy	3:52
3.	"Piece of Clay"	Gloria Jones, Pamela Sawyer	5:11
4.	"Where Are We Going?" (alternate mix 2)	Larry Mizell, Larry Gordon	3:51
5.	"I'm Gonna Give You Respect"	Willie Hutch	2:56
6.	"Try It, You'll Like It"	Hutch, Kathy Wakefield	3:57
7.	"You Are That Special One"	Hutch	3:38
8.	"We Can Make It Baby"	Hutch	3:24
9.	"My Last Chance" (Salaam Remi LP mix)	Gaye	3:40
10.	"Symphony" (Salaam Remi LP mix)	Gaye, Smokey Robinson	2:53
11.	"I'd Give My Life for You" (Salaam Remi LP mix)	Gaye	3:31
12.	"Woman of the World"	Mizell, Gordon	3:30
13.	"Christmas in the City"	Gaye	3:48
14.	"You're the Man" (Alternate Version 2)	Gaye, Stover	4:41
15.	"I Want to Come Home for Christmas"	Gaye, Forest Hairston	4:46
16.	"I'm Going Home"	Gaye	4:42
17.	"Checking Out (Double Clutch)"	Gaye	4:53
Total length:			1:08:59

== Charts ==
Chart (2019)	Peak position
Belgian Albums (Ultratop Flanders)	57
Belgian Albums (Ultratop Wallonia)	77
German Albums (Offizielle Top 100)	46
Scottish Albums (OCC)	30
Swiss Albums (Schweizer Hitparade)	80
UK Albums (OCC)	52
US Billboard 200	168
