= Soldier's Plea =

Single by Marvin Gaye

from the album That Stubborn Kinda Fellow
- Released: May 8, 1962
- Recorded: Hitsville USA, Detroit, Michigan; April 23, 1962
- Genre: Doo-wop, pop
- Label: Tamla; 54063
- Songwriter(s): William Stevenson; George Gordy; Andre Williams
- Producer(s): William Stevenson

Marvin Gaye singles chronology
"Sandman" (1962)	"Soldier's Plea" (1962)	"Stubborn Kind of Fellow" (1962)

"Soldier's Plea" is a 1962 single released by singer Marvin Gaye as Tamla 54063, and was the last non-charted early single Marvin released prior to releasing his first hit single, "Stubborn Kind of Fellow", later that year.

== Background ==
=== Recording ===
Recorded in the spring of 1962 a few days after Marvin turned 23, the song was the first single from Marvin's second album, That Stubborn Kinda Fellow. The song was the answer song to The Supremes' modest charter, "Your Heart Belongs to Me", as in that song, the lead singer Diana Ross wrote to her lover who was "serving his country from a faraway land". In Marvin's response, he counter-pleads his lover's stance that her heart belongs to him by having her keep that promise when he returned. The song was recorded with The Love Tones singing in the background.

=== Release ===
After "Let Your Conscience Be Your Guide" and "Sandman", this was the third single for Marvin not to chart on any Billboard chart. All three releases predated the grittier rock 'n' roll-styled dance hits that initially brought Marvin national fame in the early sixties and showed the young singer singing in a smooth tenor that predated his mid-1960s recordings as he became an established R&B star.

== Credits ==
- Lead vocals by Marvin Gaye
- Background vocals by The Love Tones (Carl Jones, William "Mickey" Stevenson, Joe Miles, and Stan Bracely)
- Instrumentation by The Funk Brothers
