= You're the Man (song) =

1972 song by Marvin Gaye

Single by Marvin Gaye

from the album You're the Man
- Released: April 26, 1972
- Recorded: March–April 1972
- Studio: Studio B and Hitsville U.S.A., Detroit
- Length: 5:48
- Label: Tamla
- Songwriters: Marvin Gaye; Kenneth Stover
- Producer: Marvin Gaye

Marvin Gaye singles chronology
"Save the Children" (1971)	"You're the Man" (1972)	"Trouble Man" (1972)

"You're the Man" is a song by the American singer-songwriter Marvin Gaye, composed by Gaye and Kenneth Stover. Released on the Motown subsidiary Tamla on April 26, 1972, the song commented on the 1972 presidential election. The song was supposedly the first release from Gaye's next album, You're the Man, but its modest success forced Gaye to shelve the album in protest.

== History ==
=== Recording ===
In 1972, Gaye's success with the socially conscious album What's Going On helped in pressuring Motown to give the musician more creative autonomous control of his music, leading to a $1 million deal being offered by Motown. Gaye responded by putting himself constantly in the studio working on a multitude of projects. One of the projects was another album focusing on social matters and further into politics, which was only hinted at in What's Going On.

Gaye and his band, which consisted of members of Hamilton Bohannon's group, went into the studio in the spring of 1972 to record a song inspired by the political election of the year. Gaye, who was being hounded by the federal government of the United States for failure to pay back taxes, felt that the government wasn't looking out for people's best interests and upon the election, also felt that no politician would help to ease any difficulty concerning US citizens.

=== Composition ===
"You're the Man" is a demand song in which Gaye calls out to potential candidates for president of the United States, particularly George McGovern, asking them if they really have a plan to "right all the wrongs" of the past administration and bring about change. In the same breath, however, Gaye berates the political system with the line, "politics and hypocrites is turning us all into lunatics".

Gaye then mockingly chants "you're the man" to the candidates. Throughout his career, he often expressed skepticism toward political authority, and his music repeatedly critiqued institutional power.

The song is an example of funk music, a genre which Gaye started to flirt with on What's Going On, particularly with the song, "Inner City Blues (Make Me Wanna Holler)", which features common stylistic elements with "You're the Man".

Like in "Inner City Blues", Gaye performs with multi-tracked vocals, with his falsetto providing the lead while his tenor provides the background vocals in three distinct ranges. One version of this song, later issued on the deluxe edition issue of Let's Get It On, has Gaye singing in tenor as the lead, and adding lyrics offering up an opinion that "maybe we should have a lady president", likely a reaction to the news of Shirley Chisholm running for president that year. In the final minutes of the song, Gaye not only implores the subject candidate to fight for peace but also for the decriminalization of marijuana, asking "what about marijuana" before saying "what about peace/peace in the land?"

=== Release ===
Gaye would say later that his view on politics ran against the views of Motown CEO Berry Gordy and that they would have "semi-violent disagreements". Gordy's response to "You're the Man" was to not promote the song, fearing a backlash against a portion of Motown's conservative fan base. Gaye in turn felt that Motown hadn't totally gotten behind the record, and as a result, shelved the rest of the album, which included compositions such as "Woman of the World", "Where Are We Going", "Piece of Clay" and "The World Is Rated X".

The reaction from R&B audiences was more swift than pop audiences, reaching the top ten on the former, eventually peaking at #7 while pop audiences that received the record, pushed it up to #50 before it dropped, probably due to demand from Motown's Quality Control to drop the song from its playlist, fearing backlash. Gaye would work on more unfinished projects throughout 1972 before releasing the Trouble Man soundtrack and the following year, focused on sexuality with Let's Get It On abandoning his earlier social messages.

Cash Box said of the song "Marvin, a proven force in the soul renaissance, shows how and why once again."

Rap act Digable Planets recorded the tribute song, "Marvin, You're the Man", based on this song, for the 1994 tribute album, Inner City Blues: The Music of Marvin Gaye.

=== Versions ===
In the years since his death, Motown has issued "You're the Man" on several compilations. For decades, the original monophonic single and the 1974 Marvin Gaye Anthology were the only available versions. Some compilations, such as 1995's The Best of Marvin Gaye and 2001's The Very Best of Marvin Gaye include a version of this, sourced from the original 45 but with the two parts edited back together to create a single 5:47 track.

The 2001 Deluxe Edition of Let's Get It On included two further contemporaneous versions. The so-called Alternate Version 1 (7:24) is a radically remixed version of the same take as the single version, with many different instrumental and vocal overdubs and lasting about a minute and a half longer. The so-called Alternate Version 2 (4:44) is a different take with quite different instrumentation and arrangement, and somewhat different lyrics.

The full album was released by Motown on March 29, 2019.

== Chart performance ==
Chart (1972)	Peak position
U.S. Billboard Hot 100	50
U.S. Hot Selling Soul Singles	7
