= Pretty Little Baby (Marvin Gaye song) =

Single by Marvin Gaye

from the album Anthology
- B-side: "Now That You've Won Me"
- Released: June 18, 1965
- Recorded: November 5, 7, & 17 and December 22, 1964
- Studio: Hitsville USA; Detroit, Michigan
- Genre: Soul, pop
- Length: 2:37
- Label: Tamla; T 54117
- Songwriters: Marvin Gaye; David Hamilton; Clarence Paul
- Producer: Clarence Paul

Marvin Gaye singles chronology
"I'll Be Doggone" (1965)	"Pretty Little Baby" (1965)	"Ain't That Peculiar" (1965)

"Pretty Little Baby" is a 1965 single released by soul singer Marvin Gaye on the Tamla label.

Co-written by Gaye, Clarence Paul and David Hamilton and produced by Paul, the song described the narrator's longing and pleading to his woman to not leave his side after the two had an argument.

The song was originally written and recorded as a psychedelic holiday song called "Purple Snowflakes". This version was eventually shelved and would not be released until 1993, when it was released on the Motown Christmas compilation Christmas in the City.

The song was Marvin's second top 40 single of 1965 after the success of his first number-one R&B Billboard hit, "I'll Be Doggone".

A non-album track until the release of his Anthology album nearly ten years later, this song was a top forty success for Gaye peaking at number sixteen on the R&B chart and number twenty-five pop. Cash Box described it as "a lyrical, chorus-backed funky romancer soulfully rendered by the songster."

== Charts ==
Chart (1965)	Peak position
US Billboard Hot 100	25
US Hot R&B/Hip-Hop Songs (Billboard)	16

== Personnel ==
- Lead vocals by Marvin Gaye
- Background vocals by the Andantes
- Instrumentation by the Funk Brothers
