= That Stubborn Kinda Fellow =

Studio album by Marvin Gaye
- Released: January 31, 1963
- Recorded: April–September 1962
- Studio: Hitsville USA, Detroit
- Genre: R&B; soul
- Length: 25:06
- Label: Tamla
- Producer: William "Mickey" Stevenson

Marvin Gaye chronology
The Soulful Moods of Marvin Gaye (1961)	That Stubborn Kinda Fellow (1963)	Marvin Gaye Recorded Live on Stage (1963)

Singles from That Stubborn Kinda Fellow
- 1. "Soldier's Plea" Released: May 8, 1962; 2. "Stubborn Kind of Fellow" Released: July 23, 1962; 3. "Hitch Hike" Released: December 19, 1962; 4. "Pride and Joy" Released: April 18, 1963

That Stubborn Kinda Fellow is the second studio album by Marvin Gaye, released on the Tamla label in 1963. The second LP Gaye released on the label, it also produced his first batch of successful singles for the label and established Gaye as one of the label's first hit-making acts in its early years.

== Background ==
Following the release of Gaye's first album, The Soulful Moods of Marvin Gaye, Gaye and Motown were in a struggle to agree with the direction his career should take. Despite the failure of Gaye's debut, which featured jazz and blues songs with only a few R&B songs, Gaye had no desire to have an R&B career, figuring he wouldn't get much exposure from a crossover audience singing R&B. Motown CEO Berry Gordy also had difficulty on how to present the music to the buying public. Though artists like The Miracles and Mary Wells had R&B success, they hardly were noticed by pop audiences. And while Motown's first signing act, Marv Johnson, was one of the label's earliest hitmakers, most of his music was released to United Artists, while Motown Recordings and its imprints Tamla, Motown and Gordy, had still not produced much success. Early releases by The Temptations and The Supremes also failed to gain national attention.

Finally, however, after the release of The Marvelettes' "Please Mr. Postman", which had a younger R&B sound that also attracted pop audiences and became Motown's first number-one pop single, Gordy decided to have its artists produce a much younger R&B sound. Though Marvin Gaye initially didn't want to go along with it, after seeing the success the Marvelettes had had with a song he co-wrote for them, "Beechwood 4-5789" and the emerging pop success of Mary Wells, Gaye changed his mind and began composing songs with collaborator Mickey Stevenson, determined to get footing in the still-fledgling label.

== Recording and composition ==
Like most Motown albums of the sixties, this album was produced quickly. Gaye wrote or co-wrote the majority of the songs on the album, often with Stevenson but also including other songwriters such as George Gordy, Barrett Strong, and Norman Whitfield, who had spent the early years of his career in Motown as a member of the label's Quality Control Department team.

For the majority of the songs, Gaye enlisted the background vocal helping of a young group named the Del-Phis. Its members were Gloria Williams, Rosalind Ashford, Annette Beard and Martha Reeves. Gordy later changed their name to the Vandellas after the group had been told to change their name before he signed them. Reeves later recalled that upon first meeting Gaye of how shy he was, wearing a hat, glasses and a cigar but had a crush on him as he took the hat and glasses off and began singing. In reaction to how handsome they perceive Gaye, the Vandellas began adding cooing-type background vocals.

The Vandellas would be joined in the background list of singers with the Love Tones (who did backing vocals for other Motown artists, most notably Mary Wells), the Rayber Voices, and the Andantes and struggling Motown groups the Temptations and the Supremes while the music was mainly handled by the label's in-house background band, later known as the Funk Brothers. Gaye himself added instrumentation, performing drums on a few songs and piano in others. The songs on That Stubborn Kinda Fellow incorporated elements of R&B, blues and doo-wop music, while also incorporating a then-nascent subgenre of R&B titled soul music, which Gaye would become one of the genre's major contributors and popularizers.

== Release ==
The album was issued in December 1962 on the Tamla subsidiary of Motown. While the album itself didn't chart (the R&B album chart wouldn't be created until 1965), several of the songs released off the album did chart. The first single was actually the Stevenson composition "Soldier's Plea", which had been issued initially as a non-album single and didn't chart but was included on the album as a filler track. The second single, "Stubborn Kind of Fellow", was the first charted single for Gaye, reaching #8 R&B and peaking at #46 pop in late 1962. The two other singles released from the album, "Hitch Hike" and "Pride and Joy", would fare even better on the pop charts, with "Hitch Hike" reaching #30 and a single version of "Pride and Joy" reaching #10, becoming his first top ten pop single and was also his first R&B single to reach the top five, peaking at #2 on the chart, nearly selling a million copies. With this album and its singles, Gaye was firmly now part of Motown's growing hit elite.

While not released as singles, the songs "Got to Get My Hands on Some Lovin'" and "Wherever I Lay My Hat (That's My Home)" became popular in the UK Northern Soul scene of the sixties as did the released singles. The songs on the album also became extremely popular with the UK's Mod scene of that same time period, and some of the songs would be covered by British R&B and beat groups such as The Rolling Stones and The Who (in an early incarnation). Back in the United States, pop producers were also impressed by the sound of the album, including Phil Spector, who was so amazed by the sound of "Stubborn Kind of Fellow" that in his excitement, he nearly collided with another car as he was driving. Eventually Paul Young would cover "Wherever I Lay My Hat" in the UK, where the song became a number-one hit in 1983.

== Track listing ==
No.	Title	Writer(s)	Length
1.	"Stubborn Kind of Fellow"	Marvin Gaye, William "Mickey" Stevenson, George Gordy	2:43
2.	"Pride and Joy"	Gaye, Stevenson, Norman Whitfield	2:35
3.	"Hitch Hike"	Gaye, Stevenson, Clarence Paul	2:30
4.	"Get My Hands on Some Lovin'"	Gaye, Stevenson	2:25
5.	"Wherever I Lay My Hat (That's My Home)"	Gaye, Whitfield, Barrett Strong	2:23
6.	"Soldier's Plea"	Stevenson, Gordy, Williams	2:44
7.	"It Hurt Me Too"	Gaye, Stevenson, Ricardo Wallace	2:43
8.	"Taking My Time"	Stevenson, Gordy	2:27
9.	"Hello There Angel"	Stevenson, Gordy	2:44
10.	"I'm Yours, You're Mine"	Stevenson, Anna Gordy Gaye	1:55
Total length:			25:06

== Personnel ==
- Marvin Gaye – lead vocals, piano, drums
- Martha and the Vandellas – backing vocals (all of side 1 and "It Hurt Me, Too")
- The Love Tones – backing vocals (on "Soldier's Plea", "Hello There Angel", and "I'm Yours, You're Mine")
- The Andantes – backing vocals (on "Taking My Time")
- The Funk Brothers – instrumentation
- Produced by William "Mickey" Stevenson
