= Save the Children (song) =

Single by Marvin Gaye

from the album What's Going On
- B-side: "Little Darling I Need You"; "Seek and You Shall Find"
- Released: November 11, 1971
- Recorded: August–October 1970
- Studio: Hitsville USA (Studio A); Golden World (Studio B); Hitsville West
- Genre: Soul
- Length: 4:03
- Label: Tamla
- Songwriters: Al Cleveland; Renaldo Benson; Marvin Gaye
- Producer: Marvin Gaye

Marvin Gaye singles chronology
"Inner City Blues (Make Me Wanna Holler)" (1971)	"Save the Children" (1971)	"You're the Man" (1972)

"Save the Children" is a song written by Al Cleveland, Renaldo Benson and Marvin Gaye and issued on Marvin's 1971 album, What's Going On. While not issued as a single in the United States, the song was issued as a single by the Tamla-Motown label in the United Kingdom where it peaked at No. 41 on the charts in December 1971, whereas the other major US single releases initially failed to chart in Europe.

The song would later be covered by Diana Ross in a medley featuring the jazz song, "Brown Baby", on her 1973 album, Touch Me in the Morning. Gaye sang this song briefly while touring Europe in 1976 as part of his What's Going On medley.

== Lyrics ==
The song was a continuation of the message "What's Going On" delivered, about love, this time, for the children. Marvin later joked on the liner notes of the album "not let (this song) influence anyone". Marvin recorded both a spoken word recitation of the song and a vocal version mixing the two vocals together featuring Marvin's soft-spoken vocals on one side and his expressive tenor on the other.

== Personnel ==
- Marvin Gaye – lead vocals, spoken verses, production
- The Andantes – background vocals
- The Funk Brothers – instrumentation
