= What's Going On (album) =

1971 album by Marvin Gaye

Studio album by Marvin Gaye
- Released: May 21, 1971
- Recorded: March 17–30 and May 5, 1971; (title track recorded June 1 – September 21, 1970)
- Studios: Hitsville U.S.A., Golden World and United Sound (Detroit); The Sound Factory (Los Angeles)
- Genres: Soul; progressive soul; psychedelic soul; R&B
- Length: 35:32
- Label: Tamla
- Producer: Marvin Gaye

Marvin Gaye chronology
Super Hits (1970)	What's Going On (1971)	Trouble Man (1972)

Singles from What's Going On
- 1. "What's Going On" Released: January 20, 1971; 2. "Mercy Mercy Me (The Ecology)" Released: June 10, 1971; 3. "Inner City Blues (Make Me Wanna Holler)" Released: September 16, 1971; 4. "Save the Children" Released: November 11, 1971

What's Going On is the eleventh studio album by the American soul singer Marvin Gaye. It was released on May 21, 1971, by the Motown Records subsidiary label Tamla. Recorded between 1970 and 1971 in sessions at Hitsville U.S.A., Golden World, United Sound Studios in Detroit, and at The Sound Factory in West Hollywood, California, it was Gaye's first album to credit him as producer and to credit Motown's in-house session musicians, known as the Funk Brothers.

What's Going On is a concept album with most of its songs segueing into the next and has been categorized as a song cycle. The narrative established by the songs is told from the point of view of a Vietnam veteran returning to his home country to witness hatred, suffering, and injustice. Gaye's introspective lyrics explore themes of drug abuse, poverty, and the Vietnam War. He has also been credited with promoting awareness of ecological issues before the public outcry over them had become prominent ("Mercy Mercy Me").

What's Going On stayed on the Billboard Top LPs for over a year and became Gaye's second number-one album on Billboard's Soul LPs chart, where it stayed for nine weeks, and on the No. 2 spot for another 12 weeks, respectively. The title track, which had been released in January 1971 as the album's lead single, hit number two on the Billboard Hot 100 and held the top position on Billboard's Soul Singles chart five weeks running. The follow-up singles "Mercy Mercy Me (The Ecology)" and "Inner City Blues (Make Me Wanna Holler)" also reached the top 10 of the Hot 100, making Gaye the first male solo artist to place three top ten singles on the Hot 100 from one album.

The album was an immediate commercial and critical success, and came to be viewed by music historians as a classic of 1970s soul and significant to the development of progressive soul. Multiple critics, musicians, and many in the general public consider What's Going On to be one of the greatest albums of all time and a landmark recording in popular music. In 1985, writers on British music weekly the NME voted it the best album of all time. In 2020 and 2023 revisions, Rolling Stone listed What's Going On as the greatest album of all time.

== Background ==
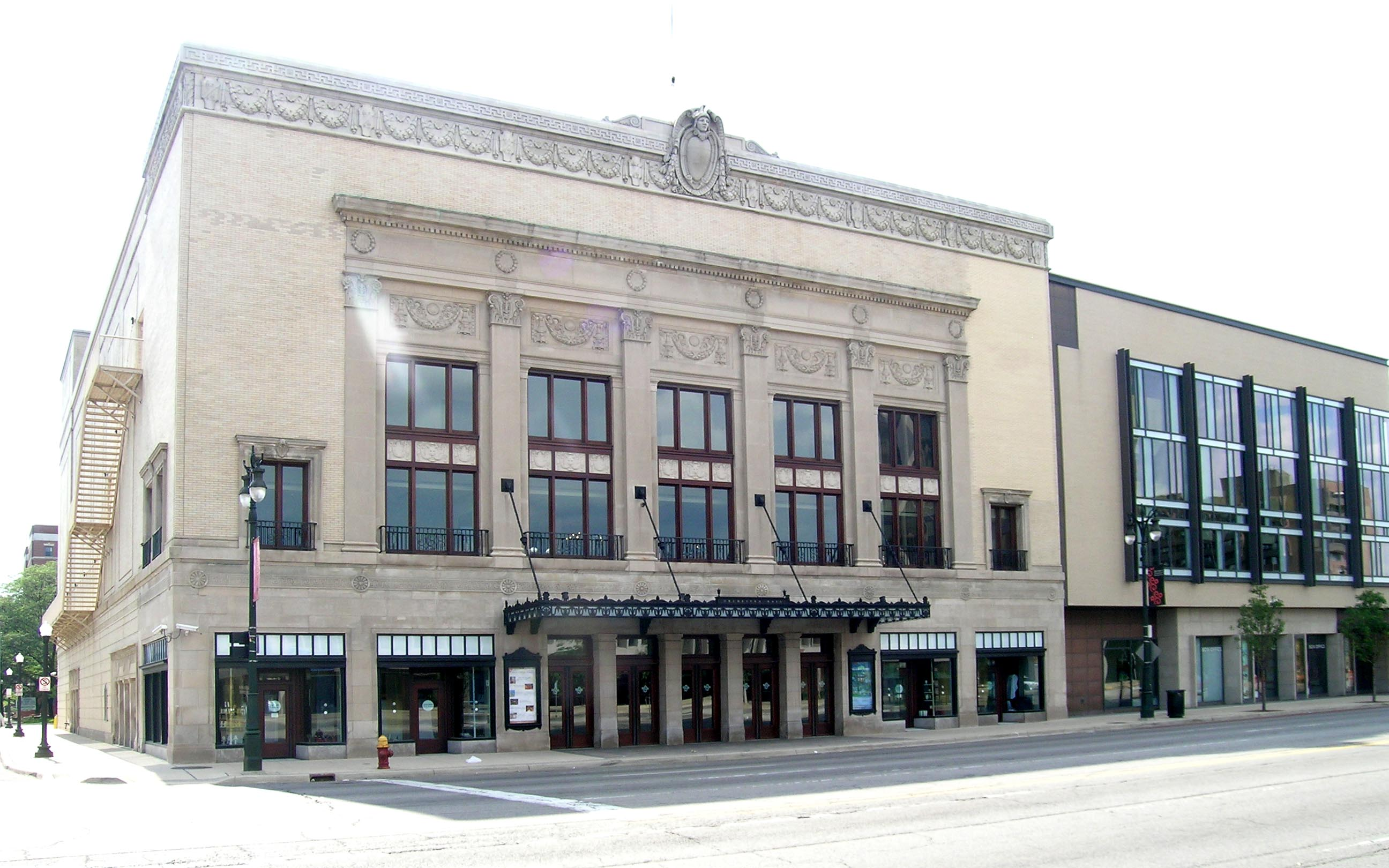
Gaye experienced personal and professional turmoil in the late 1960s and part of his refocusing on music was attending concerts from the Detroit Symphony Orchestra at Orchestra Hall at the Max M. Fisher Music Center (pictured 2008).

By the end of the 1960s, Marvin Gaye had fallen into a deep depression following the brain tumor diagnosis of his Motown singing partner Tammi Terrell, the failure of his marriage to Anna Gordy, a growing dependency on cocaine, troubles with the IRS, and struggles with Motown Records, the label he had signed with in 1960. One night, while holed up at a Detroit apartment, Gaye attempted suicide with a handgun, only to be stopped by Berry Gordy's father.

Gaye started to experience more international success around this time as both a solo artist with hits such as "I Heard It Through the Grapevine" and "Too Busy Thinking About My Baby" and as a dual artist with Tammi Terrell, but Gaye said during this time that he felt he "didn't deserve" his success and he felt like "a puppet - Berry's puppet, Anna's puppet. I had a mind of my own and I wasn't using it." In March 1970, Gaye's singing partner Terrell died of a brain tumor. The singer responded to Terrell's death by refusing to perform onstage for several years. In January 1970, Motown released Gaye's next studio album, That's the Way Love Is, but Gaye refused to promote the recording, choosing to stay at home. During this secluded period, Gaye ditched his previous clean-cut image to grow a beard, and preferred to wear sweatsuits instead of dress suits and sweaters.

The singer also got back in touch with his spirituality and also attended several concerts held by the Detroit Symphony Orchestra, which had been used for several Motown recordings in the 1960s. Around the spring of 1970, Gaye also began seriously pursuing a career in football with the professional football team the Detroit Lions of the NFL, even working out with the Eastern Michigan Eagles football team. However, his pursuit of a tryout was stopped after the owner of the team advised him that any future injury would derail his career. Gaye befriended three of the Lions teammates, Mel Farr, Charlie Sanders and Lem Barney, as well as then-Detroit Pistons star Dave Bing.

== Conception ==
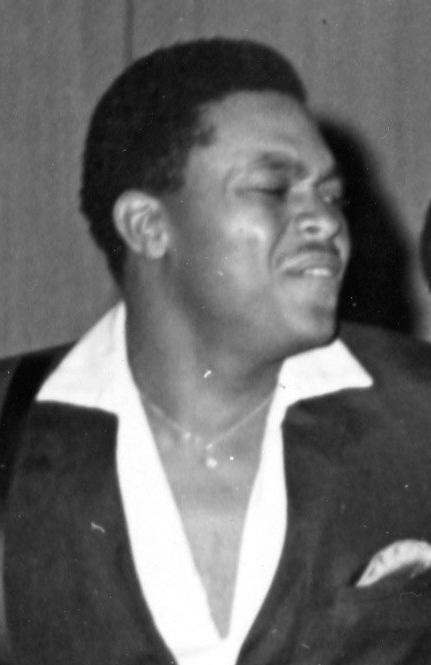
Fellow soul singer Renaldo Benson (pictured c. 1967) inspired Gaye to write about political themes and social change in his music.

While traveling on his tour bus with the Four Tops on May 15, 1969, Four Tops member Renaldo "Obie" Benson witnessed an act of police brutality and violence committed on anti-war protesters who had been protesting at Berkeley's People's Park in what was later termed as "Bloody Thursday". Benson later told author Ben Edmonds, "I saw this and started wondering 'what was going on, what is happening here?' One question led to another. Why are they sending kids far away from their families overseas? Why are they attacking their own kids in the street?" Returning to Detroit, Motown songwriter Al Cleveland wrote and composed a song based on his conversations with Benson of what he had seen in Berkeley. Benson sent the song to the Four Tops but his bandmates turned the song down. Benson said, "My partners told me it was a protest song. I said 'no man, it's a love song, about love and understanding. I'm not protesting. I want to know what's going on.'"

Benson offered the song to Marvin Gaye when he participated in a golf game with the singer. Returning to Gaye's home outside Outer Drive, Benson played the song to Gaye on his guitar. Gaye felt the song's moody flow would be perfect for the Originals. Benson eventually convinced Gaye that it was his song. The singer responded by asking for partial writing credit, which Benson allowed. Gaye added new musical composition, a new melody and lyrics that reflected Gaye's own disgust. Benson said later that Gaye tweaked and enriched the song, "added some things that were more ghetto, more natural, which made it seem like a story and not a song ... we measured him for the suit and he tailored the hell out of it." During this time, Gaye had been deeply affected by letters shared between him and his brother after he had returned from service in the Vietnam War over the treatment of Vietnam veterans.

Gaye had also been deeply affected by the social ills plaguing the United States at the time, and covered the track "Abraham, Martin & John", in 1969, which became a UK hit for him in 1970. Gaye cited the 1965 Watts riots as a pivotal moment in his life in which he asked himself, "with the world exploding around me, how am I supposed to keep singing love songs?" One night, he called Berry Gordy about doing a protest record, to which Gordy chastised him, "Marvin, don't be ridiculous. That's taking things too far." The singer's brother Frankie wrote in his 2003 autobiography, My Brother Marvin, that while reuniting at their parents' home in Washington, D.C., Frankie's recalling of his tenure at the war made both brothers cry. At one point, Marvin sat propped up in a bed with his hands in his face. Afterwards, Gaye told his brother: "I didn't know how to fight before, but now I think I do. I just have to do it my way. I'm not a painter. I'm not a poet. But I can do it with music."

In an interview with Rolling Stone, Marvin Gaye discussed what had shaped his view on more socially conscious themes in music and the conception of his eleventh studio album:

In 1969 or 1970, I began to re-evaluate my whole concept of what I wanted my music to say ... I was very much affected by letters my brother was sending me from Vietnam, as well as the social situation here at home. I realized that I had to put my own fantasies behind me if I wanted to write songs that would reach the souls of people. I wanted them to take a look at what was happening in the world.

== Recording ==
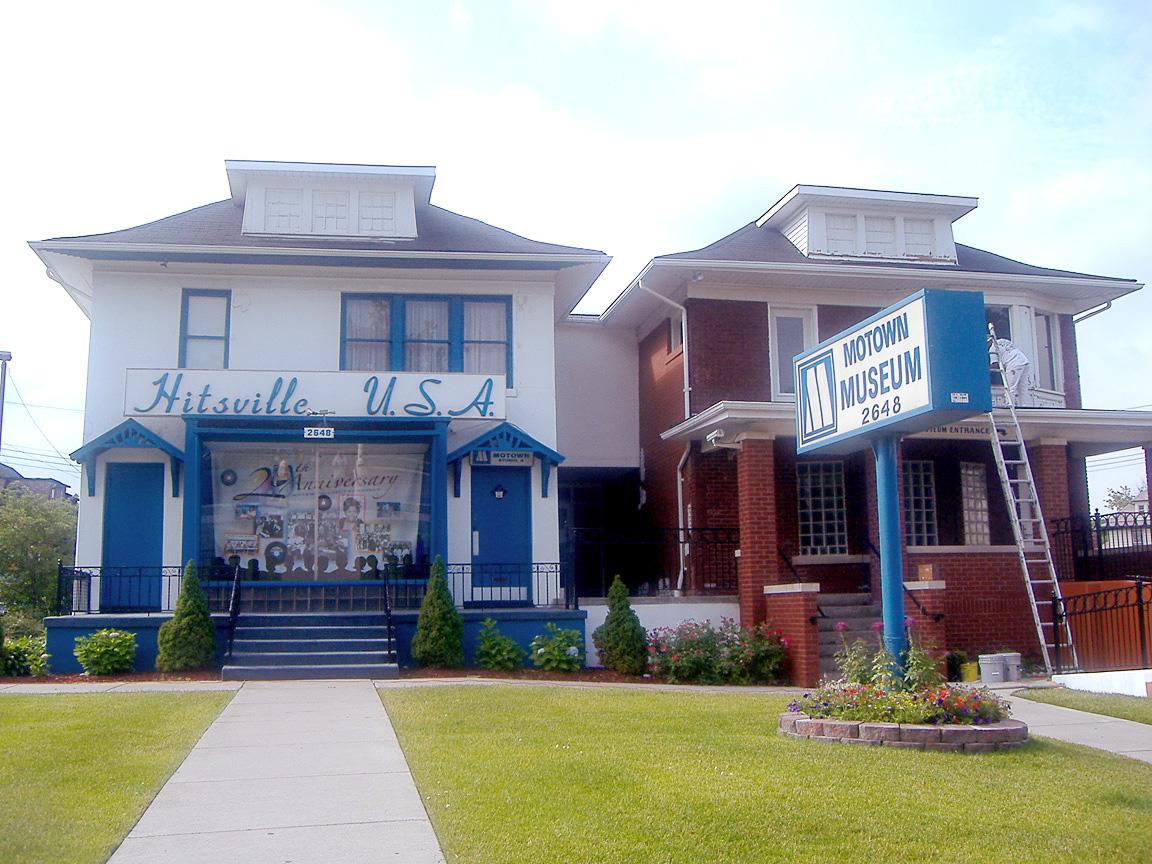
Gaye recorded the album in Detroit at Motown's in-house studio, Hitsville U.S.A. (since converted into a museum, pictured 2006).

On June 1, 1970, Gaye entered Motown's Hitsville U.S.A. studios to record "What's Going On". Immediately after learning about the song, many of Motown's musicians, known as The Funk Brothers noted that there was a different approach with Gaye's record from that used on other Motown recordings, and Gaye complicated matters by bringing in only a few of the members while bringing his own recruits, including drummer Chet Forest. Longtime Funk Brothers members Jack Ashford, James Jamerson and Eddie Brown participated in the recording. Jamerson was pulled into the recording studio by Gaye after he located Jamerson playing with a local band at a blues bar and Eli Fontaine, the saxophonist behind "Baby, I'm For Real", also participated in the recording. Jamerson, who could not sit properly on his seat after arriving to the session drunk, performed his bass riffs, written for him by the album's arranger David Van De Pitte, on the floor. Fontaine's alto saxophone riff to open the song was not originally intended. When Gaye heard the playback of what Fontaine thought was simply a demo, Gaye instantly decided that the riff was the ideal way to start the song. When Fontaine said he was "just goofing around", Gaye being pleased with the results replied, "Well, you goof off exquisitely. Thank you."

The laid-back sessions of the single were credited to lots of "marijuana smoke and rounds of Scotch". Gaye's trademark multi-layering vocal approach came off initially as an accident by engineers Steve Smith and Kenneth Sands. Sands later explained that Gaye had wanted him to bring him the two lead vocal takes for "What's Going On" for advice on which one he should use for the final song. Smith and Sands accidentally mixed the two lead vocal takes together. Gaye loved the sound and decided to keep it and use it for the duration of the album.

That September, Gaye approached Gordy with the "What's Going On" song while in California where Gordy had relocated. According to one account, Gordy disliked the song, allegedly calling it "the worst thing I ever heard in my life". As a result, Gaye angrily responded to Gordy's alleged putdown by going on strike until Gordy changed his mind. Gordy himself denied this claim, stating he loved the song's jazzy feel but cautioned Gaye that the sound was out of date of the sound of the times and also feared the loss of Gaye's crossover audience by releasing the political song. Gaye continued to record his own compositions during this time, some of which later made his 1973 album, Let's Get It On. Motown executive Harry Balk recalled trying to get Gordy to release the song at the end of the year, to which Gordy replied to him, "that Dizzy Gillespie stuff in the middle, that scatting, it's old." Gordy mentioned later that he feared no one would buy songs with a jazz influence after his attempt to be a record store owner of a jazz shop folded after a year, years prior to starting Motown. Most of Motown's Quality Control Department team also turned the song down, with Balk later stating that "they were used to the 'baby baby' stuff, and this was a little hard for them to grasp."

With the help of Motown sales executive Barney Ales, Harry Balk got the song released to record stores on January 20, 1971, sending 100,000 copies of the song without Gordy's knowledge, with another 100,000 copies sent after that success. Upon its release, the song became a hit and was Motown's fastest-selling single at the time, peaking at number 1 on the Hot Soul Singles Chart, and peaking at number 2 on the Billboard Hot 100. Stunned by the news, Gordy drove to Gaye's home to discuss making a complete album, stating Gaye could do what he wanted with his music if he finished the record within 30 days before the end of March and thus effectively giving him the right to produce his own albums. Gaye returned to Hitsville to record the rest of What's Going On, which took a mere ten business days between March 17 and March 30. The album's rhythm tracks and sound overdubs were recorded at Hitsville, or Studio A, while the strings, horns, lead and background vocals were recorded at Golden World, or Studio B.

The album's original mix, recorded in Detroit at both Hitsville and Golden World as well as United Sound Studios, was finalized on April 5, 1971. When Gordy listened to the mix, he worried that no other hit single would emerge from it. To ease Gordy's worries, Gaye and the album's engineers entered The Sound Factory in West Hollywood in early May, integrating the orchestra somewhat closer with the rhythm tracks, while Gaye used different vocal tracks and added extra instrumentation. Presented to Motown's Quality Control department team, they were worried about future hit singles due to its concurrent style with each song leading to the next. Gordy however vetoed their decision, agreeing to put this mix of the album out that month.

== Packaging and cover art ==
The album's cover was photographed by Jim Hendin and designed by Motown art director Curtis McNair in Gaye's backyard, where a sudden bout of sleet added moisture to his trench coat and turned his hair white in the shots. McNair selected the photograph for these details, saying it added to the image's drama. His supervisor, Tom Schlesinger, initially rejected McNair's preferred low-angle shot, but Gaye himself was consulted and insisted on the photograph, settling the decision.

== Music and lyrics ==
"What's Going On"
The opening 30 seconds of the album's first track, which feature layered vocals, horns, and polyrhythm.

"What's Going On", the title track, features soulful, passionate vocals and multi-tracked background singing, both by Gaye. The song had strong jazz, gospel, classical music orchestration, and arrangements. Reviewer Eric Henderson of Slant stated the song had an "understandably mournful tone" in response to the fallout of the late 1960s counterculture movements. Henderson also wrote that "Gaye's choice to emphasize humanity at its most charitable rather than paint bleak pictures of destruction and disillusionment is characteristic of the album that follows."

This is immediately followed in segue flow by the second track, "What's Happening Brother", a song Gaye dedicated to his brother Frankie, in which Gaye wrote to explain the disillusionment of war veterans who returned to civilian life and their disconnect from pop culture. "Flyin' High (In the Friendly Sky)", which took its title from a United Airlines tag, "fly the friendly skies", dealt with dependence on heroin. The lyric, "I know, I'm hooked my friend, to the boy, who makes slaves out of men", references heroin as "boy", which was slang for the drug. "Save the Children" was an emotional plea to help disadvantaged children, warning, "who really cares/who's willing to try/to save a world/that is destined to die?", later crying out, "save the babies". A truncated version of "God Is Love" follows "Save the Children" and makes references to God.

"Mercy Mercy Me (The Ecology)" was another emotional plea, this time for the environment. Motown legend, musician and Funk Brothers leader Earl Van Dyke once mentioned that Berry Gordy didn't know of the word "ecology" and had to be told what it was, though Gordy claimed otherwise. The song featured a memorable tenor saxophone solo from Detroit music legend Wild Bill Moore. "Right On" was a seven-minute jam influenced by funk rock and Latin soul rhythms that focused on Gaye's own divided soul in which Gaye later pleaded in falsetto, "if you let me, I will take you to live where love is King" after complying that "true love can conquer hate every time". "Wholy Holy" follows "God Is Love" as an emotional gospel plea advising people to "come together" to "proclaim love [as our] salvation". The final track, "Inner City Blues (Make Me Wanna Holler)", focuses on urban poverty, backed by a minimalist, dark blues-oriented funk vibe, with its bass riffs composed and performed by Bob Babbitt, who also performed on "Mercy Mercy Me". The entire album's stylistic use of a song cycle gave it a cohesive feel and was one of R&B's first concept albums, described as "a groundbreaking experiment in collating a pseudo-classical suite of free-flowing songs."

David Hepworth described the album as "like a jazz record not merely because it had jazz manners and was slathered in strings and employed congas and triangle as its most prominent form of percussion...But it's also jazz in the sense that...[i]t plays like one long single." The Absolute Sound described the album as "a brilliant psychedelic soul song-cycle".

== Release and promotion ==
Released on May 21, 1971, What's Going On shipped gold upon its release and became Gaye's first Top 10 entry on the Billboard Top LPs, peaking at number six. It stayed on the chart over a year, selling some two million copies within twelve months. It was Motown's (and Gaye's) best-selling album to that date – until he released Let's Get It On in 1973. It also became Gaye's second number-one album on Billboard's Soul LPs chart, where it stayed for nine weeks, remaining on the Billboard Soul LPs chart for 58 weeks throughout 1971 and 1972. The title track, which had been released in January 1971 as the lead single to promote the album, sold more than 200,000 copies within its first week and 2.5 million by the end of the year. It hit number 1 in Record World, number 2 on the Billboard Hot 100 (behind Three Dog Night's "Joy to the World"), number 1 on the Cash Box Top 100, and held the pole position on Billboard's Soul Singles chart five weeks running.

The follow-up single, "Mercy Mercy Me (The Ecology)", peaked at number-four on the Hot 100, and also went number-one on the R&B chart. The third, and final, single, "Inner City Blues (Make Me Wanna Holler)", peaked at number-nine on the Hot 100, while also rising to number-one on the R&B chart, thus making Gaye the first male solo artist to place three top ten singles on the Hot 100 off one album, as well as the first artist to place three singles at number one on any Billboard chart (in this case, R&B), off one single album. The album had a modest commercial reception in countries such as Canada and the United Kingdom; "Save the Children" reached number 41 on the latter country's singles chart, while the album, 25 years after its original release, reached number 56. In 1984, the album re-entered the Billboard 200 following Gaye's untimely death. In 1994, the album was certified gold by the Recording Industry Association of America in the United States for sales of half a million copies after it was issued on CD. It was certified platinum by the British Phonographic Industry for shipments of 300,000 albums. This disc has sold over 1.7 million U. S. copies since SoundScan was activated in 1991.

Six months after the release of What's Going On, Sly and the Family Stone released There's a Riot Goin' On (1971), titled in response to Gaye's album.

== Critical reception ==
Professional ratings
Review scores
Source	Rating
AllMusic	5/5 stars
Chicago Tribune	4/4 stars
Christgau's Record Guide	B+
MusicHound R&B	5/5 stars
The Observer	5/5 stars
Rolling Stone	4/5 stars
The Rolling Stone Album Guide	5/5 stars
Slant Magazine	4/5 stars
Sputnikmusic	5/5
The Village Voice	B

What's Going On was generally well received by contemporary critics. Writing for Rolling Stone in 1971, Vince Aletti praised Gaye's thematic approach towards social and political concerns, while discussing the surprise of Motown releasing such an album. In a joint review of What's Going On and Stevie Wonder's Where I'm Coming From, Aletti wrote, "Ambitious, personal albums may be a glut on the market elsewhere, but at Motown they're something new ... the album as a whole takes precedence, absorbing its own flaws. There are very few performers who could carry a project like this off. I've always admired Marvin Gaye, but I didn't expect that he would be one of them. Guess I seriously underestimated him. It won't happen again." Billboard described the record as "a cross between Curtis Mayfield and that old Motown spell and outdoes anything Gaye's ever done". Time magazine hailed it as a "vast, melodically deft symphonic pop suite". The Village Voice critic Robert Christgau was less impressed. Writing in Christgau's Record Guide: Rock Albums of the Seventies (1981), he deemed it both a "groundbreaking personal statement" and a Berry Gordy product, baited by three highly original singles but marred elsewhere by indistinct music and indulgent use of David Van De Pitte's strings, which Christgau called "the lowest kind of movie-background dreck".

According to Paul Gambaccini, Gaye's death in 1984 prompted a critical re-evaluation of the album, and most reviewers have since regarded it as an important masterpiece of popular music. In MusicHound R&B (1998), Gary Graff said What's Going On was "not just a great Gaye album but is one of the great pop albums of all time", and Rolling Stone later credited the album for having "revolutionized black music". The Washington Post critic Geoffrey Himes names it an exemplary release of the progressive soul development from 1968 to 1973, and Pitchfork's Tom Breihan calls it a prog-soul masterpiece. BBC Music's David Katz described the album as "one of the greatest albums of all time, and nothing short of a masterpiece" and compared it to Miles Davis's Kind of Blue by saying "its non-standard musical arrangements, which heralded a new sound at the time, gives it a chilling edge that ultimately underscores its gravity, with subtle orchestral enhancements offset by percolating congas, expertly layered above James Jamerson's bubbling bass". In his 1994 review of Gaye's re-issues, Chicago Tribune reviewer Greg Kot described the album as "soul music's first 'art' album, an inner-city response to the Celtic mysticism of Van Morrison's Astral Weeks, the psychedelic pop of the Beatles' Sgt. Pepper's Lonely Hearts Club Band [and] the rewired blues of Bob Dylan's Highway 61 Revisited." Richie Unterberger found the album somewhat overrated, writing in The Rough Guide to Rock (2003) that much of its "meandering introspection" paled in comparison to its three singles.

A remastered deluxe edition with 28 additional tracks was released on May 31, 2011, to similar acclaim. At Metacritic, which assigns a normalized rating out of 100 to reviews from mainstream critics, the album received an average score of 100, based on ten reviews.

== Legacy and accolades ==
In 1985, writers on British music weekly the NME voted it the best album of all time. What's Going On was inducted into the Grammy Hall of Fame in 1998. The album's title track was ranked number four on Rolling Stone's list of the 500 Greatest Songs of All Time in the original 2004 ranking and the 2010 revision. The publication ranked the song number six on its updated 2021 list and its 2024 revision, and in 2025, it ranked the song at number 15 on its list of "The 100 Best Protest Songs of All Time."

A 1999 critics' poll conducted by British newspaper The Guardian named it the "Greatest Album of the 20th Century". In 1997, What's Going On was named the 17th greatest album of all time in a poll conducted in the United Kingdom by HMV, Channel 4, The Guardian and Classic FM. In 1997, The Guardian ranked the album number one on its list of the 100 Best Albums Ever. In 1998 Q magazine readers placed it at number 97, while in 2001 the TV network VH1 placed it at number 4. In 2003, it was one of 50 recordings chosen that year by the Library of Congress to be added to the National Recording Registry. What's Going On was ranked number 6 on Rolling Stone magazine's 2003 list of the 500 Greatest Albums of All Time, one of three Gaye albums to be included, succeeded by 1973's Let's Get It On (number 165) and 1978's Here, My Dear (number 462). The album is Gaye's highest-ranking entry on the list, as well as several other publications' lists. In a revised 2020 list, this time voted on by musicians instead of music critics, the album moved up to the top spot, replacing the Beatles' Sgt. Pepper's Lonely Hearts Club Band.

In June 2026, CBS News included the title track and album track "What's Happening, Brother?" in its list of the 250 essential American songs of the past 250 years, two of three Gaye songs to make the list.

Accolades for What's Going On
Publication	Country	Accolade	Year	Rank
Bill Shapiro	United States	The Top 100 Rock Compact Discs	1991	*
Jimmy Guteman	United States	The Best Rock 'n' Roll Records of All Time	1992	*
Chris Smith	United States	101 Albums That Changed Popular Music	2009	*
Elvis Costello (Vanity Fair, Issue No. 483)	United States	Costello's 500	2000	*
Chuck Eddy	United States	The Accidental Evolution of Rock'n'Roll	1997	*
Consequence of Sound	United States	Top 100 Albums Ever	2010	19
Consequence	United States	100 Greatest Albums of All Time	2022	9
Dave Marsh & Kevin Stein	United States	The 40 Best of Album Chartmakers by Year	1981	7
Paste	United States	300 Greatest Albums of all-time	2024	13
Pitchfork	United States	Top 100 Albums of the 1970s	2004	49
Rolling Stone	United States	The 500 Greatest Albums of All Time	2003	6
Rolling Stone	United States	The 500 Greatest Albums of All Time	2020	1
Spin	United States	15 Most Influential Albums Not By Beatles, Stones, Dylan or Elvis	2003	*
Time	United States	Top 100 Albums of All Time	2006	
NME	United Kingdom	All Times Top 100 Albums	1985	1
NME	United Kingdom	500 Greatest Albums of All Time	2013	25
Waxx Lyrical	Australia	Record Of The Month	2023	
(*) designates lists that are unordered.

== Track listing ==
Credits as shown in the 1971 original album liner notes release.

Side one
No.	Title	Writer(s)	Length
1.	"What's Going On"	Marvin Gaye; Al Cleveland; Renaldo "Obie" Benson	3:51
2.	"What's Happening Brother"	Gaye; James Nyx Jr.	2:57
3.	"Flyin' High (In the Friendly Sky)"	Gaye	3:40
4.	"Save the Children"	Gaye; Cleveland; Benson	4:03
5.	"God Is Love"	Gaye; Anna Gaye; Elgie Stover; Nyx	2:31
6.	"Mercy Mercy Me (The Ecology)"	Gaye	3:05
Total length:			19:08

Side two
No.	Title	Writer(s)	Length
1.	"Right On"	Gaye; Earl DeRouen	7:20
2.	"Wholy Holy"	Gaye; Benson; Cleveland	3:20
3.	"Inner City Blues (Make Me Wanna Holler)"	Gaye; Nyx	5:28
Total length:			15:56

2002 remaster bonus tracks
No.	Title	Writer(s)	Length
10.	"God Is Love"	Gaye; A. Gaye; Stover; Nyx	2:48
11.	"Sad Tomorrows"	Gaye; Fuller B. Gordy; Delores Wilkinson	2:22

== Personnel ==
- All lead vocals by Marvin Gaye
- Produced by Marvin Gaye
- Members of the Detroit Symphony Orchestra Conducted and Arranged by David Van De Pitte
- Backing vocals:
  - Marvin Gaye
  - The Andantes (Jackie Hicks, Marlene Barrow, and Louvain Demps)
  - Mel Farr, Charlie Sanders and Lem Barney of the Detroit Lions
  - Dave Bing of the Detroit Pistons
  - Bobby Rogers of The Miracles
  - Elgie Stover
  - Kenneth Stover
- Strings, woodwinds and brass
  - Gordon Staples, Zinovi Bistritzky, Beatriz Budinzky, Richard Margitza, Virginia Halfmann, Felix Resnick, Alvin Score, Lillian Downs, James Waring – violin
  - Edouard Kesner, Meyer Shapiro, David Ireland, Nathan Gordon – viola
  - Italo Babini, Thaddeus Markiewicz, Edward Korkigan – cello
  - Max Janowsky – double bass
  - Carole Crosby – harp
  - Dayna Hardwick, William Perich – flute
  - Larry Nozero, Angelo Carlisi, George Benson, Tate Houston – saxophone
  - John Trudell, Maurice Davis – trumpet
  - Nilesh Pawar – oboe
  - Carl Raetz – trombone
- The Funk Brothers – Instrumentation, spoken interlude ("What's Going On") and solo horns
  - Eli Fountain – alto saxophone "What's Going On"
  - Wild Bill Moore – tenor saxophone "Mercy Mercy Me"
  - Marvin Gaye – piano, Mellotron ("Mercy Mercy Me"), box drum ("What's Going On")
  - Johnny Griffith – celeste, additional keyboards
  - Earl Van Dyke – additional keyboards
  - Jack Brokensha – vibraphone, percussion
  - Joe Messina, Robert White – electric guitar
  - James Jamerson – bass guitar "What's Going On", "What's Happening Brother", "Flyin' High", "Save the Children", "God Is Love", and the b-side "Sad Tomorrows"
  - Bob Babbitt – bass guitar "Mercy Mercy Me", "Right On", "Wholy Holy" and "Inner City Blues"
  - Chet Forest – drums
  - Jack Ashford – tambourine, percussion
  - Eddie "Bongo" Brown – bongos, congas
  - Earl DeRouen – bongos and congas "Right On"
  - Bobbye Hall – bongos "Inner City Blues"
- Katherine Marking – graphic design
- Alana Coghlan – graphic design
- John Matousek – mastering
- Vic Anesini – Digital Remastering
- James Hendin – Photography
- Curtis McNair – Art Direction

== Charts ==
=== Weekly charts ===
1971 weekly chart performance for What's Going On
Chart (1971)	Peak position
Canadian RPM Albums Chart	37
US Billboard Pop Albums	6
US Billboard Top Soul Albums	1

1984 weekly chart performance for What's Going On
Chart (1984)	Peak position
US Billboard Pop Albums	154

1996 weekly chart performance for What's Going On
Chart (1996)	Peak position
UK Albums (OCC)	56

2006 weekly chart performance for What's Going On
Chart (2006)	Peak position
Irish Albums	64

2025 weekly chart performance for What's Going On
Chart (2025)	Peak position
Greek Albums (IFPI)	13

=== Year-end charts ===
1971 year-end chart performance for What's Going On
Chart (1971)	Position
US Billboard Pop Albums	52
US Billboard Top Soul Albums	3

1972 year-end chart performance for What's Going On
Chart (1972)	Position
US Billboard Top Soul Albums	27

== Certifications ==
Certifications for What's Going On
Region	Certification	Certified units/sales
United Kingdom (BPI)	Platinum	300,000^{*}
United States (RIAA)	Gold	500,000^{^}
^{*} Sales figures based on certification alone.^{^} Shipments figures based on certification alone.

== See also ==
- List of 1970s albums considered the best
- List of number-one R&B albums of 1971 (U.S.)
- What's Going On Live, a 2019 album
