= Trouble Man (song) =

Single by Marvin Gaye

from the album Trouble Man
- B-side: Don't Mess With Mister "T"
- Released: November 21, 1972
- Recorded: Hitsville West (Los Angeles, California)
- Genre: Soul, funk, blues, jazz
- Length: 3:49
- Label: Tamla
- Songwriter: Marvin Gaye
- Producer: Marvin Gaye

Marvin Gaye singles chronology
"You're the Man" (1972)	"Trouble Man" (1972)	"I Want to Come Home for Christmas" (1972)

"Trouble Man" is a song composed and written by American recording artist Marvin Gaye released on the Motown subsidiary, Tamla, in November 1972. The song became one of Gaye's signature songs for the remainder of his life and would later be the basis of a biography as a sort of nickname for him. The album version of the song was the only one released as a single in November 1972, where it became a top ten hit on the Billboard Hot 100 reaching number seven on that chart in January 1973.

== Background ==
The song is the title track and theme for the blaxploitation film of the same name. The song is about the travails of the movie's lead character, "Mister T", and also relates to issues in Gaye's private life. Gaye described the song as one of the most honest recordings he ever made. He played drums and piano on the record and performs all the vocals himself. Gaye sings most of the song in falsetto while reaching a gospel-styled growl during the bridges of the song.

The performances of the song during Gaye's later concerts became one of his highlights during his 1970s and early 1980s tours. The song was also used as two instrumental "theme songs" on the accompanying album, in which Gaye played synthesizers to accompany saxophone solos from his musicians. Gaye also recorded a slightly different version of the song primarily for the movie's opening, in which he sang in both tenor and falsetto.

== Reception ==
Cash Box described it as a "fine blend of smooth vocals and intriguing musical ventures."

== Chart performance ==
Chart (1972/73)	Peak position
US Billboard Hot 100	7
US Best Selling Soul Singles (Billboard)	4

== Popular culture ==
- The song was referenced in issue #13 (May 1994) of Milestone Media's Icon series, where a character opined that it was "way better than the movie it came from".
- It was featured on the soundtrack for the video game Driver: Parallel Lines.
- It was also featured on the soundtrack for the films: Four Brothers, Se7en, Captain America: The Winter Soldier, and Roman J. Israel, Esq. It was also featured in the third episode of season 4 of Mayor of Kingstown.
- The song is also referenced in The Falcon and the Winter Soldier.

== Samples ==
- T.I's album, Trouble Man: Heavy is the Head, is made after this song and on his first track, T.I samples Gaye's voice in the song.
