= Let's Get It On (song) =

1973 song by Marvin Gaye

Single by Marvin Gaye

from the album Let's Get It On
- B-side: "I Wish It Would Rain"
- Released: June 15, 1973
- Recorded: March 22, 1973
- Studio: Hitsville West, Los Angeles
- Genre: Soul; R&B; deep funk
- Length: 4:53 (album version); 3:58 (single edit)
- Label: Tamla
- Songwriters: Marvin Gaye; Ed Townsend
- Producers: Marvin Gaye; Ed Townsend

Marvin Gaye singles chronology
"I Want to Come Home for Christmas" (1972)	"Let's Get It On" (1973)	"You're a Special Part of Me" (1973)

Side label art
- 1973 UK single release

Audio sample
- file; help

"Let's Get It On" is a song by soul musician Marvin Gaye, released June 15, 1973, on Motown-subsidiary label Tamla Records. The song was recorded at Hitsville West in Los Angeles, California. The song features romantic and sexual lyricism and funk instrumentation by the Funk Brothers. The title track of Gaye's album of the same name, it was written by Marvin Gaye and producer Ed Townsend. "Let's Get It On" became Gaye's most successful single for Motown and one of his most well-known songs. With the help of the song's sexually explicit content, "Let's Get It On" helped give Gaye a reputation as a sex symbol during its initial popularity. "Let's Get It On" is written and composed in the key of E-flat major and is set in time signature of common time with a tempo of 82 beats per minute.

== Conception ==
Co-written with producer Ed Townsend, "Let's Get It On" was Gaye's plea for sexual liberation. When originally conceived by Townsend, who was released from a rehab facility for alcoholism, it was written with a religious theme. Gaye confidante Kenneth Stover changed some of the words around as a political song and Gaye recorded the version as it was written, but Townsend protested that the song was not a politically conscious song but a song dedicated to love and sex. Gaye and Townsend then collaborated on new lyrics and, using the original backing tracks as recorded, Gaye transformed the song into an emotional centerpiece. The album version of "Let's Get It On" features soulful and emotional singing by Gaye that is backed by multi-tracked background vocals, also provided by Gaye, along with the song's signature, and most notable, funky guitar arrangements. In an article for Rolling Stone magazine, music critic Jon Landau wrote of the song:

"Let's Get It On" is a classic Motown single, endlessly repeatable and always enjoyable. It begins with three great wah-wah notes that herald the arrival of a vintage Fifties melody. But while the song centers around classically simple chord changes, the arrangement centers around a slightly eccentric rhythm pattern that deepens the song's power while covering it with a contemporary veneer. Above all, it has Marvin Gaye's best singing at its center, fine background voices on the side, and a long, moody fade-out that challenges you not to play the cut again.

— Jon Landau

The song was reprised on the fourth track of Let's Get It On as "Keep Gettin' It On", which was a sequel and continuation of the original. The recording of the title track also inspired Gaye to revive previous recordings from his earlier 1970 sessions at the Hitsville U.S.A. Studio, which would consist of the rest of the album's material.

In 2001, when the album Let's Get It On was reissued by Motown as a two-disc deluxe edition release, the original demo that Gaye had recorded with lyrics by Kenneth Stover was included. It has a running time of 5:12.

During the time of the recording of the song and its subsequent album of the same name, Marvin had befriended the family of jazz guitarist Slim Gaillard and had become smitten with Gaillard's 17-year-old daughter, Janis Hunter. A widely reported story has been told that Hunter was in the studio when Gaye recorded the song at the recording booth. Gaye and Hunter were said to be smitten with each other and, within months, they began dating. Hunter would become Gaye's live-in lover by 1974. Their relationship would produce two children and a 1977 marriage.

== Release and reception ==
"Let's Get It On" became, and remains to this day, one of Gaye's as well Motown Records' most successful singles, as it reached number 1 on the Billboard Pop Singles chart on September 8, 1973. The single remained at number 1 for two weeks, while also remaining at the top of the Billboard Soul Singles chart for six weeks. In its first week at the top of the chart, "Let's Get It On" replaced "Brother Louie" by Stories, and was replaced by "Delta Dawn" by Helen Reddy; it later replaced "Delta Dawn" and was finally knocked off the top of the chart by Grand Funk Railroad's "We're an American Band". The single stayed inside the Billboard Hot 100 top 10 for 13 weeks, 10 of those weeks inside the top five. Billboard ranked it as the No. 4 song for 1973.

At the time, the single was Motown's largest-selling recording ever, selling over four-million copies in 1973 and 1974. The single has gone on to sell over 1 million copies in the United States, and was certified Platinum in sales by the RIAA.

Cash Box said that the song was different from Gaye's previous songs and a "very accomplished effort a la Otis Redding or Al Green." Record World called it a "lovely laid-back number" and said that "this tune gets it on."

A bluegrass version of the song was later recorded by Shannon Lawson on his 2002 album Chase the Sun. "Let's Get It On" was given a remix in 2004, when producers mixed Gaye's vocals with a different musical production labeled as "stepper's music". Released in 2005 as a single, "Let's Get It On (The Producers Mix)" returned the song to the Billboard R&B charts, thirty years after its original release. The re-released version of "Let's Get It On" was certified as a gold single with sales in excess of 500,000 copies in 2005 by the RIAA. In 2004, the song was ranked number 167 on Rolling Stone magazine's list of the 500 Greatest Songs of All Time; in a revised 2012 list, the song was ranked at number 168. In 2008, "Let's Get It On" was ranked #32 on Billboard magazine's Hot 100 All-Time Top Songs list.

== Plagiarism allegations ==
In August 2016, the family of Ed Townsend sued the English musician Ed Sheeran over his song "Thinking Out Loud", saying that "the melodic, harmonic, and rhythmic compositions of 'Thinking' are substantially and/or strikingly similar to the drum composition of 'Let's Get It On'." Two years later, in June 2018, Sheeran was again sued on similar grounds, this time for $100 million in damages by Structured Asset Sales, owners of one-third of the copyright to "Let's Get It On". The Townsend family claim was rejected in a jury trial in May 2023.

== Personnel ==
- Orchestral arrangement, Conducting: René Hall
- Bass: Wilton Felder
- Bongos: Eddie "Bongo" Brown
- Drums: Paul Humphrey
- Engineer: William McKeekin, Art Stewart, Cal Harris
- Guitar: Don Peake
- Mallet percussion: Emil Richards
- Percussion (Special treatment): Bobbye Hall Porter
- Saxophone: Ernie Watts, Plas Johnson
- Piano: Joe Sample
- Photography: Jim Britt, Motown Archives
- Production, lead vocals: Marvin Gaye
  - Co-production: Ed Townsend
- Vibraphone: Victor Feldman

== Charts ==
=== Weekly charts ===
Weekly chart performance for "Let's Get It On"
Chart (1973)	Peak position
Canada RPM Top Singles	11
UK Singles (Official Charts)	31
US Billboard Hot 100	1
US Billboard Hot Soul Singles	1

=== All-time charts ===
All-time chart performance for "Let's Get It On"
Chart (1958–2018)	Position
US Billboard Hot 100	41

== Certifications ==
Region	Certification	Certified units/sales
Denmark (IFPI Danmark)	Gold	45,000^{‡}
New Zealand (RMNZ)	2× Platinum	60,000^{‡}
United Kingdom (BPI) other 2004 release	Silver	200,000^{‡}
United Kingdom (BPI)	Platinum	600,000^{‡}
United States (RIAA) Mastertone	Platinum	1,000,000^{*}
United States (RIAA) 2005 remix	Gold	500,000^{*}
^{*} Sales figures based on certification alone.^{‡} Sales+streaming figures based on certification alone.

== Bibliography ==
- David Ritz; Ed Townsend; Ben Edmonds; Harry Weinger (2001). Marvin Gaye - Let's Get It On (Deluxe edition liner notes). Motown Records. MOTD 4757.
