= Inner City Blues (Make Me Wanna Holler) =

Single by Marvin Gaye

from the album What's Going On
- B-side: "Wholy Holy"
- Released: September 16, 1971
- Recorded: March 1971
- Studio: Hitsville U.S.A. (Studio A), Detroit
- Genre: Soul; funk; psychedelic soul
- Length: 5:28 (album version); 2:58 (single edit)
- Label: Tamla; T 54209
- Songwriters: Marvin Gaye & James Nyx Jr.
- Producer: Marvin Gaye

Marvin Gaye singles chronology
"Mercy Mercy Me (The Ecology)" (1971)	"Inner City Blues (Make Me Wanna Holler)" (1971)	"Save the Children" (1971)

"Inner City Blues (Make Me Wanna Holler)", often shortened to "Inner City Blues", is a song by Marvin Gaye, released as the third and final single, and the climactic song from his 1971 landmark album, What's Going On. Written by Gaye and James Nyx Jr., the song depicts the ghettos and bleak economic situations of inner-city America, and the emotional effects these have on inhabitants.

== Composition and lyrics ==
In 1998, co-writer James Nyx Jr. recalled, "Marvin had a good tune, sort of blues-like, but didn't have any words for it. We started putting some stuff in there about how rough things were around town. We laughed about putting lyrics in about high taxes, 'cause both of us owed a lot. And we talked about how the government would send guys to the moon, but not help folks in the ghetto. But we still didn't have a name, or really a good idea of the song. Then, I was home reading the paper one morning, and saw a headline that said something about the 'inner city' of Detroit. And I said, 'Damn, that's it. 'Inner City Blues'."

== Recording ==
The song was recorded in a mellow funk style with Gaye playing piano. Several of the Funk Brothers also contributed, including Eddie "Bongo" Brown, and bassist Bob Babbitt.

In its unedited version as it appears on the album, the final minute of the song (and of the LP) is a reprise to the theme of "What's Going On", the album's first song, then segues into a dark ending. This final minute was cut off of the single version, as well as other sections of the song so the single edit runs under three minutes—this edit appears on most reissues of the LP.

== Personnel ==
- Lead and background vocals by Marvin Gaye
- Piano by Marvin Gaye
- Instrumentation by The Funk Brothers and the Detroit Symphony Orchestra including:
  - Bobbye Hall – bongos

== Release and reception ==
Motown released "Inner City Blues" as a single on their Tamla label on October 14, 1971. Record World predicted that it would be Gaye's "third [single from What's Going On] to smash."

The song helped Gaye make history by being one of the few artists to have three or more Top 10 songs off Billboard's Pop Singles chart peaking at #9 and one of the first to have three consecutive #1 hits on Billboard's R&B Singles chart where it stayed for two weeks. Although not certified by the RIAA at that time, all three releases from the What's Going On album gained Gold status by selling over 1,000,000 copies in the United States.

== Chart performance ==
Chart (1971)	Peak position
Canadian RPM Top Singles	29
U.S. Billboard Hot 100	9
U.S. Billboard Hot R&B Singles	1

== Music video ==
A music video for the song was not released until 1994, when the Hughes brothers co-directed a video of the song for the reissue of What's Going On. The video was shot in Harlem over the course of five days, featuring visuals of poverty and inner-city depression. The brothers also filmed firefighters putting out a fire, claiming to police to have been shooting a documentary.
