= 'Til Tomorrow =

1983 single by Marvin Gaye

- 7" vinyl single cover

Single by Marvin Gaye

from the album Midnight Love
- B-side: "Rockin' After Midnight"
- Released: February 1983
- Recorded: August 1982 at Studio Katy, (Ohain, Belgium); Arco Studios, (Munich, Germany)
- Genre: R&B, soul
- Length: 4:57
- Label: Columbia
- Songwriter: Marvin Gaye
- Producer: Marvin Gaye

Marvin Gaye singles chronology
"My Love Is Waiting" (1983)	"'Til Tomorrow" (1983)	"Joy" (1983)

"'Til Tomorrow" is a 1982 R&B/soul quiet storm-styled song recorded by American singer Marvin Gaye. The song was the second US single from his Midnight Love album, and was released in February 1983. The release also served as a promotional song as Gaye prepared for a U.S. tour in the year of its release.

== Background ==
Released on his 1982 Midnight Love album, it was the only ballad in the album, which focused mainly on funk rhythms and dance material. Gaye was the sole lyricist of the song. When asked how the lyrics of the song seemed more primitive than his previous ballads, Gaye said that he had run out of ideas on lyrics.

The song is described as a bare-bones song with "heavenly scat riffs". Gaye provides accentuated doo-wop harmonies in the background, while delivering both a jazzy-inspired baritone and a gospel-inflected tenor with falsetto stuck in the middle of it. The original demo of the song (titled "Baby, Baby, Baby") showcased the frustration Gaye was going through during the recording of Midnight Love. The spoken intro by Gaye was later modified by the singer, while mention of the word "shit" was also taken off of the final track, as were extra lyrics added during the saxophone solo provided by Bobby Stern. The song was later covered by Chico DeBarge.

== Reception ==
Billboard called it "an intricate composition with some startling chords in the instrumental arrangements and harmonies."

== Chart performance ==
The song was issued as a single mainly for R&B radio while Gaye was prepping for his upcoming "Sexual Healing" tour, which took place in April 1983. Due to strong initial airplay, the song peaked at number thirty-one on the R&B singles chart.

== Credits ==
- All vocals by Marvin Gaye
- Instrumentation by the following:
  - Marvin Gaye: synthesizers
  - Gordon Banks: guitar, bass, drums
  - Bobby Stern: tenor saxophone solo
- Produced by Marvin Gaye
