= Just Like =

Single by Marvin Gaye

from the album Romantically Yours
- Released: 1985
- Recorded: 1978
- Genre: Soul, vocal jazz
- Length: 4:08
- Label: Columbia
- Songwriter: Marvin Gaye
- Producer: Marvin Gaye

Marvin Gaye singles chronology
"It's Madness" (1985)	"Just Like" (1985)	"The World Is Rated X" (1986)

"Just Like" is a song recorded by Marvin Gaye in 1978 but not released until after the release of Gaye's posthumous 1985 album Romantically Yours.

== Overview ==
The song was written and recorded by Gaye in the singer's recording studio in 1978 in sessions held for the recording of Gaye's albums, Here, My Dear and The Ballads. The song was written around the time that Gaye had finalized his divorce from Anna Gordy and was struggling in his second marriage to Janis Gaye. It is unclear if Gaye had wanted to include the song in The Ballads, because when the posthumous Vulnerable album came out in 1997, the song was left off the track listing.

Instead, following Marvin's death, Columbia Records worked with Gaye's former label, Motown, to bring leftover songs to fulfill what would have been Gaye's contractual obligations to Columbia (he had signed a three-album deal in 1982). "Just Like" was one of the songs on the posthumous 1985 album, Romantically Yours.

"Just Like" was later released as a single but failed to chart.
