= Midnight Lady (Marvin Gaye song) =

Song by Marvin Gaye

from the album Midnight Love
- Released: 1982
- Recorded: 1982, Studio Katy, Ohain, Belgium
- Genre: Synth-pop, funk
- Length: 5:17
- Label: Columbia
- Songwriter: Marvin Gaye
- Producer: Marvin Gaye

"Midnight Lady" is the first track on Marvin Gaye's 1982 album, Midnight Love. It contains sly references to Rick James and his hit, "Super Freak".

The song was never released as a single but was issued as the first track off Midnight Love.

== Background ==
By the recording of Midnight Love, Gaye was influenced by the different musical styles that were dominating the pop music scene of the 1980s from synthpop and new wave artists such as Duran Duran to rock artists such as John Lennon, a pop music contemporary he was often compared to, reggae legend Bob Marley and funk/R&B artists such as Prince, Michael Jackson and Rick James. For this song, the musical style of James, which mixed styles of funk, synthpop and new wave particularly on James' biggest crossover hit, "Superfreak", influenced the direction of what became "Midnight Lady". In its alternate demo version, later released on the Midnight Love and the Sexual Healing Sessions album, its original working title is "Clique Games/Rick James".

According to biographer David Ritz, Gaye told him, "Most of my life happens after midnight. Call me the 'Midnight Man'." Gaye played on most of the instruments on the song except for drums by James Gadson, the horn section by David Stout and The L.A. Horn Section and guitar by Gordon Banks. In the song, Gaye references going to a party "last Saturday night" where "the club was rocking/superfreaks were hanging out/wall to wall" and "something's going on in the men's room". Throughout the song, Gaye continues referencing the woman he's after as a "superfreak". Lyrically wise and musically wise, the influence of "Superfreak" was prominent. In one verse, Gaye tells the woman, "somebody said you was a superfreak/I'm here to tell you I'm a superfreak, baby." Gaye would later admit he was influenced by James for the duration of the album as it progressed.

== Credits ==
- Lead and background vocals by Marvin Gaye
- Written, arranged and produced by Marvin Gaye
- All instruments by Marvin Gaye except where notified:
  - James Gadson - drums
  - Gordon Banks - guitar
  - David Stout and The L.A. Horn Section - horns
- Horn arrangement by McKinley T. Jackson
