= Dream of a Lifetime =

Studio album by Marvin Gaye
- Released: May 21, 1985
- Recorded: 1971–1976, 1982–1983 (original); 1984–1985 (reworked)
- Length: 36:13
- Label: Columbia
- Producer: Marvin Gaye (original versions), Gordon Banks, Harvey Fuqua

Marvin Gaye chronology
Midnight Love (1982)	Dream of a Lifetime (1985)	Romantically Yours (1985)

Singles from Dream of a Lifetime
- 1. "Sanctified Lady" Released: 1985; 2. "It's Madness" Released: 1985

Dream of a Lifetime is the seventeenth and first posthumously released studio album by the American recording artist Marvin Gaye. It included the top five R&B single "Sanctified Lady".

== Background ==
In 1982, after final negotiations to leave Motown Records were completed, Marvin Gaye signed a three-album deal with Columbia Records. During the recording of his Midnight Love album, Gaye and his frequent collaborator Gordon Banks worked on a series of recordings, several of which made it to Midnight Love; recording continued into 1983 after Gaye returned to Los Angeles even while Gaye was promoting his album. Following the end of Gaye's final grueling U.S. tour, Gaye remained secluded in the home he shared with his parents at the West Adams district of Los Angeles. Prior to his death, Gaye had planned to work on a duet with Barry White, but White said that on the day they were to record in the studio, Gaye was shot and killed by his father. With two albums left from his Columbia contract, Columbia and Gaye's former label, Motown, began to work together to complete the singer's original contract to alleviate any debts left over by the singer after his death.

== Recording ==
In the summer of 1984, Harvey Fuqua and Gordon Banks worked on finishing or "modernizing" several of Gaye's songs left over from both Columbia and Motown recording sessions. Of the Columbia material, Banks brought in several tracks he and Gaye worked on together between 1982 and 1983 including a song that Gaye had mentioned to interviewers titled "Sanctified Pussy". Reworked, with vocals from several session background singers including the Waters, the song was renamed "Sanctified Lady". Despite being originally planned and expected by Gaye to be his next hit song after "Sexual Healing", the singer had warned that Columbia would not release it due to the song's offensive title and its lyrics. Another controversial song Gaye and Banks composed was "Masochistic Beauty", a song dedicated to S&M which Gaye played the role of a dominatrix in a faux British accent, where he rapped throughout the track. Banks provided vocoder in both "Sanctified Pussy" and "Masochistic Beauty", giving both songs an electro-funk flavor. Both tracks were unfinished outtakes from the Midnight Love sessions.

Fuqua assembled leftover sessions from Gaye's Motown days, including an obscure track Gaye composed on the fly as a joke titled "Savage in the Sack", a song David Ritz later stated was a song Gaye would not have wanted released. Originally, a vamp in the song had Gaye repeating the words, "dem niggers". In the remixed Fuqua production, it was rewritten as "it's getting bigger", with the Waters replacing Gaye on background vocals. The mid-tempo "Ain't It Funny How Things Turn Around", written and recorded around the time Gaye recorded Here, My Dear, was also remixed by Fuqua. The track later resurfaced in another remixed version, this time by Bootsy Collins in the deluxe edition re-issue of Here, My Dear. A 1971 track, "It's Madness", was also reworked with a modern drum programming beat over the original strings and music accompanying the song. "Symphony", a track recorded during the Let's Get It On sessions, was reworked with what sounded like beatboxing as its "drums". In the re-issue of Let's Get It On, the original recording was included. The seven-minute "Life's Opera" was recorded in 1976 and was remixed again by Fuqua with the Waters again adding background vocals. A 1972 track, "Dream of a Lifetime", later became the title of the album, and was written as a demo for Sammy Davis Jr., who did not record it.

== Reception ==
Professional ratings
Review scores
Source	Rating
Robert Christgau	C+
Rolling Stone	mixed link

Dream of a Lifetime found modest success after its release in May 1985. The leading single, "Sanctified Lady", reached No. 2 on the Hot R&B Singles chart, while "It's Madness" peaked at No. 55 on that chart. The album peaked at No. 8 on the R&B chart and No. 41 on the Billboard 200.

Nelson George of Spin wrote, "Clearly, side one is a reflection of his sexually troubled, drug-filled last year. Yet Marvin's attitude toward the material is hardly dire. He seems to revel in his outrageousness, and enjoys poking fun at his obsessions. The myth of Marvin Gaye, sexual sophisticate/sexual slave, will surely grow."

== Track listing ==
Side one

1. "Sanctified Lady" (Gordon Banks, Gaye) – 5:25
2. "Savage in the Sack" (Gaye) – 3:20
3. "Masochistic Beauty" (Gordon Banks, Gaye) – 4:39
4. "It's Madness" (Gaye) – 3:21

Side two

1. "Ain't It Funny (How Things Turn Around)" (Gaye) – 4:54
2. "Symphony" (Gaye, Smokey Robinson) – 2:50
3. "Life's Opera" (Gaye, Ivy Hunter) – 7:42
4. "Dream of a Lifetime" (Gaye) – 3:49

== Personnel ==
- Larkin Arnold – liner notes
- Gordon Banks – synthesizer, bass guitar, percussion, drums, background vocals, producer, engineer
- William Bryant – percussion
- Harvey Fuqua – synthesizer, bass guitar, percussion, drums, background vocals, producer
- Marvin Gaye – synthesizer, drums, keyboards, lead vocals, background vocals, producer (original versions)
- Connie Howard and the Waters – background vocals
- John Kovarek – engineer
- Barney Perkins – engineer
- Preston Wilcox – drums
