= Ego Tripping Out =

Single by Marvin Gaye
- B-side: 'Ego Tripping Out" (Instrumental)
- Released: September 17, 1979
- Recorded: 1979, Marvin's Room, Los Angeles, California
- Genre: Disco, Funk
- Length: (Original) 5:13 (Odyssey Version) 4:37 (AIR Version) 4:55
- Label: Tamla
- Songwriter: Marvin Gaye
- Producer: Marvin Gaye

Marvin Gaye singles chronology
"Anger" (1979)	"Ego Tripping Out" (1979)	"Praise" (1981)

"Ego Tripping Out" is a 1979 funk-styled dance record released by American soul singer Marvin Gaye, released as a single on the Tamla (Motown) label. The record was originally meant to be the lead single for the singer's aborted Love Man album. However, as the album was scrapped and reworked into In Our Lifetime, the song received further work, before being omitted from the final album tracklist. The single was later included in a 1994 re-release of In Our Lifetime and a 2007 re-release deluxe edition featured two different alternate mixes for the sessions of In Our Lifetime as well as the original Love Man single of it.

== Background ==
The song, written, composed, arranged and produced by Gaye himself, is a self-mockery of the singer's image and lifestyle. The songs is also a mockery at the image and lifestyle of several other entertainers, whose rising stardom rivaled Marvin's at the time. Certain lyrics (especially from the alternate sessions) could possibly indicate that Marvin is indirectly telling the listener to avoid falling into egotism and materialism, and embrace spirituality instead. Providing a semi-rap at the beginning of the song where he sang "I got the baddest cool/could never be the fool/the ladies wait to get down with me". These lyrics, along with others further expand the album's original theme of Marvin's love-related prowess: "Check out the love man standing tall and bold / Can fulfill your needs / Too cold, baby / Needless to say I'm your greatest play". The chorus of the song mentions the painful ego-ridden downside of being in the spotlight, and the final verse finds Marvin coming to grips with his crippling drug abuse: "Turn the fear to energy/cause the toot and the smoke won't fulfill the need".

Recorded first at Marvin's Room, and then Hawaii, this song was to be the lead the single of his next album Love Man. However, the album was withdrawn as Marvin felt it needed more work. After traveling to London, the song was remixed twice - once at Odyssey Studios, and also at AIR Studios with alternate lyrics, introduction, arrangement, and instrumentation (once by Marvin, next as an anonymous bonus track). The single version says "walking in my shoes/walking to the beat" while the remakes say "Walking in his shoes / Dancing to God's beat / Filled with this love inside / And this good old body heat / Baby you gotta spread the news / Oooh deep in my soul / I know it ain't about money". The alternate lyrics continue the religious and spiritual themes that Marvin carried in his music, which he further went into with the nearly-completed In Our Lifetime. However, neither of the two remakes made it directly to the released album but only appeared on the "Expanded Love Man Edition"; the song was ultimately replaced with "Far Cry."

In regards to the single and the overall album in general, Gaye stated in a 1980's interview:

"That was a single written about myself at a time when I was trying to get a handle on my ego, which was always at the forefront. I’m very self-centered and I feel like I’m it. When one is that ill, one has to deal with their ego. They ever really gave me a chance to complete it and when I did complete it, for some reason, they didn’t put it on the album. The album didn’t come out the way I had done it. It’s like taking a Leonardo da Vinci and submitting it to your agent and your agent has another artist paint a different smile or something on top of it. I view people tampering with my art in the same context.”

== Alternate versions ==
- "Ego Tripping Out" (Odyssey Studios Mix) – 4:37
- "Ego Tripping Out" (Air Studios Mix Outtakes) – 4:55
- "Ego Tripping Out" (extended) — 7:16 (from 1994 reissue In Our Lifetime: The Final Motown Sessions)

== Reception ==
The song, while not making it to the Billboard Hot 100, still made the R&B charts, peaking at #17. It would be Marvin's last Top 40 Billboard single at least on the R&B singles chart until 1981's "Praise".

Record World said that "Gaye lays down a funky-soul rap that, with a concurrent chorus and repetitious rhythm track, becomes a totally enveloping hypnotic experience."

== Music video ==
Marvin danced to the song on the talk show Dinah & Friends, where he was interviewed about how far he had come on what he called 'unpleasantries' of 1978.

== Samples ==
According to Genius, Bleu Collar sampled the song in "We Ain't Got Time".

== Personnel ==
- All vocals by Marvin Gaye
- Instrumentation by assorted musicians:
  - Guitars by Gordon Banks
  - Drums, piano, keyboard and synthesizers by Marvin Gaye
  - Saxophones by assorted musicians
  - Bass by Frank Blair

== Sources ==
- lyrics
