= Sanctified Lady =

Single by Marvin Gaye

from the album Dream of a Lifetime
- Released: 1985
- Recorded: Ohain, Belgium (1982); Los Angeles, California (1984)
- Genre: Funk; dance-pop
- Label: CBS
- Songwriters: Marvin Gaye; Gordon Banks
- Producers: Marvin Gaye; Gordon Banks

Marvin Gaye singles chronology
"Joy" (1983)	"Sanctified Lady" (1985)	"It's Madness" (1985)

"Sanctified Lady" is a song by American soul singer Marvin Gaye, released posthumously in 1985 by Columbia Records.

== Background ==
The title of the track was originally "Sanctified Pussy", a phrase which Gaye can be heard mumbling (appearing somewhat unedited) during certain parts of the updated chorus provided by The Waters, chants of "sanctified lady". Along with "Masochistic Beauty", the song was an outtake from the Midnight Love sessions, that remained unfinished due to the singer's death the previous year. Despite being incomplete and omitted from the album, the song was planned and expected by the singer to become his next big record and follow-up to "Sexual Healing".

The lyrics explore the singer's longing to find "that one woman who is untainted and incorruptible". Regarding the earlier receptions of the song and its title, Gaye once stated to ex-wife Janis that "Some say the song is beneath me. And yes, there is humor implicit in the title. But it is no joke. To find a church girl, pure and innocent... I need a woman as flawless as my own mother.”

Guitarist and longtime collaborator Gordon Banks (Gaye's brother-in-law) helped to finish the track by adding a choir and an electronic beat throughout the song, plus a vocodered chant of the title at the beginning.

== Reception ==
"Sanctified Lady" was issued as the first release from the singer's posthumous album Dream of a Lifetime, and despite the mumbling of Gaye's original title became a modest hit upon its release, reaching number 2 on the US R&B singles chart.

== Credits ==
- Lead vocals by Marvin Gaye and Gordon Banks (vocoder)
- Background vocals by The Waters
- Instrumentation by Marvin Gaye and Gordon Banks
- Produced by Gordon Banks
