= Marc Aryan =

French / Belgian / Armenian singer, songwriter, musician, music producer

- Born: Henri Markarian; September 14, 1926; Valence, France
- Died: November 30, 1985 (aged 59); Ohain, Belgium
- Occupations: Singer, Songwriter, Musician, Record producer
- Years active: 1959–1985

Henri Markarian, better known as Marc Aryan (14 November 1926 in Valence, France – 30 November 1985 in Ohain, Belgium), was a French-Belgian singer, songwriter, and record producer of Armenian descent born as a French citizen, who also acquired Belgian citizenship after a long residency in the country.

== Beginnings ==
Marc Aryan was born to Lebanese Armenian parents who came from Malatya, Turkey. He studied music and piano in Valence, and started writing his own songs. In 1957, he left Valence to Paris for better musical opportunities. In 1963, he went to Belgium where one of his sisters ran a nightclub in Zeebrugge on the coast. He tried his songs on the dance routines at the club gaining great favor. Marc Aryan decided to settle permanently in Belgium, first in Waterloo and eventually to Ohain.

== Career ==
Henri Markarian initially released materials under the personal label Markal. He then changed the name of the label to Malatya where his parents came from. He recorded several songs for an album released in Brussels. With initial success, Henri Markarian decided to adopt the stage name Marc Aryan (derived from pronunciation of his Armenian family name Markarian).

His singles became very popular in Belgian francophone market and in France. His single "Katy" that was released in 1964–1965, topped both Wallonia and Flanders Singles Charts becoming one of the top selling singles for 1965. He made sold-out concerts throughout Belgium. Other successful singles by him included "Volage Volage" (20 weeks in the Belgian Top 10), "Un Petit Slow" (again a #1 hit), "Angelina", "Giorgina", "Parce que je t'aime", "Si j'etais sur..", "Quand je te prends dans mes bras", "Qu'un peu d'amour", "Mon petit navire", "La chanson du viel aveugle" and "Tu es numéro 1 au hit-parade de mon cœur".

International success

After the successful years 1964 and 1965 locally, the years 1966 and 1969 proved to be his most prosperous years internationally. Marc Aryan enjoyed great popularity in the Middle East, particularly in Lebanon and Syria, where he also sang some songs in Armenian language and in Eastern Europe and Latin America. He had some commercial success in Quebec, Canada's predominantly francophone province.

Marc Aryan visited Turkey where his parents originated from. His success was huge after his release of the oriental-themed "Istanbul", one of his best known hits that became an instant classic in Turkey. He also released a number of re-arrangements of his biggest hits in Turkish language, following the example of famous European artists who had done the same like Salvatore Adamo, Johnny Hallyday, Sacha Distel, Enrico Macias and Peppino di Capri. Turkish language versions in his album Istanbul'da include 9 songs including "Yalancısın", "Dünya Dönüyor", "Kalbin Yok Mu?" and others. The Turkish lyrics were mostly written by Fecri Ebcioğlu.

In 1968, he also visited the Soviet Union where he sang for tens of thousands of fans in Moscow and other cities filling stadiums. Marc Aryan also eventually visited his homeland Armenia for very successful concert tour insisting to sing some songs in Armenian including the famous "Yerevan" dedicated to the Armenian capital.

== Markal Record Label ==
Marc Aryan founded his own record label named Markal where he released many of his songs. He also founded a music publishing house.

== Katy Studios and production work ==
Upon his return in 1969, he established a music studio he named Katy after his successful single "Katy". Many renowned artists recorded albums in Marc Aryan's studios including Julio Iglesias, Salvatore Adamo, Michel Fugain, Frédéric François, Will Tura, Danyel Gérard, Patrick Hernandez, Toots Thielemans.

Anthony Quinn recorded his successful hit "I Love You" in Marc Aryan's studio. Marvin Gaye recorded his album Midnight Love in Katy Studios in 1981. The album went on to earn Gaye two Grammy Awards.

== Personal life ==
Born in an ethnic Armenian family in 1926, he was the third of seven siblings. He had great affinity for languages, and was able to speak several language (up to 9). His love for music started very early to the detriment of school. He initially helped with his father's business in selling Middle Eastern food. He fell very ill while he was just 18, and left the father's business and later on, decided to concentrate on music, particularly finding success after moving to Belgium.

Marc Aryan died in 1985 in Belgium from a cardiac arrest. He was just 59. He had written more than 200 songs. There had been a confusion whether he was born in 1935 instead, but the tombstone confirms the year of birth as 1926.

His best songs were released in a double CD collection in 1974 again hitting the Top 10 of sales.

In 1997, a tribute concert entitled "Hommage à Marc Aryan" was held in Schaerbeek, in which his most well-known songs were interpreted by contemporary singers including Marka, Perry Rose, Dominique A, Jean-Luc of Sttellla, Be Plouvier, Zop Hophop and actor Benoit Poelvoorde.

== Discography ==
(in alphabetical order)

French language

- Adieu joli Luxembourg
- Adieu mon bel amour
- Agnes
- Allo c'est moi
- Amène ta semaine
- Angelina
- Arrête, arrête ton cinéma
- Au fond de tes yeux
- Ballade
- Bête à manger du foin
- Bien sûr, bien sûr
- Bonjour mon village, bonjour mon pays
- C'est bien dommage
- C'est impossible
- C'est la vie
- C'est le temps
- Car tu l'aimes
- Difficile à vivre
- Gino
- Giorgina
- Grosses lunettes sur un petit bout de nez
- Il y a des jours
- Istanbul
- J'aime (les petites femmes)
- J'aimerais sortir un soir avec vous
- J'aimerais viellir avec toi
- Jamais je ne dirai
- Je ne puis donner d'avantage
- Je t'invite
- Katy
- L'amour est une prison
- La chanson du viel aveugle
- La lettre
- La roue de secours
- La seule chose que tu n'as pas ratée
- La sirène
- Le clocher
- Le coeur au chomage
- Le livre de ma vie
- Le nombril du monde
- Le téléphone
- Les melons
- Les violons d'Albi
- Ma loulou
- Ma petite chanson
- Ma vie recommence avec toi
- Ma vie sans toi
- Marie Laurence
- Mes blanches montagnes
- Mon petit navire
- Mon village
- Numéro 1 au hit-parade
- Nous
- Parce que je t'aime
- Pas comme les autres
- Qu'un peu d'amour
- Quand je te prends dans mes bras
- Que c'est bête la vie
- Sans amour, on n'est rien du tout
- Sans toi
- Si
- Si demain
- Si j'avais su
- Si j'étais le fils d'un roi
- Si j'etais sur
- Si un jour
- Toi je te garde
- Toi ma bohème
- Tous ces voiliers
- Toute ma vie (tu es toute ma vie)
- Tu as beau me dire
- Tu dis chéri à tout le monde
- Tu es no. 1 au hit-parade de mon cœur
- Tu es une petite fille
- Tu ne sais pas
- Un amour
- Un jour
- Un paradis
- Un petit mari
- Un petit slow
- Un peu naif
- Volage Volage

Armenian language

- Yerevan

Turkish language

(French original title in parentheses)

- Dünya dönüyor [Atlı karınca] - (Volage Volage)
- Moda yolu - (Ma Loulou)
- Doğum günün kutlu olsun - (Feliz Cumpleanos)
- Mersi - (Volage Volage)
- Ayşe, Fatma, Semra [Eski Aşıklar]
- Kalbin yok mu?
- Yalancısın - (Si j'etais sur..)
- Nasıl evlenirsin bu lisanla (Giorgina)
- Kimdir bu sevgili (Un Petit Slow)
- Dinle yavrucuğum (Tu es une petite fille)

Collection albums

- 1994: 41 succès inoubliables (Ariane/AMC Records)
- 1998: L'essentiels 21 succès (Ariane/AMC Records)
