= Masochistic Beauty =

Song by Marvin Gaye

from the album Dream of a Lifetime
- Released: 1985
- Recorded: Ohain, Belgium (1982); Los Angeles, California (1984)
- Genre: Funk; dance-pop
- Label: CBS
- Songwriters: Marvin Gaye; Gordon Banks
- Producers: Marvin Gaye; Gordon Banks

"Masochistic Beauty" is a song by American soul singer Marvin Gaye, released posthumously in 1985 by Columbia Records.

== Background ==
Unlike the majority of Gaye's music, the song is a dedication to S&M, which was something that Gaye was known to have an interest in. The lyrics find Gaye playing the role of a Dom in a faux-English Received Pronunciation accent where he raps throughout the track. The song shares some similarities to "Sanctified Lady", receiving vocoder work from Gordon Banks, and having an electro-funk flavor. Both controversial tracks were also unfinished outtakes from the Midnight Love sessions, which received later work from Gordon Banks, and were released on the posthumous Dream of a Lifetime album.

== Credits ==
- Lead vocals by Marvin Gaye and Gordon Banks (vocoder)
- Instrumentation by Marvin Gaye and Gordon Banks
- Produced by Gordon Banks
