= Far Cry (Marvin Gaye song) =

Song by Marvin Gaye

from the album In Our Lifetime
- Released: 1981
- Recorded: 1980, Air Studios, London, England
- Genre: Funk/soul
- Length: 4:34
- Label: Tamla
- Songwriter(s): Marvin Gaye
- Producer(s): Marvin Gaye

"Far Cry" is the infamous unfinished recording that was included on singer Marvin Gaye's 1981 final Motown album, In Our Lifetime. The song, essentially a funk-styled instrumental, featured a vocally conscious Gaye mouthing words while playing multiple instruments, including the drums and keyboards, on the first part of the song. The brief second half features a jazz instrumental with Gaye playing piano and drums and singing in falsetto, while his fellow instrumentalists, bassist Frank Blair and guitarist Gordon Banks, accompany him. The song's release among the eight original recordings on In Our Lifetime angered Marvin to the point where he severed ties with Motown, his home for twenty years, leaving the label for Columbia. As he told his biographer David Ritz,

"I hadn't completed it....The song was in its most primitive stage. All I had was this jive vocal track, and they put it out as a finished fact. How could they embarrass me like that? I was humiliated. They also added guitar licks and bass lines. How dare they second guess my artistic decisions! Can you imagine saying to an artist, say Picasso, 'Okay, Pablo, you've been fooling with this picture long enough. We'll take your unfinished canvas and add a leg here, an arm there. You might be the artist, but you're behind schedule, so we'll finish up this painting for you. If you don't like the results, Pablo, baby, that's touch!'"

The song was later sampled for a song by rappers U-God and Snoop Dogg, who used parts of Gaye's vocals from the song for the single "Dance With Me" from one of his mixtapes in 2004. The re-release of In Our Lifetime, includes a six-minute version of the song that includes more of the jazz segue of the song, which was cut off on the album's initial release.

== Personnel ==
- All vocals, drums, keyboards, synthesizers and piano by Marvin Gaye
- Bass by Frank Blair
- Guitar by Gordon Banks
