= My Love Is Waiting =

"My Love is Waiting"
- 7" vinyl single cover

Single by Marvin Gaye

from the album Midnight Love
- B-side: "Rockin' After Midnight"
- Released: December 1982 (UK)
- Recorded: 1982 at Studio Katy, (Ohain, Belgium)
- Genre: Electro, synth-pop, soul, R&B
- Length: 3:49 (single version); 5:07 (album version)
- Label: CBS
- Songwriter: Gordon Banks
- Producer: Marvin Gaye

Marvin Gaye singles chronology
"Sexual Healing" (1982)	"My Love is Waiting" (1982)	"'Til Tomorrow" (1983)

"My Love Is Waiting" is a 1982 R&B/soul song written by musician Gordon Banks and recorded and released by American singer Marvin Gaye, as a European-only single in early 1983, it was also the last track on Gaye's final album in his lifetime, Midnight Love; released in 1982.

== Background ==
The song was written by Banks with another act in mind that he was producing back in the United States. While working with Gaye in Europe, first on several tours and then together at a Belgian recording studio where they recorded Gaye's Midnight Love album, Gaye had struggled to complete his new record, his first outside Motown. Upon hearing the demo of Banks' song, Gaye requested to record the song, which Banks agreed. Gaye and Banks produced the song and arranged his vocals, recording multi-layered background vocals on one date, and a solo lead the next. Surprisingly, Gaye made just a few additions to this song. This was the final song Gaye recorded and finalized for Midnight Love.

In the song, he begins it by thanking several people for helping him make the album for CBS Records, including Harvey Fuqua, Gordon Banks, Mike Butcher, CBS' black music chief Larkin Arnold, and "most of all, we want to thank our Heavenly father, Jesus!" before the song's melody emerges. The song is about a man coming back to an old lover after several months apart. The song's ironic message was also partially due to Gaye returning to the arms of his fans after a five-year layoff. Gaye would return to the United States in late 1982 following the release of Midnight Love. During his "Sexual Healing Tour", Gaye would end his shows with the song being played as an instrumental outro where he took the time to thank several of his close friends and family, and also, like the song itself, also thanked God saying "I still love Jesus!" Gaye died two years later in 1984, making the words seem prophetic.

== Chart performances and re-releases ==
While it was never issued as a single in the US, it did register on the UK Singles Chart peaking at number 34 on the chart and the Dutch singles chart where it peaked at number 5. There is also an alternate version that can be found on the Midnight Love and the Sexual Healing Sessions, that is longer than the final version released on the Midnight Love album.

== Personnel ==
- All vocals, synthesizers and Hammond organ by Marvin Gaye
- Drums, guitar, bass and Fender Rhodes piano by Gordon Banks
- Music and lyrics written by Gordon Banks
- Produced by Marvin Gaye
