= Life Is for Learning =

"Life is for Learning"
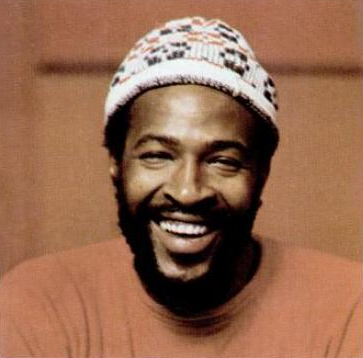

Song by Marvin Gaye

from the album In Our Lifetime
- Released: 1981
- Recorded: 1980, Air Studios, London, England
- Genre: Soul
- Length: 3:41
- Label: Tamla
- Songwriter(s): Marvin Gaye
- Producer(s): Marvin Gaye

"Life Is for Learning" is a song recorded by singer Marvin Gaye for his "In Our Lifetime" album in 1981, released by Tamla. It has been sampled by 2nd II None on "Underground Terror" in 1991; by Esham on "No Singing/misery" in 1993; by 8Ball on "The Artist Pays the Price" in 1998; and by Mista Rodd feat. Jazze Pha on "Cheeze" in 1999.

Recorded in 1980, the singer expressed the differences between songs that preached or talked about love, forgiveness and other positive subjects and songs that talked about pain and lust and were mostly negative in nature. Recorded during the singer's exile in London, the song could relate to Marvin's state of mind when recording songs both of a spiritual and sexual nature; explaining his "divided soul" as author David Ritz commented in his biography of the singer. The song was originally titled "Life is Now in Session" and was originally supposed to be included in Marvin's '"Love Man'" album from 1979 but the album was shelved.

In the volume "Afro-Pentecostalism: Black Pentecostal and Charismatic Christianity in History and Culture" Professor Amos Yong considers " Life Is for Learning". He draws attention to the lines "The Devil has his special plan to make hot songs for sinners, Thank God we'll turn it around and make good songs for winners" and notes Gaye's struggles with the temptation of "flesh, stupid flesh". Yong found that "No one male black singer, outside of the contemporary singer R. Kelly, has so openly and honestly dealt with both his sexuality and his spirituality in such raw terms."

That conflict was examined by the author Michael Eric Dyson who commented that "Marvin Gaye struggled his entire career to reconcile sweet flesh and sustaining faith.The tension between sexuality and spirituality led him down troubled paths in his personal life and to artistic glory." Analysing '"Life Is for Learning", Dyson felt the artist was expressing his love for God while torn by his love of women, his broken relationships had "left marks all over his art". In "Mercy, Mercy Me: The Art, Loves and Demons of Marvin Gaye", Dyson noted the song's "seductive, grinding, funk groove, carved from sax and vibes" which contrasted with the theological theme.

A more controversial interpretation of the song was given by David Ritz: "In Life Is for Learning" Marvin saw himself as Jesus suffering for the world's sins though he didn't evoke the actual name of Christ." Ritz again felt the tension in the song between the artist's thirst for God with his desire for women, claiming that when composing this song and the rest of the album Gaye "was haunted by the same sexual image, the dancing woman moving towards him. Her presence excited his poetry, blessing it with a spiritual sensuality that turned his dark mood bright."

== Personnel ==
- All vocals, drums and keyboards by Marvin Gaye
- Guitar by Gordon Banks
- Other instrumentation uncredited
