= Joy (Marvin Gaye song) =

- 12" vinyl maxi-single cover

Single by Marvin Gaye

from the album Midnight Love
- B-side: "Turn On Some Music"
- Released: March 1983 (UK)
- Recorded: 1982, Studio Katy, Ohaine, Belgium
- Genre: Funk, synth-pop, dance-pop
- Length: 4:22 (Album version)
- Label: Columbia
- Songwriter: Marvin Gaye
- Producer: Marvin Gaye

Marvin Gaye singles chronology
"'Til Tomorrow" (1983)	"Joy" (1983)	"Sanctified Lady" (1985)

"Joy" is a 1983 single released by Marvin Gaye, the final single issued from his Midnight Love album. The song, which was built around a funk vibe, was inspired by Gaye's religious background, which had also inspired songs such as "God Is Love", "Everybody Needs Love" and "Praise". Gaye introduced the song as a tribute to his father during his 1983 concert tour.

It was also the final single released before Gaye's death in 1984.

== Track listing ==
7" single

1. "Joy" – 3:55
2. "Turn On Some Music" – 5:08

12" single

1. "Joy" (Parts 1 & 2) (Special Extended Remix) – 6:40
2. "Turn On Some Music" – 5:08

== Credits ==
- All vocals by Marvin Gaye
- Instrumentation by:
  - Marvin Gaye: drums, Fender Rhodes, synthesizers, bass synthesizers
  - Gordon Banks: guitars, bass
  - Bobby Stern: tenor saxophone solo

== Chart performance ==
The song peaked at number seventy-eight on the Billboard R&B singles chart, and was the last single Gaye released while alive. Three later posthumous releases would reach the Billboard R&B top 40 over the next twenty years.
