= A Funky Space Reincarnation =

Single by Marvin Gaye

from the album Here, My Dear
- B-side: "A Funky Space Reincarnation, Pt. 2"
- Released: February 11, 1979
- Recorded: 1977
- Studio: Marvin's Room, Los Angeles
- Genre: Funk
- Length: 8:17
- Label: Tamla
- Songwriter(s): Marvin Gaye
- Producer(s): Marvin Gaye

Marvin Gaye singles chronology
"Pops, We Love You" (1978)	"A Funky Space Reincarnation" (1979)	"Anger" (1979)

Here, My Dear track listing
- 14 tracks Side one: 1. "Here, My Dear"; 2. "I Met a Little Girl"; 3. "When Did You Stop Loving Me, When Did I Stop Loving You"; 4. "Anger"; Side two: 1. "Is That Enough"; 2. "Everybody Needs Love"; 3. "Time to Get It Together"; Side three: 1. "Sparrow"; 2. "Anna's Song"; 3. "When Did You Stop Loving Me, When Did I Stop Loving You (instrumental)"; Side four: 1. "A Funky Space Reincarnation"; 2. "You Can Leave, but It's Going to Cost You"; 3. "Falling in Love Again"; 4. "When Did You Stop Loving Me, When Did I Stop Loving You (reprise)"

"A Funky Space Reincarnation" is a 1978 jazz-funk single recorded and released in 1979 by Marvin Gaye on the Tamla label.

In the song, Gaye describes a parallel universe in the future where he is captain of a "space bed" and meets a woman that reminds him of his first wife, Anna. He then tells the woman that they would probably get "married in June" and tells her to "smoke a joint from out of Venus".

The song seems to have been inspired by the likes of funk musicians such as Parliament-Funkadelic and Earth, Wind & Fire. Its musical arrangement is a reprise of his song "Anger", found earlier on the album.

Record World said that "Gaye's characteristic smooth vocals adapt perfectly to this slick funk style with a driving beat and a message in the lyrics."

The song became a modest hit on the R&B charts, where it peaked at No. 23. In the music video he wears a glittering red outfit and is surrounded by a band (presumably his own) and a duo of female dancers. His face is given several close-ups during the video.

== Use in popular media ==
In 2007 the song was used in the advert for the Dior perfume J'adore starring Charlize Theron.

Singer Musiq Soulchild sampled the song in his song, "Until", featured on his OnMyRadio album, in 2009.

== Personnel ==
- All vocals, keyboards and synthesizers by Marvin Gaye
- Produced, written, arranged and composed by Marvin Gaye
- Drums by Bugsy Wilcox
- Guitar by Gordon Banks
- Bass by Frank Blair
- Trumpet by Nolan Smith
