= In Our Lifetime =

In Our Lifetime may refer to:

- In Our Lifetime (Marvin Gaye album), 1981
  - "In Our Lifetime" (Marvin Gaye song)
- In Our Lifetime (Dave Douglas album), 1995
- In Our Lifetime (Eightball & MJG album), 1999
- "In Our Lifetime" (Texas song)
