= Vulnerable (Marvin Gaye album) =

Studio album by Marvin Gaye
- Released: April 22, 1997
- Recorded: 1968; New York (original music), 1977–78; 1997 (reworked) at Marvin Gaye's Studios (Hollywood, California)
- Genres: Traditional pop, soul jazz, R&B
- Length: 28:30
- Label: Motown
- Producers: Marvin Gaye, Bobby Scott, Amy Herot

Marvin Gaye chronology
Anthology (1995)	Vulnerable (1997)	Midnight Love and the Sexual Healing Sessions (1998)

Vulnerable is the third posthumous album by Marvin Gaye. Recorded in sessions throughout 1977, the album was a decade in the making, first being worked on in 1968 during sessions in New York with Bobby Scott. Reworked by Gaye a decade later, the album was originally going to be released in 1979 under the title, The Ballads, but was shelved. Two decades later, Motown released it under the title Vulnerable, including seven songs from the sessions and three alternate cuts.

== Overview ==
=== Background ===
In 1968, Marvin Gaye went to New York to record a series of ballads with arranger Bobby Scott, as Gaye continued his attempts to become a successful pop crooner. Sessions ended abruptly, however, when Gaye was unsatisfied with his vocals. Disappointed, he stopped pursuing a career as a crooner, while recording pop hits for Motown. In 1973, vocals for the album seven tracks were made, but they were only released in 2023 on the digital-only 50th anniversary reissue of Let's Get It On. In 1977, two years after buying his own studio, and shortly after reworking the live album, Live at the London Palladium, Gaye began to return to finishing up work on his shelved ballads project.

Inspired by his tempestuous relationships with his wives Anna Gordy and Janis Hunter, Gaye added more of a personal depth in the songs he recorded for the album.

According to David Ritz, Gaye considered the final takes to be his masterpiece, telling Ritz, "Don't let 'em forget the ballads." During Ritz's 1982 visit to Gaye in Belgium, they listened to a tape of the ballad recording, and it was then that Ritz offered the name Vulnerable for the project.

=== Recording ===
Recording sessions for the album started in 1977 at Marvin's recording studio. Some of the songs were constantly reworked by Gaye until he was satisfied with what he had recorded. "Why Did I Choose You" was recorded twice, as was "I Wish I Didn't Love You So", "I Won't Cry Anymore" and "The Shadow of Your Smile". Other songs Gaye recorded were songs of his own compositions including "Stranger in My Life", "Walkin' in the Rain" and "Just Like".

"She Needs Me" is a cover of Peggy Lee's single "He Needs Me", from 1955.

Eventually satisfied with the music, he titled it The Ballads and had it ready for a 1979 release with Motown. However, due to the fall out over his album, Here, My Dear, Gaye shelved the project indefinitely despite telling author David Ritz that he felt the album was "the best stuff I ever did". It would stay on the shelf for nearly a decade.

=== Romantically Yours and the release of Vulnerable ===
In 1985, Columbia released the third and last Marvin Gaye album featured on their contract with Gaye. Columbia's parent label, CBS worked together with Motown to issue 'lost' recordings. Releasing Romantically Yours, the album featured the 1968 vocal version of "Why Did I Choose You" and two alternate 1977 recorded vocal versions of "I Won't Cry Anymore" and "The Shadow of Your Smile" among others.

In April 1997, Motown finally issued the long-awaited 1970s sessions from The Ballads, renaming the project as Vulnerable. This featured a front cover of Gaye in a picture culled from the photo sessions of What's Going On and had the background animated to black with just his face showing. Three alternate versions of "Why Did I Choose You", "I Wish I Didn't Love You So" and "I Won't Cry Anymore" were featured on the album in which Marvin introduced vocal ad-libs, especially on "I Wish I Didn't Love You So". Gaye improvised his own lyrics for the alternate version of "I Won't Cry Anymore".

== Critical reception ==
Professional ratings
Review scores
Source	Rating
AllMusic	2.5/5 stars
Rolling Stone	3/5 stars

Stephen Thomas Erlewine of AllMusic says, "Was it worth the wait? For dedicated fans, it certainly was, since Gaye's voice is as beautiful and soulful as ever. However, anyone who is not a dedicated fan will find Vulnerable intriguing but significantly flawed, especially since several of the songs seem ill-suited for Gaye's seductive vocals. Which means that even though Vulnerable is a nice addendum to his catalog, it's little more than a curiosity."

Tom Moon of Rolling Stone writes, "Though he didn’t complete a full album of these songs, the seven restrained performances and three equally compelling alternate takes prove that Gaye could turn even the most hackneyed lounge-act tunes into forthright, spellbinding testimony."

Reuben Jackson of The Washington Post concludes his review with, "Sadly, Gaye's 1984 death at the hands of his father robbed the singer of the opportunity to go further with the kind of material heard on Vulnerable."

== Track listing ==
No.	Title	Writer(s)	Length
1.	"Why Did I Choose You?"	Michael Leonard; Herbert Martin	2:38
2.	"She Needs Me"	Arthur Hamilton	3:26
3.	"Funny (Not Much)"	Bob Merrill; Marcia Neil; Philip Broughton; Hughie Prince	2:44
4.	"This Will Make You Laugh"	Irene Higginbotham	2:53
5.	"The Shadow of Your Smile"	Johnny Mandel; Paul Francis Webster	3:08
6.	"I Wish I Didn't Love You So"	Frank Loesser	2:35
7.	"I Won't Cry Anymore"	Al Frisch; Fred Wise	3:00
8.	"Why Did I Choose You?" (Alternate vocal)	Michael Leonard; Herbert Martin	2:37
9.	"I Wish I Didn't Love You So" (Alternate vocal)	Frank Loesser	2:36
10.	"I Won't Cry Anymore" (Alternate vocal)	Al Frisch; Fred Wise	2:53
Total length:			28:30

== Personnel ==
- Ramon Aninag – project assistant
- Candace Bond – executive producer
- Koji Egawa – assistant engineer
- Carol Friedman – art direction, photography, still pictures
- Marvin Gaye – vocals, producer, vocal producer, piano
- David Harley – art direction
- John Hendrickson – engineer
- Amy Herot – producer
- Gavin Lurssen – mastering
- David Moss – tape archivist, librarian
- David Ritz – liner notes, essay
- Bob Schaper – editing, editing engineer
- Bill Schnee – mixing
- Bobby Scott – arranger, producer, orchestral arrangements, orchestra production
- Dana Smart – production co-ordination, project co-ordinator
- Art Stewart – producer
- Georgia Ward – tape archivist

Track information and credits verified from the album's liner notes.
