= It's Madness =

Single by Marvin Gaye

from the album Dream of a Lifetime
- Released: 1985
- Recorded: Early 1970s, Detroit, Michigan
- Genre: Soul, pop
- Label: CBS Records
- Songwriter: Marvin Gaye
- Producer: Harvey Fuqua

Marvin Gaye singles chronology
"Sanctified Lady" (1985)	"It's Madness" (1985)	"Just Like" (1986)

"It's Madness" was the second posthumous record released by American soul singer Marvin Gaye, released off his Dream Of A Lifetime album, in 1985.

The second posthumous release following up the successful hit, "Sanctified Lady", which missed a chance of giving Gaye his fourteenth number-one R&B single; "It's Madness" was brought out from old Motown archives from the early-'70s.

The song's melancholy vibe was reminiscent of Marvin's recordings during the 1970s and could have likely have been recorded as a demo for Sammy Davis Jr., who briefly signed with the label (Gaye had also wanted to give Davis the song "Dream of a Lifetime" though he was unable to).

Written by Marvin and produced with an eighties pop flourish by his longtime mentor Harvey Fuqua, the song was released and peaked at number fifty-five on the R&B singles chart. It has since been issued on later compilations released of Marvin's music from his later years.

== Reception ==
Nelson George of Spin wrote, "The ballad has Marvin crying out that the loss of a lover has driven him near insanity."

== Credits ==
- All vocals by Marvin Gaye
- Written by Marvin Gaye
- Produced by Harvey Fuqua
