= Heavy Love Affair =

1981 Marvin Gaye single

Single by Marvin Gaye

from the album In Our Lifetime
- Released: 1981
- Recorded: 1980, Air Studios, London, England
- Genre: Funk, soul
- Length: 3:45
- Label: Tamla
- Songwriter: Marvin Gaye
- Producer: Marvin Gaye

Marvin Gaye singles chronology
"Praise" (1981)	"Heavy Love Affair" (1981)	"Sexual Healing" (1982)

"Heavy Love Affair" is a funk song recorded by American soul singer Marvin Gaye. Released as the second and last single off Gaye's last Motown album, In Our Lifetime, in 1981, the song was based on Gaye's real-life emotional crisis after being separated from his wife at the time. In some parts of the song, Gaye knows that he's a major female attraction but still feels the warmth of his lost love saying "lots of ladies love me/but it's still a lonesome town" bringing that point clearer in the next verse saying "you got me looking for love (again)". The song became one of his lowest-charted Billboard hits on the R&B side reaching just #61 there and becoming the final release of Gaye's on the Tamla (Motown) label before he left the label for Columbia the next year. The musical background of this song originally came from the song, "Life's a Game of Give and Take" from Marvin's aborted 1979 release, Love Man.

Record World described the song as a "hypnotic single" and praised Gaye's "trademark cool tenor" and the graceful "light funk line" in the music.
