= Praise (Marvin Gaye song) =

Single by Marvin Gaye

from the album In Our Lifetime
- B-side: "Funk Me"
- Released: 1981
- Recorded: 1980, AIR Studios, London, England
- Genre: Funk, soul
- Length: 4:51 (Album version 3:52 (Single release)
- Label: Tamla
- Songwriter: Marvin Gaye
- Producer: Marvin Gaye

Marvin Gaye singles chronology
"Ego Tripping Out" (1979)	"Praise" (1981)	"Heavy Love Affair" (1981)

"Praise" is a 1981 gospel-inspired disco number released by American soul singer Marvin Gaye. The song, written by Gaye, is a tribute to not only his church upbringing but also to the sound of then-label mate Stevie Wonder, who is given a shout out on the song by Gaye. In the song, he persuades a lady to be positive in difficult times and let her "love come shining through". He then moves forward to praise God, similar to how a preacher would recite such passages from The Bible.

The song, equipped with horns, a propulsive drum beat, and Gaye's multi-layered vocals, was Gaye's second Top 40 hit since "A Funky Space Reincarnation" on Billboard's Hot Soul Singles chart, where it peaked at number 18 on that chart while reaching #101 on Billboard's Bubbling Under the Hot 100. "Praise" was the first release off Gaye's controversial recording, In Our Lifetime.

Record World said that it's "guaranteed to get the body moving with its salsa rhythm and Gaye's unmistakable romantic croon."

== Notes on evolution ==
The song was originally recorded in 1979 under the title "A Lover's Plea" from the singer's shelved Love Man album. It contained a piano riff of notes B B C# B, B B C# B. This was subsequently removed and replaced with a xenon filter. Motown replaced it with synths similar to "Ego Tripping Out."

== Chart positions ==
Chart (1981)	Peak position
U.S. Billboard Hot Soul Singles	18

== Personnel ==
- All vocals by Marvin Gaye
- Instrumentation by assorted musicians
