= Sexual Healing =

1982 single by Marvin Gaye

Single by Marvin Gaye

from the album Midnight Love
- B-side: "Sexual Healing" (instrumental version)
- Released: October 9, 1982
- Studio: Studio Katy (Ohain, Belgium)
- Genre: R&B; post-disco; soul; funk
- Length: 3:59 (album version); 4:05 (single version); 4:39 (alternate vocal)
- Label: Columbia; CBS Records
- Songwriters: Marvin Gaye; Odell Brown; David Ritz
- Producer: Marvin Gaye

Marvin Gaye singles chronology
"Heavy Love Affair" (1981)	"Sexual Healing" (1982)	"My Love Is Waiting" (1983)

Audio sample
- file; help

Music video
- "Sexual Healing" on YouTube

"Sexual Healing" is a song recorded by American singer and songwriter Marvin Gaye. Co-written by Gaye, Odell Brown and David Ritz, it was the leading single from Gaye's sixteenth studio album, Midnight Love released in October 1982 by Columbia Records.

The song was conceived in Ostend, where Gaye had relocated to after spending over a year in London as a tax exile and struggling with his career and personal life. The lyrics were conceived after co-writer and journalist David Ritz discovered sadomasochist drawings in Gaye's Ostend apartment and told Gaye he needed "sexual healing". Gaye convinced Ritz to write lyrics to the song, which the singer later edited and arranged, along with the musical composition with Brown.

Gaye's first single since leaving Motown months prior, it produced a comeback for Gaye as the song reached number-one on the Hot R&B/Hip-Hop Songs (then Black Singles chart) in just four weeks, where it stayed for a then record-setting ten weeks, where according to Billboard, it was the fastest rising single to reach number one in five years. A huge crossover hit, it peaked at number three on the Billboard Hot 100 in January 1983 and also reached the top ten in seven territorial countries and peaked at number one in Canada and New Zealand. With sales of over four million copies worldwide, it is Gaye's most successful single and his final hit as he would die roughly 18 months after its release in April 1984. It later won Gaye two Grammy Awards and an American Music Award and was ranked the top-selling R&B single of 1983.

The song is listed at number 198 on Rolling Stone's list of 500 Greatest Songs of All Time.

== Background ==
In January 1981, Gaye had relocated to Ostend, Belgium from London, where he had spent over a year at as a tax exile as he was being sought by the Internal Revenue Service in his native United States for failure to pay taxes as well as alimony payments to his first ex-wife Anna Gordy Gaye and his estranged second wife Jan, with whom his divorce wouldn't be finalized until November 1982.

At the same time, Gaye's longtime label Motown had hastily released his concept album, In Our Lifetime, which angered the singer to the point that he decided he would no longer record for the label after 20 years, accusing the label of betraying his creativity. Gaye's move to Ostend was orchestrated by Belgian music and sports promoter Freddy Couseart, who hoped to save Gaye from a debilitating drug addiction that had consumed him for years. Gaye began exercising and boxing at a local Ostend gym while also cutting down on his cocaine use, attending a local church and partaking in Belgian culture.

While still with Motown, Gaye had received offers from labels including I.R.S. Records, Arista Records and Elektra Records; afterward, he sought to make a deal with CBS Records after they offered him a contract. CBS agreed to sign him and help clear his financial debt, and spent a year negotiating. In the meantime, Gaye needed spending money, so Cousaert set him up with a month-long England tour between June 13 and July 1, 1981. The tour was called "A Heavy Love Affair Tour 1981", named after his song "Heavy Love Affair", from In Our Lifetime. After returning to Belgium that July, Gaye performed two shows at Ostend's Casino Kursaal on July 3 and 4, 1981.

== Production and composition ==
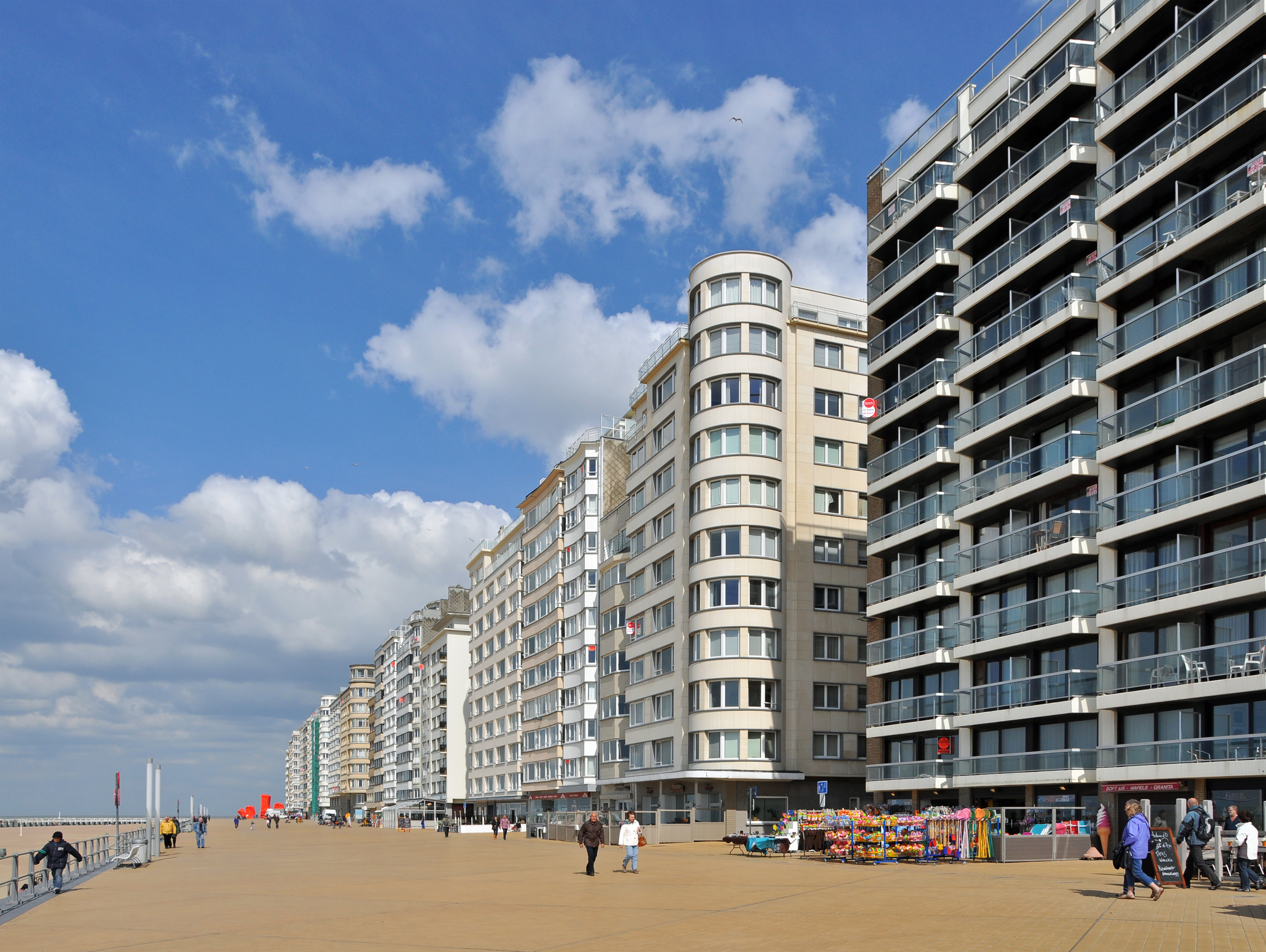
"Sexual Healing" was conceived at Gaye's rented apartment at the Albert-I Promenade in Ostend, Belgium.

At the end of the tour, two of Gaye's musicians, Gordon Banks and Odell Brown, had decided to stay in Ostend as Gaye had been planning on new musical material after being exposed to reggae music while in England. With just Gordon Banks and Odell Brown, Gaye composed a reggae-inspired instrumental. Gaye used a Roland TR-808 drum machine to create the percussion; he was drawn to the instrument because he could use it to create music without other musicians or producers.

Gaye was still working on the track when David Ritz, then a reviewer for Rolling Stone, arrived at Ostend in April 1982 to locate Gaye as the two had been working together on Gaye's planned autobiography. Couseart recalled that neither him nor Gaye wanted him around. At the time, Gaye was living at a seafront apartment at Residence Jane on the Albert-I Promenade 77 where the song had been conceived. Upon Ritz's arrival, Gaye allowed him entry and played him the instrumental he had been working on for months. It was while there that Ritz discovered sadomasochist drawings in the singer's possession and advised Gaye that he needed "sexual healing". When Ritz explained to an amused Gaye what that meant, the singer told him to "write a poem" while he came up with the melody.

According to Ritz, who had never written a song before, he wrote several verses which Gaye edited and rearranged, adding in his own lyrics to the music. In an interview with HUMO in 1994, Cousaert claimed the only songwriters were Gaye and Brown and stated Ritz's contribution was giving Gaye the title of the song. In Frankie Gaye's memoirs, My Brother, Marvin, the singer's brother claimed Ritz had told him, "not only are you sexy, your music is healing," inspiring Gaye to write the lyrics himself. Gordon Banks told The Atlantic in 2012 that the conversation between Gaye and Ritz had nothing to do with Marvin's S&M collection but because Gaye had been intrigued by Amsterdam's red light district, to which Ritz replied that Gaye needed sexual healing but said he had nothing to do with the creation of the song. Odell Brown stated he never met Ritz and assumed Ritz was just there for an interview for Rolling Stone. Gaye himself acknowledged Ritz for inspiring the song's title name. The song was eventually recorded at Studio Katy in Ohain, Belgium.

After finding out his name was not listed in the credits, Ritz sued the singer for $15 million for partial credit, which put an end to their friendship, according to Ritz as Gaye wasn't happy about the suit and stopped communicating with the journalist. Ritz would eventually be credited in 1988 after settling with Gaye's estate.

"Sexual Healing" has been described as a post-disco, soul and funk song. The song is written and composed in the key of E-flat major and is set in time signature of 4/4 with a tempo of 94 beats per minute. It begins with a deep bass drum followed by "tinny" handclaps, "ticky" snare, and "tishy" hi-hats generated by a Roland TR-808 drum machine.

The first vocal sounds are of whisper chants of "get up" and "wake up", recorded by singer Harvey Fuqua, an early mentor of Gaye's who assisted him in the song's production. The song is backed by keyboards, synthesizers, drum programming and rhythm guitar. Background vocals in the song were provided by Gaye and Gordon Banks, who played guitar. The song ends with Gaye repeating the chorus line. As it fades out, Gaye can be heard singing, "please don't procrastinate, it's not good to masturbate."

== Critical reception ==
In his review of Midnight Love for Rolling Stone, Dave Marsh described "Sexual Healing" as a track that was "sort of a polemic for the power of rampant humping." Blender described it as "the plaintively blue-balled model for basically every slow jam" since its release. An AllMusic reviewer stated Gaye had "concocted a pioneering percussive sound that was balladic in taste but stimulating in feel." In its end-year lists of 1982, Rolling Stone, NME, and The Village Voice listed it as one of the "songs of the year" with the latter two ranking it at number two. People described it as "America's hottest pop-culture turn-on" since Olivia Newton-John's single "Physical".

== Chart performance ==
"Sexual Healing" was released as the first single off the Midnight Love album on October 9, 1982. Just a week later, on October 16, it debuted at number 25 on Billboard's Black Singles chart, the "Hot Shot Debut" of that week. Just four weeks later on November 6, it topped the chart, replacing Evelyn "Champagne" King's "Love Come Down" at the top spot.

On the same issue, the magazine noted that it was the fastest rising R&B single in five years. It would stay at number one for ten consecutive weeks, surpassing his 1968 hit single "I Heard It Through the Grapevine" as his longest-running number-one hit and tying a then all-time record with Ray Charles's "I Can't Stop Loving You" as the longest running number one R&B single in history after Billboard consolidated its R&B charts in 1958.

"Sexual Healing" debuted at number 78 on the Billboard Hot 100 on October 30, 1982, marking Gaye's return to the Hot 100 after "Got to Give It Up" in 1977. On November 20, it vaulted from number 52 to number 19 in its fourth week. It entered the top ten of the chart at number 8 on December 11, becoming Gaye's 18th and final top ten hit of his career. Eight weeks later, on January 29, 1983, it reached its peak of number three on the chart behind Men at Work's "Down Under" and Toto's "Africa".

The song was a success on Billboard's other charts, reaching number 12 on the Hot Dance Club Play chart and number 34 on the Adult Contemporary chart. The song reached number one on Canada's RPM chart.

It peaked at number four on the UK Singles Chart and Australia's Kent Music Report. On Belgium's Ultratop 50 chart, the song reached number two. It reached number one on New Zealand's RIANZ chart, where it stayed at the top spot for six weeks. It reached number three on the Dutch Top 40 in the Netherlands and number seven on the Irish Singles Chart in Ireland. In other countries, success was more modest: West Germany's Media Control Charts, Switzerland's Swedish Singles Chart, and Italy's Italian Singles Chart, where it reached numbers 23, 17, and 37, respectively. It ultimately sold over four million worldwide.

== Awards and accolades ==
"Sexual Healing" won several music industry awards. At the 1983 Grammy Awards, the song won Gaye two Grammys, including Best Male R&B Vocal Performance and Best R&B Instrumental Performance. Gaye's performance of the song later made it into the compilation album, Grammy's Greatest Moments Volume I, in 1994. The American Music Awards recognized the track for Favorite Soul/R&B Single. "Sexual Healing" sold over two million units in its standard 45 RPM single format and was certified platinum by the Recording Industry Association of America. The digital sales of "Sexual Healing" reached 500,000 downloads and was certified as a gold single in 2005. Also issued as a mastertone, this format was certified platinum in 2007.

== Personnel ==
Credits sourced from The Atlantic, Electronic Sound, and the original album liner notes

- Marvin Gaye – lead and backing vocals, Roland Jupiter-8 synthesizers, Fender Rhodes electric piano, Hammond organ, Roland TR-808 programming, finger cymbals
- Gordon Banks – electric guitars, backing vocals
- Harvey Fuqua – backing vocals

== Charts ==
=== Weekly charts ===
Chart (1982–1983)	Peak position
Australia (Kent Music Report)	4
Belgium (Ultratop 50 Flanders)	2
Canada Top Singles (RPM)	1
Finland (Suomen virallinen lista)	12
France (IFOP)	17
Ireland (IRMA)	7
Netherlands (Dutch Top 40)	3
Netherlands (Single Top 100)	3
New Zealand (Recorded Music NZ)	1
Quebec (ADISQ)	1
Sweden (Sverigetopplistan)	17
UK Singles (Official Charts)	4
US Billboard Hot 100	3
US Hot Adult Contemporary Tracks (Billboard)	34
US Hot Black Singles (Billboard)	1
US Hot Dance Club Play (Billboard)	12
US Cash Box Top 100	5
West Germany (GfK)	23

Year	Chart	Rank
2011	France (SNEP)	74
2012	France (SNEP)	187
2013	France (SNEP)	73
2014	France (SNEP)	90
2015	France (SNEP)	68

=== Year-end charts ===
Chart (1982)	Rank
Netherlands (Single Top 100)	55
US Cash Box	44

Chart (1983)	Rank
Australia (Kent Music Report)	31
Belgium (Ultratop 50 Flanders)	72
Canada Top Singles (RPM)	12
New Zealand (RIANZ)	20
US Billboard Hot 100	32
US Hot Black Singles (Billboard)	1
US Cash Box	49

== Certifications ==
Region	Certification	Certified units/sales
Australia (ARIA)	Gold	35,000^{‡}
Canada (Music Canada)	Gold	50,000^{^}
Denmark (IFPI Danmark)	Platinum	90,000^{‡}
Germany (BVMI)	Gold	250,000^{‡}
Italy (FIMI)	Platinum	100,000^{‡}
New Zealand (RMNZ)	4× Platinum	120,000^{‡}
Spain (Promusicae)	Platinum	60,000^{‡}
United Kingdom (BPI) Physical 1982 sales	Silver	250,000^{^}
United Kingdom (BPI) Digital 2004 release	Platinum	600,000^{‡}
United States (RIAA) Mastertone	Platinum	1,000,000^{*}
United States (RIAA) Digital	Gold	500,000^{*}
United States (RIAA) Physical	Platinum	1,000,000^{^}
^{*} Sales figures based on certification alone.^{^} Shipments figures based on certification alone.^{‡} Sales+streaming figures based on certification alone.

== Soul Asylum version ==
"Sexual Healing"

Single by Soul Asylum

from the album No Alternative
- Released: 1993
- Length: 4:45
- Label: Arista
- Songwriters: Marvin Gaye; Odell Brown; David Ritz

"Sexual Healing" was covered in 1993 by Minneapolis rock band Soul Asylum for the charity compilation No Alternative. Despite not being promoted as a single, the song peaked at number 10 on the US Modern Rock Tracks chart. It was included on the compilation Playlist: The Very Best of Soul Asylum.

=== Charts ===
Chart (1993)	Peak position
US Alternative Airplay (Billboard)	10

== Max-A-Million version ==
In 1995, American musical group Max-A-Million covered "Sexual Healing". Their version peaked at number 60 on the US Billboard Hot 100, number five in Australia, number four in New Zealand and number one on the Canadian RPM Dance chart.

=== Charts ===
==== Weekly charts ====
Chart (1995–1996)	Peak position
Australia (ARIA)	5
Canada Top Singles (RPM)	76
Canada Dance/Urban (RPM)	1
Germany (GfK)	59
Iceland (Íslenski Listinn Topp 40)	25
New Zealand (Recorded Music NZ)	4
US Billboard Hot 100	60
US Top 40/Rhythm-Crossover (Billboard)	11
US Cash Box	53

==== Year-end charts ====
Chart (1996)	Position
Australia (ARIA)	17
Canada Dance/Urban (RPM)	23
US Top 40/Rhythm-Crossover (Billboard)	56

=== Certifications ===
Region	Certification	Certified units/sales
Australia (ARIA)	Platinum	70,000^{^}
New Zealand (RMNZ)	Gold	5,000^{*}
^{*} Sales figures based on certification alone.^{^} Shipments figures based on certification alone.

== Sarah Connor version ==
"Sexual Healing"

Single by Sarah Connor featuring Ne-Yo

from the album Soulicious
- B-side: "Get It Right"
- Released: 2007
- Studio: Saal 4 (Berlin, Germany)
- Length: 4:10
- Label: X-Cell
- Songwriters: Marvin Gaye; Odell Brown; David Ritz
- Producers: Kay D.; Rob Tyger

Sarah Connor singles chronology
"The Impossible Dream (The Quest)" (2007)	"Sexual Healing" (2007)	"Under My Skin" (2008)

Ne-Yo singles chronology
"Because of You" (2007)	"Sexual Healing" (2007)

Music video
- "Sexual Healing" on YouTube

In 2007, the song was covered by German singer Sarah Connor for her studio album of covers, Soulicious (2007). A re-recorded version featuring American singer Ne-Yo was released as the album's second single in 2007. On the same album, Connor performed a posthumous duet with Gaye entitled "Your Precious Love".

The song's music video is placed in the story of the 1986 erotic drama film 9½ Weeks, featuring representative scenes from the film, e.g. the well-known ice scene, Connor being fed by a Ne-Yo doppelgänger and her homemade striptease. Apart from the original film, this video is one of the few visual works that repeat the proem to the sex scene on the stairs in the rain. Ne-Yo was not available the day the music video was shot, so a doppelgänger was used. Connor stated that she was slightly drunk during the shoot of the video.

=== Track listing ===
European CD single

1. "Sexual Healing" (video version featuring Ne-Yo) – 3:52
2. "Sexual Healing" (original radio edit) – 3:51

European CD maxi single

1. "Sexual Healing" (video version featuring Ne-Yo) – 3:52
2. "Sexual Healing" (original radio edit) – 3:51
3. "Get It Right" – 4:20
4. "Sexual Healing" (video featuring Ne-Yo) – 4:04
5. Online Access: Making of "Sexual Healing"

=== Charts ===
Chart (2007)	Peak position
Austria (Ö3 Austria Top 40)	45
Europe (Eurochart Hot 100 Singles)	44
Germany (GfK)	11
Lithuania (EHR)	1
Switzerland (Schweizer Hitparade)	41

== Kygo remix ==
"Sexual Healing (Kygo remix)"

Remix by Marvin Gaye and Kygo
- Released: April 27, 2015
- Recorded: 2013
- Genre: Tropical house
- Length: 6:08
- Label: Ultra; Sony
- Songwriters: Marvin Gaye; Odell Brown; David Ritz
- Producer: Kygo

Kygo singles chronology
"Stole the Show" (2015)	"Sexual Healing (Kygo remix)" (2015)	"Nothing Left" (2015)

Audio video
- "Sexual Healing (Kygo remix)" on YouTube

Norwegian DJ and record producer Kygo released a remix of "Sexual Healing" on SoundCloud on 21 November 2013. It was watched millions of times on YouTube.

The track was released as a single on April 27, 2015 by Ultra Music. The remix would later appear on the special-edition 12-inch single issued on Record Store Day 2018.

=== Charts ===
Chart (2015)	Peak position
Belgium (Ultratip Bubbling Under Flanders)	17
Netherlands (Single Top 100)	75
Norway (VG-lista)	23
Sweden (Sverigetopplistan)	57

== Other covers ==
Singer Michael Bolton covered the song for his 1999 album, Timeless: The Classics Vol. 2. His version peaked at number 28 on the US Adult Contemporary chart and at number 48 on the Canadian Adult Contemporary chart.

Kate Bush and Davy Spillane's version of 'Sexual Healing' appeared as a non-album bonus track on her "King of the Mountain" single in 2005.

In 2005, the Hot 8 Brass Band included a cover of the song on their album Rock with the Hot 8 (later re-released on the Tru Thoughts label, in 2007). This version of the song also features prominently in the movie Chef (2014), with the title character (played by Jon Favreau) and his sous-chef (played by John Leguizamo) singing along.

== Remixes, samplings and interpolations ==
In 2001, "Sexual Healing" is interpolated by Joe on the song "Let's Stay Home Tonight".

In 2005, "Sexual Healing" was sampled by Japanese singer-songwriter Miliyah Kato in her song "Dear Lonely Girl". The song charted at number 15 on the Oricon Singles Chart.

In 2007, this song was remixed by Alibi vs. Rockefeller with a music video featuring three female dancers dressed as nurses (Lauren Ridealgh, Bayley Darling, and Stephanie Fitzpatrick). It charted at number 16 on the Finnish Singles Chart and at number 34 on the UK Singles Chart.

In 2017, R&B singer, Miguel, used a sampled portion & interpolations of "Sexual Healing" in the song, "Pineapple Skies", from his 2017 studio album, "War & Leisure".

== Legacy ==
In 2003, Rolling Stone listed "Sexual Healing" at number 231 on its list of the 500 Greatest Songs of All Time. In the follow-up 2011 list, it dropped two places to number 233. In the 2021 list, it was ranked at number 198. Frequently included in best-of lists, the song ranked number 45 on Blender's list of their "Top 500 Songs Since You Were Born". It also ranked in several rock lists in Norway, Spain, the UK and the United States. It was also inducted to the Rock and Roll Hall of Fame as one of the 500 Songs that Shaped Rock and Roll.

== See also ==
- List of number-one R&B singles of 1982 (U.S.)
- List of number-one singles of 1983 (Canada)
- List of number-one singles from the 1980s (New Zealand)
- List of RPM number-one dance singles of 1996

== Bibliography ==
- Gaye, Frankie (2003). Marvin Gaye, My Brother. Backbeat Books. ISBN 0-87930-742-0.
- Ritz, David (1991). Divided Soul: The Life of Marvin Gaye. Cambridge, Mass: Da Capo Press. ISBN 0-306-81191-X.
- Whitburn, Joel (2004). Top R&B/Hip-Hop Singles: 1942–2004. Record Research Incorporated. ISBN 978-0-89820-160-4.
