= Midnight Love =

1982 studio album by Marvin Gaye

Studio album by Marvin Gaye
- Released: November 8, 1982
- Recorded: October 1981 – August 1982
- Studios: Studio Katy (Ohain, Belgium); Devonshire (Los Angeles, California); Kendun Recorders (Burbank, California); Arco (Munich, Germany)
- Genres: Soul; funk; reggae; R&B; boogie
- Length: 39:30
- Label: Columbia
- Producer: Marvin Gaye

Marvin Gaye chronology
In Our Lifetime (1981)	Midnight Love (1982)	Dream of a Lifetime (1985)

Singles from Midnight Love
- 1. "Sexual Healing" Released: October 1982; 2. "My Love Is Waiting" Released: December 1982 (UK); 3. "'Til Tomorrow" Released: February 1983 (US); 4. "Rockin' After Midnight" Released: 1983 (EU); 5. "Joy" Released: March 1983 (UK)

Midnight Love is the sixteenth studio album by American soul singer and songwriter Marvin Gaye and the final album to be released during his lifetime, released on November 8, 1982. He signed with the label Columbia in March 1982 following his exit from Motown.

The disc was certified triple platinum in the United States. It was an immediate international success selling over six million records worldwide. It was nominated for a 1984 Grammy for Best Male R&B Vocal Performance, spawning the two-time Grammy Award-winning hit "Sexual Healing". It was ranked number 37 on the Rolling Stone list of the best albums of the 1980s decade and the NME named the album as its Album of the Year in 1982.

== Background ==
In January 1981, Gaye's final Motown album, In Our Lifetime, was released on Motown's Tamla label. Gaye was angry over its release and Motown's edit of the album, comparing it to an unfinished Picasso painting and having others finish the painting for him. Gaye vowed afterwards never to record for Motown again. The following month, a Belgian concert promoter and a longtime fan of Gaye's music, Freddy Cousaert, visited a visibly shaken and depressed Gaye, who was struggling with drug addiction, in London, following the end of a European tour. Concerned for Gaye's health and state, Cousaert offered Gaye a place in his pension in Ostend. Gaye, who was traveling with his younger brother Frankie and then-girlfriend, Dutch model Eugenie Vis, agreed to go on the trip, though he later admitted to Frankie that he did not know where Ostend was and that he "left that to the hands of God."

Gaye arrived at Ostend on February 14, 1981. Gaye cut down on his drug use while in Ostend and began exercising and attending the local church. He recovered well enough to begin talks of a musical comeback. Disappointed in the results of his last two albums and in his relationship with Motown, as well as disappointing fans during his oft-chaotic concert tours, Gaye, with Cousaert's help, began rehearsing a new band for the short Heavy Love Affair Tour, named after Gaye's song from the In Our Lifetime album in Ostend. Some of the rehearsal footage aired on the Belgian TV documentary Transit Ostend. The tour took place mainly in London, Bristol and Manchester, England, before Gaye performed the final two dates in Ostend. Gaye ended the tour after the Ostend performances and remained in Ostend, along with two of his touring musicians, Gordon Banks and Odell Brown.

Within the final months of 1981, with word of Gaye plotting a musical comeback and an exit from Motown, several labels offered record deals. Gaye eventually accepted CBS Records, which in turn gave him a three-album contract with Columbia. Details of how much Gaye was paid when he signed on March 23, 1982, were not made public due to possible interference with his payment to creditors, which had prompted him to settle in Europe permanently. It was later determined that it took $1.5 million (US$5,004,310 in 2025 dollars) to buy Gaye's contract out of Motown, with an additional $600,000 advance money (US$2,001,724 in 2025 dollars) awarded to the singer. Gaye had begun recording his new album starting in December 1981 in Brussels before the deal was set. Figuring he had alienated record buyers and his legion of fans for writing interpersonal albums, Gaye sought to record more mainstream music to win them back. In explaining why he decided to go for the commercial sounds instead of looking inward as he had with his last album, In Our Lifetime, Gaye said: "I'm worried that I'm getting so introspective, no one will listen. I can't afford to miss this time. I need a hit." In regards to the album's music, Gaye told a reporter:

"On one level, it's a party record. It's a record you can dance to and even freak to. But if you listen closely and go beneath your surface, you'll hear my heart speaking. You'll hear my heart saying, 'It's time to put the madness behind and let love lead the way.' You'll hear me testify that I still believe in Jesus, I still believe in God's miraculous grace, I still believe that the Lord forgives even when—and especially when—we cannot forgive ourselves."

== Recording ==
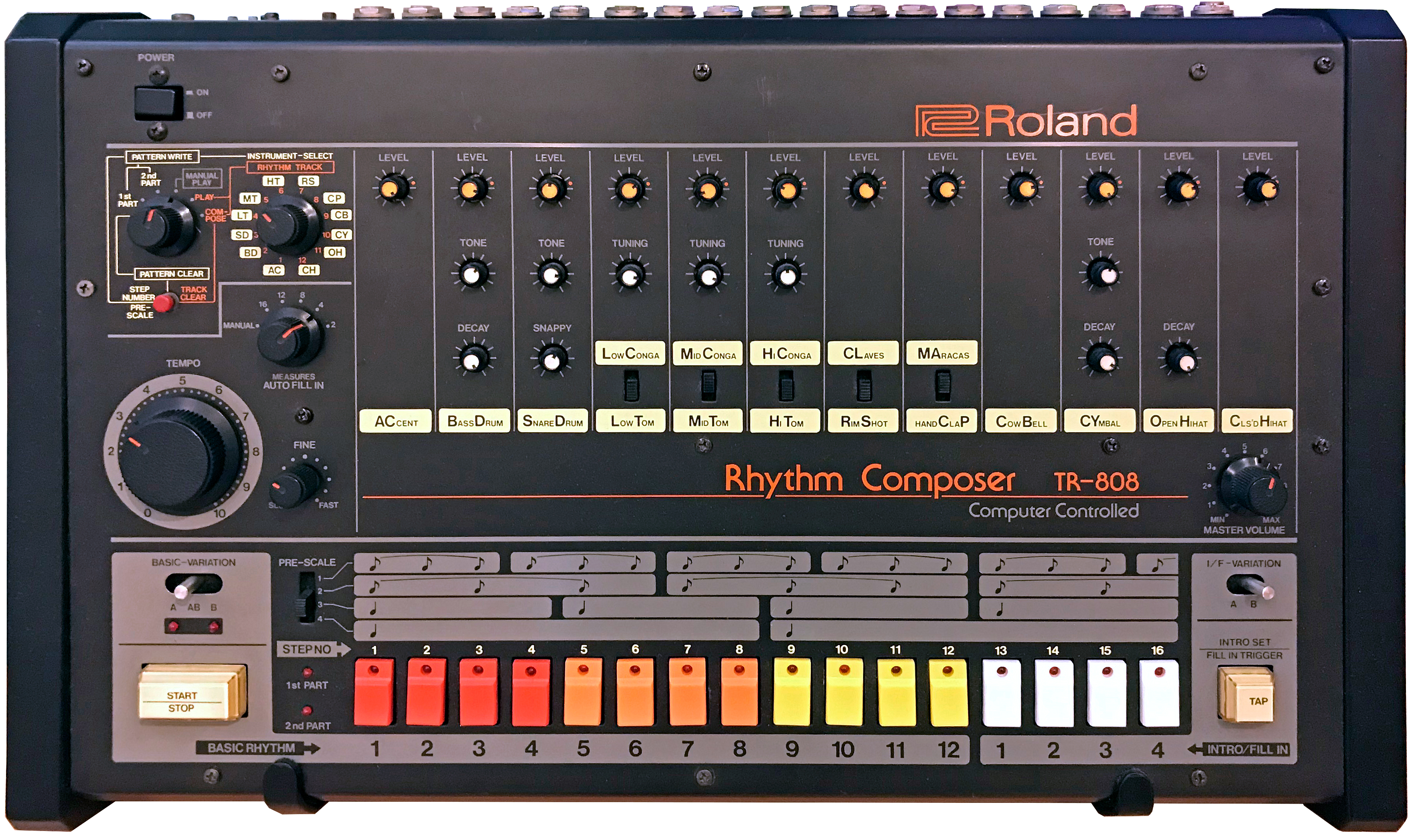
A Roland TR-808 similar to the one Gaye used throughout the recording of Midnight Love.

One of the first songs Gaye had worked on with musician Odell Brown was a reggae-influenced track that Gaye and Brown had recorded around October 1981. The then-Rolling Stone reviewer David Ritz had arrived to Belgium in April 1982 after he had been tipped off about where Gaye was. Despite Gaye's pleas to not meet up with him, Ritz eventually located Gaye in his Ostend apartment not too far from Cousaert's pension, where he and Gaye reluctantly continued their interviews that led to the 1985 book Divided Soul.

According to Ritz, he had seen several S&M comicbook-type publications on Gaye's bookshelf. Said to have been disgusted with this, Ritz told Gaye "you need some sexual healing". Ritz then alleged Gaye told him to write a poem.

When Cousaert was told of this story, he denied Ritz ever having anything to do with the song except for its title. Musicians Odell Brown and Gordon Banks also flatly denied Ritz's accounts, with Brown stating: "I never met the guy. All I was told was that he was doing an interview for Rolling Stone."

Banks stated that what really happened is that Gaye had told Ritz he was intrigued by Amsterdam's Red Light District and Ritz had responded to it by stating Gaye needed sexual healing but "that was it. David didn't have anything to do with that." Gaye's brother Frankie also stated that all Ritz said was "not only are you sexy but your music is healing" after Gaye played the track to him. A reluctant Ritz later sued Gaye for royalties in 1983; by 1988, Gaye's estate had settled the matter out of court and Ritz earned a third of royalties.

Gaye and Gordon Banks then worked on seven of the album's other tracks. To help out, Columbia had sent Gaye and his musicians several instruments along with the Roland TR-808 drum machine and a Jupiter 8 synthesizer. Gaye and Banks mainly contributed to the production, with Harvey Fuqua adding to the production by adding horn sections. With regard to the recording development of the album, Banks stated:

It was basically him and I in the studio. Columbia Records gave him some new toys to play with. They gave him two drum machines, a synthesizer called a Roland TR-808 and a Jupiter 8. Marvin didn't know too much about technology so it was my job to figure out how to get the stuff working. He kind of liked the sounds that came from it and he went from there. Marvin was a great pianist. After getting past the challenges with the Jupiter 8, it was like he had been playing it his whole life.

The funk song "Rockin' After Midnight" actually came about by the mixing of two songs. "My Love Is Waiting", the sole Gordon Banks composition, was recorded much like the demo. Around April 1982, Gaye presented a rough demo of "Sexual Healing" to Columbia executive Larkin Arnold, who was as pleased with the song as Marvin had been. The album took more than nine months to be completed, and was mixed and edited in several studios in Belgium, Germany and the United States, particularly in California. Arnold explained that the production was costly and that Gaye's months in production were sporadic at best. According to Curtis Shaw, Gaye's lawyer, the cost of recording the album was $1.5 million (US$5,004,310 in 2025 dollars), though Arnold put it at "closer to $2 million" (US$6,672,414 in 2025 dollars).

== Composition ==
"Sexual Healing"
Marvin Gaye's "Sexual Healing" from Midnight Love

Midnight Love contains elements of funk, boogie, Caribbean music, reggae, new wave and synthpop, as well as older genres such as soul, R&B and doo-wop. The reason for these many genres was because, according to Banks, Gaye's music was "progressing" and that it was "changing and it had to change because he didn't want any more ties to Motown".

As Larkin Arnold later explained, "Marvin had been living in Europe, and was influenced by both reggae and the synthesizer work of groups like Kraftwerk" and that he "took the rhythm of reggae, the new technology and American soul and came up with something fresh and unique".

"Midnight Lady" starts off with assorted percussion, provided by Gaye and other musicians, before its beat is delivered by a drum machine and overdubbed handclaps provided by the singer, followed by keyboard riffs (also played by Gaye), guitar lines by Banks and a horn section. It is almost two minutes before Gaye began singing the song's first lines. Musically, the song has elements of funk, new wave and synthpop; Gaye's vocals were also influenced by the vocal styling in new wave records. The demo of this recording was listed as "Clique Games/Rick James".

"Sexual Healing" was influenced by Caribbean music and reggae while also including funk elements musically; vocally the song recalls Gaye's gospel background while his background harmonies (which included Fuqua and Banks as co-backing vocalists) took influence from doo-wop.

"Rockin' After Midnight" was also influenced by funk as well as boogie music, while "'Til Tomorrow", the sole quiet storm ballad in the album, was also strongly influenced by doo-wop and smooth soul from Gaye's Let's Get It On era.

The original version of "Turn On Some Music", titled as "I've Got My Music", included some spiritual and autobiographical lyrics, that changed to sexually erotic ones. In addition to the original demo, another alternate version mixed both versions.

The reggae-inspired "Third World Girl" is a tribute to Bob Marley, though Gaye refused to mention Marley by name on the track, explaining, "I won't exploit a leader to make a commercial song". The gospel-influenced "Joy" is a tribute to his father's ministry and his own religious background. The song also includes a rock-influenced guitar solo from Banks. "My Love Is Waiting" has elements of funk, synthpop and gospel music, as evident to Gaye's final words in his thank you calls, "we like to thank our Heavenly Father, Jesus!" The entire album's length is just under 40 minutes.

A controversial outtake from the album sessions, "Sanctified Lady" was originally planned and expected by the singer to become a follow-up to the success of Sexual Healing. Another controversial outtake is a song titled "Masochistic Beauty". Originally incomplete during the times of the album's release and Gaye's death, both songs were later completed by Gordon Banks and released on the posthumous Dream of a Lifetime compilation.

== Critical reception ==
Professional ratings
Review scores
Source	Rating
AllMusic	4/5 stars
Christgau's Record Guide: The '80s	A−
MusicHound R&B	4/5 stars
Rolling Stone	4/5 stars
The Rolling Stone Album Guide	4/5 stars
The Village Voice	A

In his review of Midnight Love, Rolling Stone reviewer Dave Marsh called the album in terms of it being viewed as a comeback as "remarkably arrogant", stating "it simply picks up from 1973's Let's Get It On as if only ten minutes had elapsed since Gaye hit his commercial peak", though he did state the album was a successful comeback. After its rank on the magazine's list of best eighties albums, the album was described as "an inspired, mature work from one of the greatest soul singers, and is certainly one of the best solo albums of the eighties."

Village Voice critic Robert Christgau explained that the album's "concentration on the carnal is one reason it's his best ever". Mike Freedberg of The Boston Phoenix said "There's not a trace of old Motown in the best of Midnight Love, and more's the power." In its Picks and Pans Reviews, People cited "too long gone, the Soulful One shows he can still sizzle". At the 1984 Grammy Awards, the album was nominated for a Best Male R&B Vocal Performance Grammy, losing out to Michael Jackson's "Billie Jean". "Sexual Healing" won two Grammys the previous year, the only two Gaye won in his lifetime.

Midnight Love was voted the eighth best album of 1982 in The Village Voice's annual Pazz & Jop critics poll. A similar placement was ranked on the Netherlands' Oorlijsten. The UK's NME listed it at number-one on its list. Since then, much like Gaye's previous albums, it has been listed on best-of lists, ranking at number 37 on the United States and Australia Rolling Stone list of top eighties albums. The UK magazine Melody Maker listed it as one of the significant albums to be released between 1982 and 1985. Gary Mulholland listed it as one of the "261 Greatest Albums Since Punk and Disco" in 2006.

== Commercial performance ==
Midnight Love was released to record retail stores on November 8, 1982, in the US and on November 12 in the UK. In response to "Sexual Healing", the album was bought out in droves. By that December, the album had already hit No. 1 on the Top Black Albums chart and the Top 10 of the Pop albums chart, making it Gaye's eighth album to accomplish this. "Sexual Healing" crossed over to No. 3 on the Billboard Hot 100. By the end of 1982, it had already sold over a million copies.

Upon Gaye's return to the United States, Gaye attended a party in celebration of the album's accomplishment with a new polished look, reuniting with his ex- Anna Gordy Gaye and their son, Marvin III. Worldwide, the album also performed extremely well, hitting No. 1 in Canada and No. 7 in the United Kingdom. The album's biggest hit single, "Sexual Healing", sold over two million US copies and earned an RIAA Platinum certification. It hit the top of the charts in several countries and stayed at No. 1 on the Top Black Singles chart for ten consecutive weeks, making it the most successful R&B single of the 1980s.

== Impact ==
The album made an impact on future R&B recordings. The Isley Brothers, who released their album, Between the Sheets, in April 1983, took the same musical approach of Midnight Love and added it to their album. Gordon Banks stated the album "influenced a lot of people doing a mellow thing with a funk vibe in it". Because the album was also among the first pop albums to use a Roland TR-808, the style would be copied by other artists of similar genres in the years to come. In the wake of its success, "Sexual Healing" became one of Gaye's most covered songs as well as being sampled by several artists in the hip-hop and R&B genres. The demo version of "Turn On Some Music" was sampled for Erick Sermon's hit, "Music", giving full credit to Gaye as a leading vocalist, giving Gaye a posthumous top-40 hit in 2001, 17 years after his death. In 1998, Sony Music re-released the album as a two-CD "Legacy" edition set titled Midnight Love and the Sexual Healing Sessions. The same edition would be re-released in 2007, to celebrate the album's 25th anniversary since its release.

== Track listing ==
=== Original release ===
All tracks composed by Marvin Gaye, except where noted.

Side one
No.	Title	Music	Length
1.	"Midnight Lady"		5:17
2.	"Sexual Healing"	Odell Brown, Gaye, David Ritz	4:05
3.	"Rockin' After Midnight"		6:04
4.	"'Til Tomorrow"		4:57

Side two
No.	Title	Music	Length
1.	"Turn On Some Music"		5:08
2.	"Third World Girl"		4:36
3.	"Joy"		4:22
4.	"My Love Is Waiting"	Gordon Banks	5:07

2000 CD reissue bonus track
No.	Title	Length
9.	"Rockin' After Midnight" (Instrumental)	7:00

=== The Sexual Healing Sessions ===
1998 CD reissue bonus disc (The Sexual Healing Sessions)
No.	Title	Length
1.	"Clique Games/Rick James" (Original version of "Midnight Lady")	5:38
2.	"Sexual Healing" (Alternate 12-inch instrumental)	4:38
3.	"Sexual Healing" (Acappella)	4:39
4.	"Sexual Healing" (Alternate vocal/mix)	4:49
5.	"I Bet You Wonder" (Original version of "Rockin' After Midnight")	6:42
6.	"Rockin' After Midnight" (Instrumental)	7:00
7.	"Baby, Baby, Baby" (Acappella)	6:54
8.	"I've Got My Music" (Acappella)	5:33
9.	"Turn On Some Music" (Alternate vocal/mix)	5:16
10.	"Third World Girl" (Original reggae version)	8:00
11.	"Third World Girl" (Alternate Vocal/mix)	6:34
12.	"My Love Is Waiting" (Alternate vocal/mix)	5:15
13.	"Marvin's Message to the CBS Records Staff"	1:01
14.	"Sexual Healing" (Rehearsal Tape Courtesy of David Ritz)	2:14

- Like the 2000 CD reissue of the album, the 2002 Super Audio CD (SACD) reissue includes an instrumental version of "Rockin' After Midnight" as a bonus track. However, the latter release notes that the version present on the 2000 reissue, referred to as the "Instrumental Stereo Mix", is distinct from the version on the 2002 reissue, which was newly mixed in 5.1 surround sound for said release by engineer and producer Jimmy Douglass.

== Personnel ==
- Marvin Gaye – vocals, Fender Rhodes piano, Roland Jupiter-8 synthesizer, organ, drums, TR-808 drum machine, Synclavier II, Yamaha CS-80, drum programming, bells, glockenspiel, vibraphone, finger cymbals, bongos, congas, cabasas
- Gordon Banks – guitar, bass, backing vocals, drums, Fender Rhodes piano
- James Gadson – drums on "Midnight Lady"
- Andy Richards - Synclavier programming
- Bobby Stern – tenor saxophone, harmonica
- Joel Peskin – alto and tenor saxophone
- Harvey Fuqua – backing vocals on "Sexual Healing", editing, mixing, production advisor
- David Stout and The L.A. Horn Section – horns
- Curt Sletten – trumpet
- Harry Kim – trumpet
- Alan Kaplan – trombone
- McKinley T. Jackson – horn arrangement

Technical

- Larkin Arnold – executive producer
- Mike Butcher – engineer, mixing
- Brian Gardner, Alan Zentz – mastering
- John Kovarek – engineer
- Henri Van Durme – engineer

== Charts ==
=== Weekly charts ===
Weekly chart performance for Midnight Love
Chart (1982)	Peak position
Australian Albums (Kent Music Report)	23
Canada Top Albums/CDs (RPM)	7
Dutch Albums (Album Top 100)	8
German Albums (Offizielle Top 100)	20
New Zealand Albums (RMNZ)	6
Swedish Albums (Sverigetopplistan)	14
UK Albums (Official Charts)	10
US Billboard 200	7
US Top R&B/Hip-Hop Albums (Billboard)	1

=== Year-end charts ===
1983 year-end chart performance for Midnight Love
Chart (1983)	Position
German Albums (Offizielle Top 100)	70
US Billboard 200	45
US Top R&B/Hip-Hop Albums (Billboard)	2

== Certifications ==
Certifications for Midnight Love
Region	Certification	Certified units/sales
France (SNEP)	Gold	100,000^{*}
United Kingdom (BPI)	Gold	100,000^{^}
United States (RIAA)	3× Platinum	3,000,000^{^}
^{*} Sales figures based on certification alone.^{^} Shipments figures based on certification alone.

== Sources ==
- Des Barres, Pamela (1996). Rock Bottom: Dark Moments in Music Babylon. Macmillan. ISBN 0-312-14853-4.
- Gaye, Frankie (2003). Marvin Gaye, My. Backbeat Books. ISBN 0-87930-742-0.
- "Marvin Gaye: From Misery to Ostend". Humo. March 14, 1994.
- Ritz, David (1991). Divided Soul: The Life of Marvin Gaye. Cambridge, Mass: Da Capo Press. ISBN 0-306-81191-X.
- Ritz, David (2007). Midnight Love and the Sexual Healing Sessions.
