= Romantically Yours =

Studio album by Marvin Gaye
- Released: November 1985
- Genres: R&B, soul, vocal jazz
- Length: 33:22
- Label: Columbia
- Producers: Marvin Gaye, Harvey Fuqua

Marvin Gaye chronology
Dream of a Lifetime (1985)	Romantically Yours (1985)	Motown Remembers Marvin Gaye: Never Before Released Masters (1986)

Singles from Romantically Yours
- 1. "Just Like" Released: 1985

Romantically Yours is the second posthumous release by American recording artist Marvin Gaye, released by Columbia Records in 1985.

== Background ==
When Marvin Gaye was killed in April 1984, he still had two albums left to complete on his contract with Columbia Records. In May 1985, Columbia issued the album, Dream of a Lifetime, which performed modestly on the chart. A little over six months later, Columbia assembled tracks from Gaye's Motown period, mostly of traditional pop and vocal jazz tunes that Gaye had recorded in the 1960s and 1970s and named it "Romantically Yours".

== Recording ==
Starting in 1968, Gaye had begun working on a pop vocal album with producer and arranger Bobby Scott. Among the songs they recorded were "Why Did I Choose You", "More", "Maria", "Fly Me To The Moon" and "I Won't Cry Anymore". Midway through recording, Gaye, depressed over personal issues and upset over his career, stopped recording sessions with Scott and wouldn't revisit the work with Scott for over a decade.

During the 1970s, Gaye revisited the studio and composed songs over a jazz setting, including "Just Like", "Walkin' in the Rain" and "Stranger in My Life". The song "I Live For You" was originally recorded during sessions for Let's Get It On. Having revisited his Scott productions in the late 1970s, Gaye recorded several different versions of the song "The Shadow of Your Smile". In the version featured on Romantically Yours, Gaye sings in both tenor and falsetto. In addition to these songs, a song composed in the early 1960s by Eddie Holland and Norman Whitfield, "Happy Go Lucky", was also included.

Most of the songs were reworked by Harvey Fuqua, who took credit for producing the album. The album was released in November 1985, intended for Gaye's fans, rather than for commercial assumption, which was the case of In Our Lifetime. With the release of Romantically Yours, Columbia completed Gaye's contract. In 1997, several of the songs featured in a different sound culled from the 1979 sessions of an album titled The Ballads, were included in the Motown compilation, Vulnerable.

Professional ratings
Review scores
Source	Rating
AllMusic	3/5 stars
Robert Christgau	C+

== Track listing ==
1. "More" (Norman Newell, Nino Oliviero, Riz Ortolani) – 2:40
2. "Why Did I Choose You" (Michael Leonard, Herbert Martin) – 2:36
3. "Maria" (Leonard Bernstein, Stephen Sondheim) – 3:06
4. "The Shadow of Your Smile" (Johnny Mandel, Paul Francis Webster) – 3:03
5. "Fly Me to the Moon" (Bart Howard) – 3:19
6. "I Won't Cry Anymore" (Al Frisch, Fred Wise) – 2:40
7. "Just Like" (Gaye) – 4:08
8. "Walkin' in the Rain" (Gaye) – 2:54
9. "I Live for You" (Gaye) – 2:40
10. "Stranger in My Life" (Gaye) – 3:41
11. "Happy Go Lucky" (Eddie Holland, Norman Whitfield) – 2:35
