= In Our Lifetime (Marvin Gaye album) =

Studio album by Marvin Gaye
- Released: January 15, 1981
- Recorded: 1979–1980
- Studios: Marvin's Room (Los Angeles): Seawest Recording (Honolulu); Odyssey (London)
- Genres: Soul; funk; jazz
- Length: 41:30
- Label: Tamla
- Producer: Marvin Gaye

Marvin Gaye chronology
Here, My Dear (1978)	In Our Lifetime (1981)	Midnight Love (1982)

Singles from In Our Lifetime
- 1. "Ego Tripping Out" Released: September 28, 1979; 2. "Praise" Released: February 6, 1981; 3. "Heavy Love Affair" Released: April 20, 1981

In Our Lifetime is the fifteenth studio album by the American soul singer and songwriter Marvin Gaye, released January 15, 1981, on Motown label Tamla Records. Recording sessions for the album took place at Marvin's Room in Los Angeles, California, Seawest Recording Studio in Honolulu, Hawaii, and at Odyssey Studios in London, England, throughout 1979 and 1980 (and abruptly remixed in 1981 by Motown). The album cover was designed by Neil Breeden. Gaye's final album for Motown before leaving for Columbia Records, the album was the follow-up to the commercial failure of Here, My Dear, a double album which chronicled the singer's divorce from Anna Gordy. Entirely written, produced, arranged, and mixed by Gaye, In Our Lifetime was a departure for Gaye from the disco stylings of his previous two studio efforts and was seen as one of the best albums of the singer's late Motown period.

== Conception ==
In 1979, Marvin Gaye found himself at a professional and personal low ebb. Two years without a hit since "Got to Give It Up", he had released the commercially unsuccessful Here, My Dear, which then alienated critics and fans alike for the musician's take on his personal life including his troubling marriage to Anna Gordy, which had ended in divorce a couple years before. Following that divorce, Gaye married his longtime girlfriend Janis in October 1977. Janis Gaye later filed for legal separation citing mental abuse throughout their marriage. Janis had been the inspiration behind Gaye's 1976 album, I Want You. That year, Gaye decided to reestablish his pop audience, and later released a slightly autobiographical 1979 disco song he titled "Ego Tripping Out" in which he lyrically explained his larger-than-life ego and masked it with personal doubt and his desire to change his ways ("turn the fear into energy/'cause the toot and the smoke won't fulfill the need"). Gaye debuted the song while appearing on Dinah Shore's Dinah & Friends, with the performance later being featured on the DVD, Marvin Gaye - The Real Thing: In Performance 1964-1981.

Test pressing artwork for the cancelled release of Love Man.

The song was supposed to be the leading track off Gaye's next album, a disco-styled album he titled Love Man, with tracks he had recorded at his recording studio complex. However, the album was put on hold as Gaye, now facing a $4.5 million debt with the IRS, went out on a half-hearted world tour to alleviate his debts. Midway through after a mildly receptive show in Japan and performances in Hawaii, he abandoned the tour, which led to musicians in his band as well as concert promoters suing Gaye for thousands of dollars on reneging on the contract. For weeks, Gaye secluded himself in a bread van on the beach in Maui while still struggling from his now-crippling cocaine addiction. However, desperate for a fix, he called his mother Alberta and asked her to give away earrings he had bought her in exchange for money to buy cocaine. He had also gone so far to ask friends such as Smokey Robinson and Stevie Wonder for money, but neither complied. Around this time, Gaye's lawyer advised him to file for voluntary bankruptcy, later resulting in the shutdown of his recording studio, which further depressed Gaye.

An ill-fated reunion with Janis around this time led Gaye, high on cocaine and mushrooms, to point a knife to Janis's heart, causing another separation. Around this time, Gaye tried finishing his Love Man album but instead of presenting the album with upbeat lyrics, some of the songs dealt with his own life. In the song, "Dance 'N Be Happy", for example, while the chorus repeated "let's dance and be happy", the lyrics, which Marvin sung off the top of his head in falsetto, revealed his anguish at the fallout of his marriage to Janis, even accusing her of making him "uptight". After hearing a mix in Honolulu, a disillusioned Gaye shelved the album, fearing his music career was over. One day, severely depressed, Gaye ingested a full ounce of cocaine, in his first suicide attempt since the late 1960s, thinking he would die. He later told David Ritz, "I'd given up. The problems were too big for me. I just wanted to be left alone and blow my brains on high-octane toot. It would be a slow but relatively pleasant death, certainly less messy than a gun." During this time, British concert promoter Jeffrey Krueger got contact with Gaye through drug dealers. Krueger, with help from Gaye's friend Jewel Price, convinced Gaye to sober up and start a European tour, Gaye's first since 1976. The tour, which took place in 1980, featured performances in Germany, Austria, France, Italy, Switzerland, The Netherlands and England. The tour ended on a bad note after Gaye failed to show up on time for a command performance for Princess Margaret, leaving Krueger to sue him for breach of contract; eventually, Gaye and Krueger settled their dispute without having to go to trial.

Gaye, now scared of a possible arrest warrant for avoiding the IRS, decided to settle in London where he partook on the city's nightlife and suffered a relapse. By now, Gaye had learned of freebasing while living in London and would spend weeks getting high. Gaye also began to reevaluate the Love Man album stating "I had to do something for money, but I also had an obligation—to the truth. Motown wasn't giving me a cent 'cause they were yelling how they'd spent a fortune on the Love Man cover and here I was holed up in Hawaii telling them the love man was dead. He was. The love man was me and I needed to stop that shit." Gaye rethought the album's concept and said he "saw how silly I'd been. Who needed another record moanin' and bitchin' 'bout some woman? Why did I have to regain my throne as the sex king? Who cared about competing with Michael Jackson and Prince? Look what was happening with the world. I had a message to spread. I had my theme."

== Recording ==
The first recording sessions for the album took place at Marvin Gaye Studios in Hollywood and then at Honolulu's Seawest Recording Studios. Upon arriving in London in 1980 where he settled, Gaye recorded his new concept for the album at London's Odyssey and George Martin's AIR Studios. Songs that Gaye had recorded while in Los Angeles and Hawaii changed from their original approach. The original version of "Love Party" was titled "Dance 'N Be Happy" and mainly focused on his fallout of his marriage to Janis Gaye, only to be rewritten as a pseudo dance song with gospel-influenced lyrics. The blues song, "Just Because You're So Pretty" transformed into "Love Me Now or Love Me Later", which focused on the concept of "good and evil" souls that Gaye felt existed inside human beings, mainly himself. The funk song, "I Offer You Nothing But Love", was transformed into "In Our Lifetime", which included chants from one of Gaye's musicians ("come let's all get funky if you dig the right/come let's all get funky if you dig the wrong"), with the lyrics talking about a possible Armageddon approaching. The mild disco sound of "Lover's Plea" again was altered for more gospel influences in the song "Praise", even praising Stevie Wonder for the inspired riff for the song ("Stevie, we really dig you/hope you don't mind this riff from you"). "Life is For Learning" didn't change from the original song much except for the song's original title with the singer focusing on how he approached his music ("the artist pays the price/so you won't have to pay/if we would listen to what he has to say"). "Funk Me" was altered from the more sexually charged version from Love Man (its original title chanted "funk me" three times) and "Heavy Love Affair", his one song in which he discusses his fallout with Janis, was originally "Life's a Game of Give and Take", ironically doing the reverse of his other songs in which the original song discussed personal issues with his own life and flipping them around to focus on his fallout with Janis. "Far Cry" was the only newer song from the sessions in London to be featured along with the instrumental "Nuclear Juice". Gaye also revived and reworked "Ego Tripping Out" twice as a possible entry into the album, before ultimately omitting the song from the final album tracklist.

By late December, Gaye had finished the rough draft of the album and later revised the album in a concept album format adding in synthesizer sounds to segue each song into the next, a style he had originally done with albums such as What's Going On, Let's Get It On and I Want You. However, around this time, one of Marvin's touring and recording musicians, bassist Frank Blair, decided to take the contents of the album's master tapes to Motown's Hollywood offices, which was done unbeknownst to Gaye, who was remixing and editing the album in Odyssey Studios in London. Motown, still angered over Gaye's backing away from the Love Man project, revised the album for several weeks.

== Release ==
Professional ratings
Review scores
Source	Rating
AllMusic	4/5 stars
BBC	(favorable)
Chicago Tribune	3/4 stars
Christgau's Record Guide: The '80s	A−
Tom Hull	B+
The New York Times	(favourable)
Record Mirror	3.5/5 stars

When In Our Lifetime was finally issued in recording stores on January 15, 1981, Gaye was angry over its rush release. He later said, "How could they embarrass me like that? I was humiliated. They also added guitar licks and bass lines. (The former happened with "Heavy Love Affair".) How dare they second guess my artistic decisions? Can you imagine saying to an artist, say Picasso, 'Okay Pablo, you've been fooling with this picture long enough. We'll take this unfinished canvas and add a leg here, an arm there. You might be the artist, but you're behind schedule, so we'll finish this painting for you. If you don't like the results, Pablo, baby, that's tough!' I was heartbroken. I was deeply hurt. Motown went behind my back. That's something I'll never forgive or forget." Upon hearing it, he said the label had re-edited the album without his permission. However, sales for the album were low, despite its critical success, producing a sole R&B hit with "Praise" and peaking at number 32 on the Billboard Top 200, but hitting number six on the Billboard R&B albums chart. After its release, Gaye asked to be let go from his contract.

Gaye's request was finally granted after CBS Records' urban division president Larkin Arnold bought him out of his Motown contract, thus ending the singer's 22-year relationship with the company in 1982 (Gaye then eventually recorded his final album to be released during his lifetime, Midnight Love, in Belgium and Germany).

The album was re-released by Motown on compact disc in 1994 to coincide with the tenth anniversary of Gaye's death, including the song "Ego Tripping Out" as part of the track listing.

On June 19, 2007, 26 years after the album's release, Hip-O Records re-released the album as an expanded edition, which included not only the album as originally released but also alternate takes from London's Air and Odyssey Studio sessions, the original 1979 single of "Ego Tripping Out", as well as an alternate cut from In Our Lifetime sessions.

In Our Lifetime? was incorrectly titled In Our Lifetime (omitting the question mark at the end) from the time of its release until Motown corrected it starting in 2007.

The second disc released what was from the Love Man sessions with instrumental productions that were included in Lifetime under different lyrics and different titles. The reissue restored Gaye's intended question mark at the end of the title and was limited to 5,000 copies.

== Track listing ==
All tracks were written, arranged, composed and produced by Marvin Gaye.

=== Original 1981 release ===
Side A

1. "Praise" – 4:51
2. "Life Is for Learning" – 3:39
3. "Love Party" – 4:58
4. "Funk Me" – 5:34

Side B

1. "Far Cry" – 4:28
2. "Love Me Now or Love Me Later" – 4:59
3. "Heavy Love Affair" – 3:45
4. "In Our Lifetime" – 6:57
- NOTE: The 1994 re-release adds an alternate version of "Ego Tripping Out" (7:16) exclusive to this edition as track one.

=== Expanded edition ===
Disc one (bonus tracks)

1. "Nuclear Juice" (Air Studios Mix Outtakes) – 5:46
2. "Ego Tripping Out" (Air Studios Mix Outtakes) – 4:55
3. "Far Cry" (Air Studios Mix Outtakes) – 6:21
4. "Ego Tripping Out" (Love Man: The Single) – 5:13
5. "Ego Tripping Out – Instrumental" (Love Man: The Single) – 3:43

Disc two

1. "Praise" (Odyssey Studios Mix) – 5:09
2. "Life Is For Learning" (Odyssey Studios Mix) – 3:53
3. "Heavy Love Affair" (Odyssey Studios Mix) – 4:40
4. "Love Me Now or Love Me Later" (Odyssey Studios Mix) – 5:43
5. "Ego Tripping Out" (Odyssey Studios Mix) – 4:37
6. "Funk Me" (Odyssey Studios Mix) – 5:13
7. "In Our Lifetime" (Odyssey Studios Mix) – 5:51
8. "Love Party" (Odyssey Studios Mix) – 5:18
9. "Life's a Game of Give and Take" (The Love Man Sessions) – 4:57
10. "Life Is Now in Session" (The Love Man Sessions) – 4:04
11. "I Offer You Nothing But Love" (The Love Man Sessions) – 6:03
12. "Just Because You're So Pretty" (The Love Man Sessions) – 5:06
13. "Dance 'N' Be Happy" (The Love Man Sessions) – 6:49
14. "Funk Me, Funk Me, Funk Me" (The Love Man Sessions) – 5:49
15. "A Lover's Plea" (The Love Man Sessions) – 6:10

== Personnel ==
- Marvin Gaye – vocals, keyboards, drums
- Robert Ahwry – guitar
- Gordon Banks – guitar
- Frank Bates – bass, background vocals
- Frank Blair – bass, drums
- Candace Bond – Executive Producer
- Jon Walls – Recording & Mix Engineer
- Ray Brown – trumpet
- William Bryant – drums, keyboards
- Elmira Collins – vibraphone, background vocals
- Raymond Crossley – keyboards
- Fernando Harkness – saxophone
- Joe James – percussion
- Gary Jones – percussion, conga
- Lee Kentle – drums, background vocals
- Nigel Martinez – drums
- Kenny Mason – trumpet
- Joe Mayo – percussion
- Sidney Muldrew – French horn
- Curtis Anthony Nolen – guitar
- Raphael Ravenscroft – alto saxophone
- Dr. George Shaw – trumpet
- Nolan Andrew Smith – trumpet
- David Ritz – liner notes
- Preston "Bugsy" Wilcox – drums
- Ron Slenzak – photography

== Charts ==
=== Weekly charts ===
Year	Chart	Position
1981	Pop Albums	32
1981	Black Albums	6

=== Singles ===
Year	Title	Chart	Position
1981	"Heavy Love Affair"	Black Singles	61
1981	"Praise"	Black Singles	18

== Sources ==
- Des Barres, Pamela (1996). Rock Bottom: Dark Moments in Music Babylon. Macmillan. ISBN 0-312-14853-4.
- Ritz, David (1991). Divided Soul: The Life of Marvin Gaye. Cambridge, Mass: Da Capo Press. ISBN 0-306-81191-X.
