= Here, My Dear =

Studio album by Marvin Gaye
- Released: December 15, 1978
- Recorded: March 24, 1977 – July 9, 1978
- Studios: Marvin's Room, Los Angeles, California
- Genres: Soul; funk
- Length: 71:51
- Label: Tamla
- Producer: Marvin Gaye

Marvin Gaye chronology
Live at the London Palladium (1977)	Here, My Dear (1978)	In Our Lifetime (1981)

Singles from Here, My Dear
- 1. "A Funky Space Reincarnation" Released: February 11, 1979; 2. "Anger" Released: August 9, 1979 March, 1988 (re-release)

Here, My Dear is the fourteenth studio album by the American soul singer and songwriter Marvin Gaye, released as a double album on December 15, 1978, on Motown-subsidiary label Tamla Records. Recording sessions for the album took place between 1977 and 1978 at Gaye's personal studios, Marvin Gaye Studios, in Los Angeles, California. It is a concept album, notable for its subject matter focusing largely on Gaye's acrimonious divorce from his first wife, Anna Gordy Gaye.

A commercial and critical failure upon its release, it was later hailed by music critics in the years following Gaye's death as one of his best albums, and was placed at number 493 on Rolling Stone's "500 Greatest Albums of All Time" list in 2020.

== Background ==
Marvin Gaye was going through a personal crisis in the summer of 1976. In November 1975, Gaye's estranged first wife, Anna Gordy Gaye, sued Gaye for divorce, claiming irreconcilable differences, and sought child support for their adopted son, Marvin Gaye III. Gaye later argued his spending habits were causing him to fall behind on payments. In September 1976, a warrant was issued for Gaye's arrest after he failed to pay alimony; this made him feel vulnerable during the recording sessions, causing the singer to hide from the public for several days.

Several weeks later, Gaye accepted an offer to do a tour of Europe. Between October and December 1976, Gaye performed in the United Kingdom, France, the Netherlands and Germany. Following his return, he recorded "Got to Give It Up" and released it on his album, Live at the London Palladium. The song became an international hit, reaching number one on the Billboard Hot 100.

After months of delays, in March 1977, the singer's attorney, Curtis Shaw, wanted to end divorce proceedings and convinced Gaye to give up half of the percentage of album royalties he would earn from his next Motown album to Anna. The Gayes' divorce was finalized later that month.

== Recording ==
When Gaye was set to start production on the record, he said he figured he would just do a "quickie record—nothing heavy, nothing even good", stating, "Why should I break my neck when Anna was going to wind up with the money anyway?" But as Gaye lived with the notion of doing an album for his soon-to-be ex-wife, the more it fascinated him, stating he felt he "owed the public my best effort." Gaye stated he did the record "out of deep passion", noting he "sang and sang until I drained myself of everything I'd lived through."

Shortly after the deal was made, Gaye entered his recording studio on March 24, 1977, to record the album with only engineer Art Stewart by his side. Gaye, who usually did not write his lyrics, composed on the spot, mumbling over prerecorded tracks or to his own accompaniment. The mumblings were "embryonic melodies", which eventually evolved into lyrics after three or four takes. Gaye ended up playing all the keyboard parts of the album, saying later, "I didn't plan it that way. It just turned out to be a hands-on project."

== Music ==
According to PopMatters journalist Mike Joseph, Here, My Dear's music was "largely midtempo funk, with elements of traditional soul, gospel, and doo-wop mixed together with a slight hint of disco". The title track opens the album, and in the album's liner notes David Ritz describes Gaye's tone in the song as "self-serving, self-justifying [and] self-pitying". "I Met a Little Girl" includes doo-wop drenched harmonies with its lyrics and music producing a "thick mixture" of sincerity and sarcasm. Considered the central melodic motif of the album, "When Did You Stop Loving Me, When Did I Stop Loving You" abandoned traditional song structure with a discursive mode, without a chorus, with its lyrics expressing "different feelings - tenderness, fear, anger, regret". Described as "straight ahead and beguiling" compared to all the other songs on the album, "Anger" is considered as "part sermon and part self-retribution", describing his movement from catharsis to escape.

"Is That Enough?" was recorded shortly after Gaye returned from a day in divorce court, humming the song's melody and some lyrics. Much like some other songs, it's told in a storyteller's point of view. "Everybody Needs Love" is described as an "attempt to empathy". "Time to Get It Together" includes a confessional that was influenced by Stevie Wonder's song, "As". "Anna's Song" is described as "the very heart" of the album. "A Funky Space Reincarnation" alluded to Star Wars as well as the music of George Clinton's Parliament-Funkadelic. "You Can Leave, But It's Going to Cost You" is produced under an assertive tone describing an argument between Marvin and his wife over his girlfriend, Janis. The final track, "Falling in Love Again", is dedicated to Janis, in which Gaye concluded on a "regenerative note".

An AllMusic reviewer later wrote of the music:

...the sound of divorce on record—exposed in all of its tender-nerve glory for the world to consume... Gaye viciously cuts with every lyric deeper into an explanation of why the relationship died the way it did... Musically the album retains the high standards Gaye set in the early '70s, but you can hear the agonizing strain of recent events in his voice, to the point where even several vocal overdubs can't save his delivery.

— AllMusic

== Artwork ==
The front cover featured a painting of Gaye dressed in a toga in a neo-Roman setting, created by artist Michael Bryan, who stated Gaye described how he wanted to be depicted on the cover. The back cover features a temple with the word "matrimony" collapsing around a mock-Rodin sculpture of a romantic couple. The fold-out illustration inside the original double album shows a man's hand reaching across to the hand of a woman's, about to give her a record. The hands are extended on a Monopoly board—with the legend JUDGMENT written on it. On the man's side are tape recorders and a grand piano; on the woman's are a house, car and ring. The scales of justice sit above the game while, from arched windows, curious observers watch. David Ritz described the juxtaposition of images reflected Gaye's turbulent state of mind at the time.

== Release and reception ==
Professional ratings
Review scores
Source	Rating
AllMusic	4.5/5 stars
Chicago Tribune	3.5/4 stars
The Guardian	4/5 stars
Mojo	4/5 stars
Pitchfork	8.7/10
PopMatters	9/10
Q	4/5 stars
The Rolling Stone Album Guide	3.5/5 stars
Uncut	5/5 stars
The Village Voice	B+

When Here, My Dear was released in the end of 1978, it received mostly positive reviews and modest sales, with critics calling the album "bizarre" and "un-commercial." The album's lack of success angered Gaye to the point that he refused to promote it any further. Motown stopped promoting Here, My Dear in early 1979, by which point Gaye had gone into self-imposed exile. Around the same time, Gaye's relationship with his second wife, Janis, had also fallen apart and the couple separated sometime in 1979. Upon hearing the album, a visibly upset Anna Gordy considered suing Gaye for invasion of privacy but, according to People, later reconsidered that decision. The album peaked at number four R&B and number 26 pop, becoming Gaye's lowest-charting studio album of the 1970s. Initial response to the album was mixed, as most critics described it as weird. However, Gaye's lyrical honesty over the laid back disco grooves of Here, My Dear was praised by many. Robert Christgau, of The Village Voice, wrote of the album:

...this is a fascinating, playable album. Its confessional ranges from naked poetry ("Somebody tell me please/Why do I have to pay attorney fees?" is a modernist trope that ranks with any of Elvis Costello's) to rank jive, because Gaye's self-involvement is so open and unmediated, guileless even at its most insincere, it retains unusual documentary charm. And within the sweet, quiet, seductive sound. Gaye is at such pains to realize, his rhythmic undulations and whisper-to-a-scream timbral shifts can engross the mind, the body, and above all the ear. Definitely a weird one.

The Bay State Banner noted that "Gaye really did a fine job of arranging the horn charts, keeping them actively involved without dominating or clashing." The New York Times opined that much of the album "is simply brilliant," and wrote that "it is an inventory of the whole expressive range of black popular music at the end of the 70's, a testing of limits, and an affirmation of musical values."

=== Retrospect ===
Soul music doesn't get any deep, darker,
or more personal than this.

— David Ritz, liner note essay, 2008

The album was re-evaluated in the years following its original release, and is today seen as a landmark in Gaye's career. In 1994, the album was re-released due to increased attention on Gaye's life to commemorate the tenth anniversary of his death and reached number one on Billboard's R&B catalog chart.

Here, My Dear was voted one of the greatest albums in music history by Mojo (1995). The album has appeared on all three editions of Rolling Stone's "The 500 Greatest Albums of All Time" list, at No. 462 in 2003, No. 456 in 2012, and No. 493 in 2020.

On February 15, 2008, Hip-O Select reissued Here, My Dear as a two-disc Expanded Edition including a song cut from the original album, "Ain't It Funny How Things Turn Around", which was remixed by funk legend Bootsy Collins. Disc two featured remastered and alternate versions of the songs from the album remixed by contemporary soul producers such as Salaam Remi, Questlove, Prince Paul, DJ Smash, Mocean Worker, and others.

"It doesn't quite get you the first time," Jay Kay told Q. "And a lot of the songs are quite similarly paced. It's almost like the same song being subtly changed ten different ways. A lot of it, lyrically, is about the break-up of his relationship. There's a track called 'Anger', which is lyrically really brilliant; and there's a track called 'Time To Get It Together' using, I think, a marimba, and it's just dreamy and lovely. He was a deep man at the time, but I think the charlie was eating him up. It's all about struggling and fighting, and you can feel it."

Anna Gordy stated in later years that "It's taken me a while, but I've come to appreciate every form of Marvin's music."

== Track listing ==
All songs written by Marvin Gaye, except where noted.

Side one

1. "Here, My Dear" – 2:48
2. "I Met a Little Girl" – 4:58
3. "When Did You Stop Loving Me, When Did I Stop Loving You" – 6:11
4. "Anger" (Delta Ashby, Gaye, Ed Townsend) – 3:58

Side two

1. "Is That Enough" – 7:42
2. "Everybody Needs Love" (Ed Townsend, Gaye) – 5:41
3. "Time to Get It Together" – 3:51

Side three

1. "Sparrow" (Ed Townsend, Gaye) – 6:06
2. "Anna's Song" – 5:49
3. "When Did You Stop Loving Me, When Did I Stop Loving You" (Instrumental) – 5:59

Side four

1. "A Funky Space Reincarnation" – 8:12
2. "You Can Leave, But It's Going to Cost You" – 5:27
3. "Falling in Love Again" – 4:36
4. "When Did You Stop Loving Me, When Did I Stop Loving You (Reprise)" – 0:40

=== 2007 expanded edition ===
Bonus material for the 2007 Hip-O Select Expanded Edition, with first disc of the original album with bonus tracks and second disc of recordings from the sessions for Here, My Dear.

Disc one (bonus track)

15. "Ain't It Funny (How Things Turn Around)" alternate mix – 4:04
  - Mix produced by Bootsy Collins

Disc two (Hear, My Dear sessions 1976–78)

1. "Here, My Dear" alternate mix – 2:50
  - Mix produced and engineered by Mocean Worker
2. "I Met a Little Girl" alternate version – 5:04
  - Mix produced by Easy Mo Bee
3. "When Did You Stop Loving Me, When Did I Stop Loving You" alternate version – 6:57
  - Mix produced by Leon Ware and Gerry "The Gov" Brown
4. "Anger" alternate extended mix – 5:53
  - Mix produced by Marcus Miller
5. "Is That Enough?" (Instrumental) alternate version – 4:06
  - Mix produced by Montez Payton
6. "Everybody Needs Love" alternate version – 6:09
  - Mix produced and engineered by Prince Paul
7. "Time to Get It Together" alternate extended mix – 6:20
  - Remix by Wayne "DJ Smash" Hunter
8. "Sparrow" alternate version – 6:08
  - Mixed and engineered by the Randy Watson Experience
9. "Anna's Song" (Instrumental) alternate version – 6:08
  - Mix produced and engineered by John Rhone from the Whole 9
10. "A Funky Space Reincarnation" alternate extended mix – 9:10
  - Mix produced by John Morales and Paul Simpson
11. "You Can Leave, But It's Going to Cost You" alternate extended mix – 6:43
  - Mix produced and engineered by John Rhone from the Whole 9
12. "Falling in Love Again" alternate version – 6:26
  - ReMix produced by salaamremi.com
13. "A Funky Space Reincarnation" (Instrumental) (Original 12-Inch) – 8:19

== Chart history ==
=== Album ===
Year	Chart	Position
1979	Pop Albums	26
1979	Black Albums	4

=== Singles ===
Year	Title	Chart	Position
1979	"A Funky Space Reincarnation"	Black Singles	23

== Personnel ==
- Marvin Gaye – vocals, piano, Rhodes, Roland bass, synth and horns; tape box percussion, drums

Additional musicians

- Charles Owens – tenor saxophone
- Wali Ali – guitar
- Gordon Banks – guitar
- Spencer Bean – guitar ("Time to Get It Together")
- Cal Green – guitar ("Sparrow")
- Frank Blair – bass
- Eric Ward – bass ("Sparrow")
- Elmira Collins – percussion
- Ernie Fields, Jr. – alto saxophone
- Fernando Harkless – tenor saxophone ("When Did You Stop Loving Me...", "Time to Get It Together")
- Gary Jones – congas
- Nolan Andrew Smith – trumpet
- Bugsy Wilcox – drums
- Melvin Webb – drums, congas, cowbell ("When Did You Stop Loving Me...", "Time to Get It Together")
- Eddie "Bongo" Brown – congas, bongos ("A Funky Space")
- Jack Ashford – percussion ("Ain't It Funny")
- Odell Brown – RMI
- Daniel LeMelle – saxophone ("A Funky Space" 12 inch instrumental overdubs)
- Mike McGloiry – guitar ("A Funky Space" 12 inch instrumental overdubs)
- David Stewart – handclaps (on "A Funky Space")
- Richard "Do Dirty" Bethune – handclaps (on "A Funky Space")
- Art Stewart – handclaps (on "A Funky Space")

Technical

- Marvin Gaye – producer, arranger
- Art Stewart – engineer, mixing
- Fred Ross – engineer
- Tony Houston – engineer
- Bill Ravencraft – engineer
- Jack Andrews – mastering
- Curtis M. Shaw – liner notes
- David Ritz – liner notes (reissue)
- Michael Bryant – cover illustrations
- Kosh – design, art direction

"Special thanks to all the musicians who are too numerous to mention but who are all superstars!"
