= Gordon Banks (musician) =

American guitarist and songwriter (1965–2023)

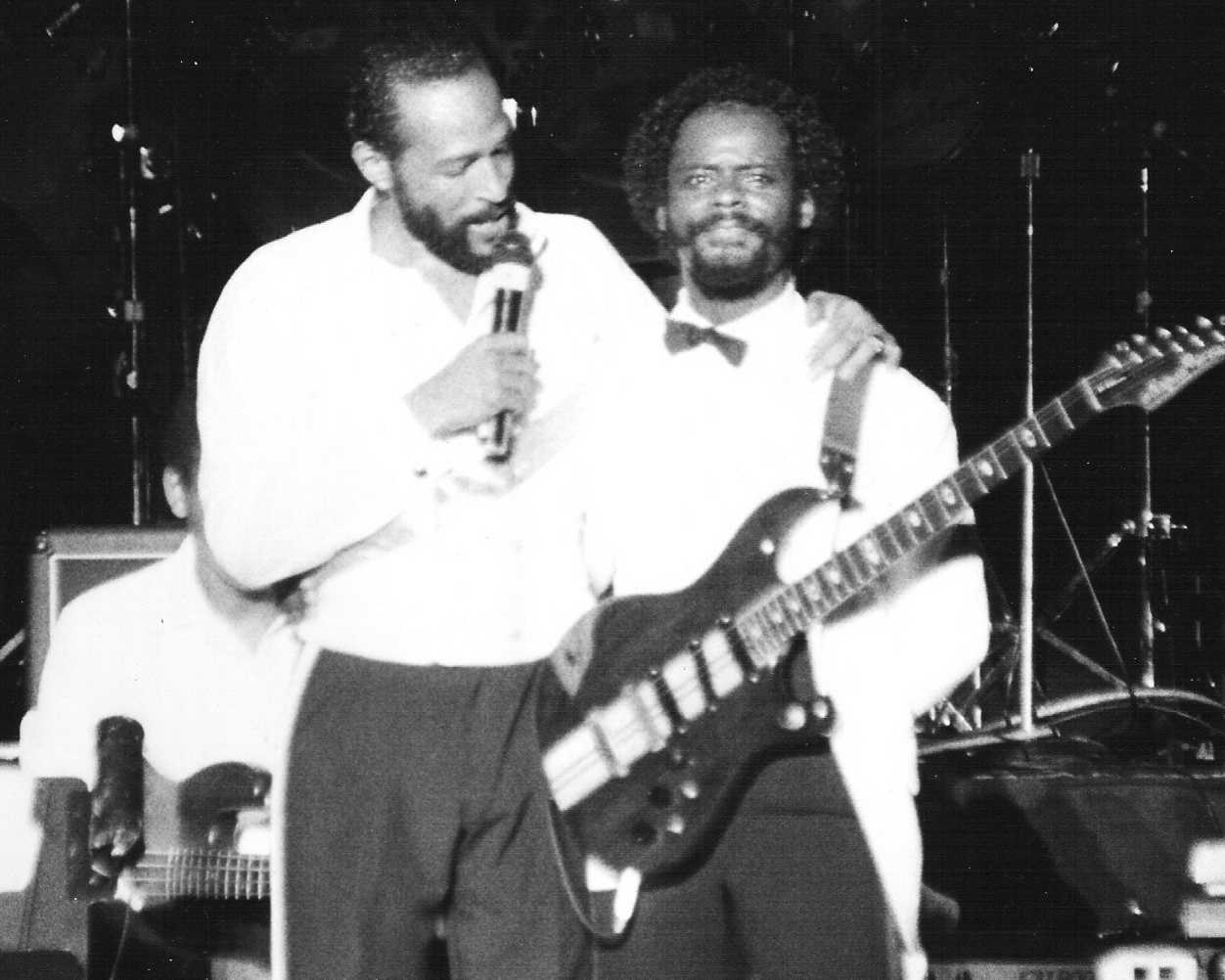
Gordon Banks and Marvin Gaye

Gordon Banks (February 22, 1955 – July 21, 2023) was an American guitarist, producer, writer, and musical director. He was voted one of the top 100 guitarists in America by Rolling Stone magazine in 1985.

Banks played an important part in Marvin Gaye's later years, appearing on all of Gaye's official albums from 1978-1985, including Gaye's hit 1977 single "Got To Give It Up". Gaye referred to him as "ID" meaning "The Indicator".

== Biography ==
=== Early life and career ===
Banks was born on February 22, 1955, in Norfolk, Virginia. Adept at playing instruments at an early age, he joined his first band, The Showmen, at the age of twelve playing guitar. The group, was created by later Chairmen of the Board leader General Norman Johnson. The group was noted for their minor hit single, "39-31-40 Shape". Banks would soon leave the band and Norfolk following his graduation at Norfolk State University, moving to Los Angeles where he landed gigs playing guitar for funk groups such as The Gap Band, New Birth, The Unifics, and Mandrill, gospel musician Edwin Hawkins and Motown superstar Stevie Wonder.

=== Work with Marvin Gaye ===
Banks first got acquainted with Marvin Gaye in 1976. After a year, Banks joined Gaye's band. After first working with Gaye with the funk hit, "Got to Give It Up" and playing guitar with Gaye on his 1977 U.S. tour, Banks helped in directing the music for Gaye's 1978 album, Here, My Dear. Their musical partnership grew and Banks was soon performing all over the world with Gaye as his musical director and guitarist.

In 1980, Banks became Gaye's brother-in-law when he married Gaye's sister Zeola.

Banks was one of the few in Gaye's revolving door of backup musicians to continue to accompany him even as several musicians would leave, some later suing Gaye for failing to pay them money for earnings during the tour. Banks contributed on Gaye's final Motown album, In Our Lifetime, and was the musical director of Gaye's acclaimed 1980 European tour. In 1981, when Gaye moved to Belgium as a tax exile, Banks relocated to Ostend where Gaye was staying with musical promoter Freddy Couseart. Banks helped out on Gaye's short "Heavy Love Affair" European tour that year and after the tour, helped in creating music for what turned out to be Gaye's final album in his lifetime, Midnight Love. In regards to the recording development of the album Banks stated:

"It was basically him and I in the studio. Columbia Records gave him some new toys to play with. They gave him two drum machines, a synthesizer called a Roland TR-808 and a Jupiter 8. Marvin didn't know too much about technology so it was my job to figure out how to get the stuff working. He kind of liked the sounds that came from it and he went from there. Marvin was a great pianist. After getting past the challenges with the Jupiter 8, it was like he had been playing it his whole life."

Released in 1982, Midnight Love became the biggest-selling album of Gaye's career, and its parent single, "Sexual Healing", became a smash hit. Banks contributed to the song singing background and playing rhythm guitar. Banks wrote the tune, "My Love is Waiting", for another group but when the group failed to show up for a recording session, he rewrote the song for Gaye to record. While "Sexual Healing" was a huge hit in the UK, Marvin's label CBS, released "My Love is Waiting" as a promotional single. Boost of the song sent it to number thirty-four on the UK charts. Banks again was the musical director of Gaye's final concert tour in 1983.

Following Gaye's death in 1984, Banks finished production on a posthumous album, 1985's Dream of a Lifetime, which included unfinished recordings Gaye had done between 1971 and 1982. Among the 1982 recordings included leftover Midnight Love tracks such as "Sanctified Lady", which was essentially a demo, with Harvey Fuqua adding in background vocalists, and Banks adding in electro-funk influences. Banks produced another unfinished Midnight Love track, "Masochistic Beauty", which was a biographical account of Gaye's penchant for S&M. Banks played vocoder background vocals on the track. Banks also finished production on a 1978 demo, "Savage in the Sack," a track that was recorded as a joke-on-the-fly. David Ritz later contended that Gaye wouldn't have wanted the songs to be released but due to CBS looking to finish the singer's unfinished contractual obligations, they were put out to help in royalties for the singer's estate.

== Later work ==
Banks was a Media Specialist in Virginia Beach, Virginia, and a collector of unreleased recordings by Marvin Gaye.

== Death ==
Gordon Banks died on July 21, 2023, at the age of 68.

== Discography ==
- 1977: Marvin Gaye - Got To Give It Up (non-album single)
- 1978: Marvin Gaye - Here, My Dear
- 1979: New Birth - Platinum City
- 1979: Penitentiary (film)
- 1980: Marvin Gaye - Marvin Gaye: Live in Montreux 1980
- 1981: High Inergy - High Inergy
- 1981: Marvin Gaye - In Our Lifetime
- 1981: Marvin Gaye - Live In Ostend
- 1981: Edwin Hawkins - Edwin Hawkins Live
- 1982: Marvin Gaye - Midnight Love
- 1982: Edwin Hawkins - Edwin Hawkins Live Vol II
- 1982: Penitentiary II
- 1983: Gladys Knight & the Pips - Marvin Gaye
- 1983: Mona Lisa Young - Knife
- 1983: Marvin Gaye - NBA all star game National Anthem
- 1984: Phyllis St James - Ain't No Turning Back
- 1985: Eddie Murphy - How Could It Be
- 1985: Krystol - Talk Of The Town
- 1985: Marvin Gaye - Dream of a Lifetime
- 1986: Marvin Gaye - Romantically Yours
- 1991: Barry White - Put Me In Your Mix
- 2001: Erick Sermon - Music
