= Ohain, Belgium =

Coordinates: 50°42′N 4°28′E

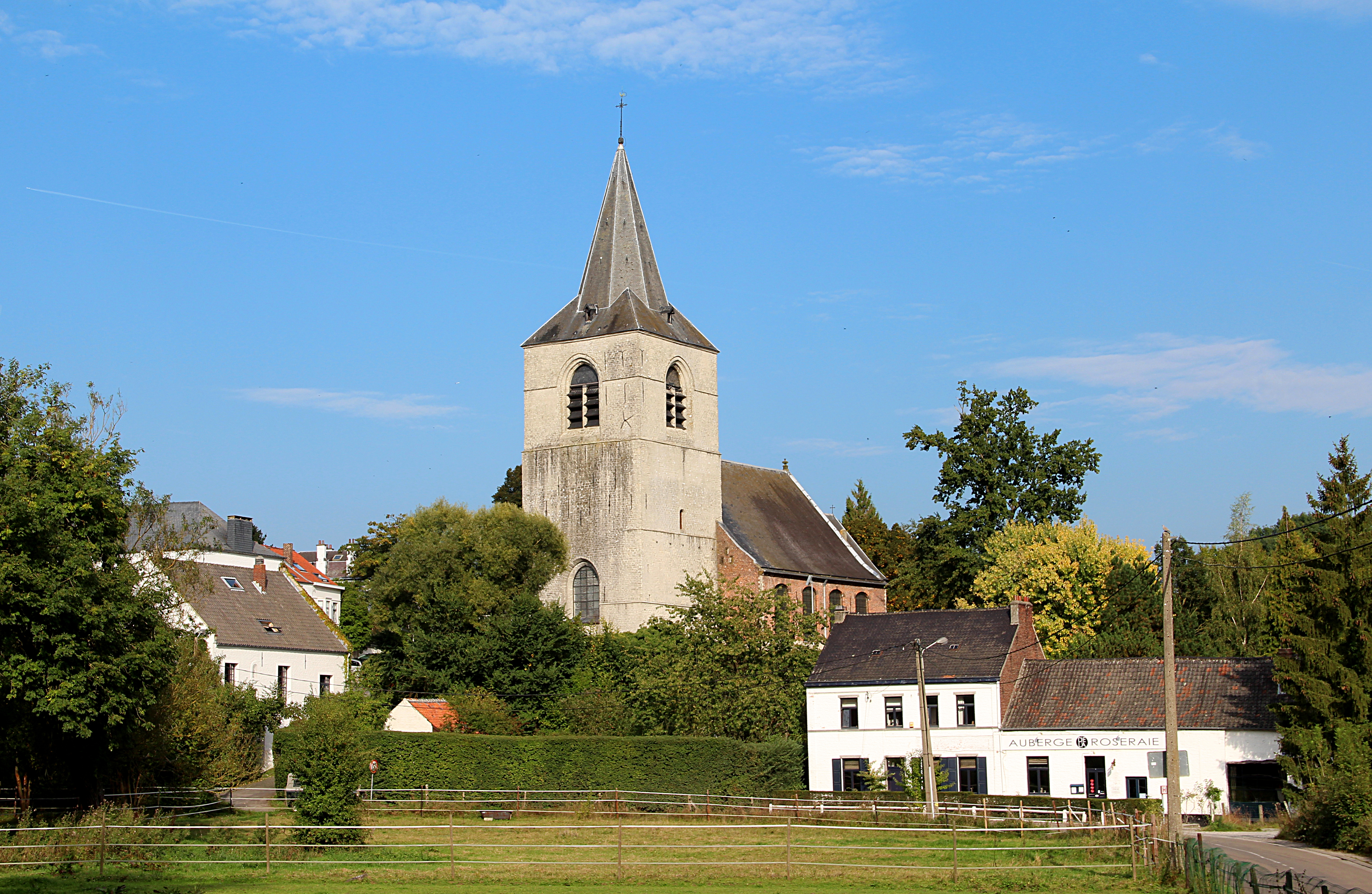
Neighbourhood of the Saint-Etienne church

Ohain (French pronunciation: [ɔ.ɛ̃]; Walloon: Ohin, Middle Dutch:Olhem) is a Belgian village and district of the municipality of Lasne, Wallonia in the province of Walloon Brabant.

== History ==
In the Middle Ages, the village of Ohain was part of a seigneury of the Duchy of Brabant. Duke Jean II transferred the seigneury to a vassal around 1300, and in the 15th century, it became the property of Jean Hinckaert, bastard of Brabant, whose heirs resided here until the castle burned down in the 16th century. The château underwent several alterations in the 18th and 19th centuries, and the village boasts a former communal house dating from 1827. During the World War II, this house hosted secret meetings of politicians and trade unionists.

== In popular culture ==
Two of the most famous songs of the 20th century were recorded in Ohain :

- Born to Be Alive by Patrick Hernandez (1979)
- Sexual Healing by Marvin Gaye (1982), who recorded his Midnight Love album at Studio Katy in Ohain.

== Gallery ==
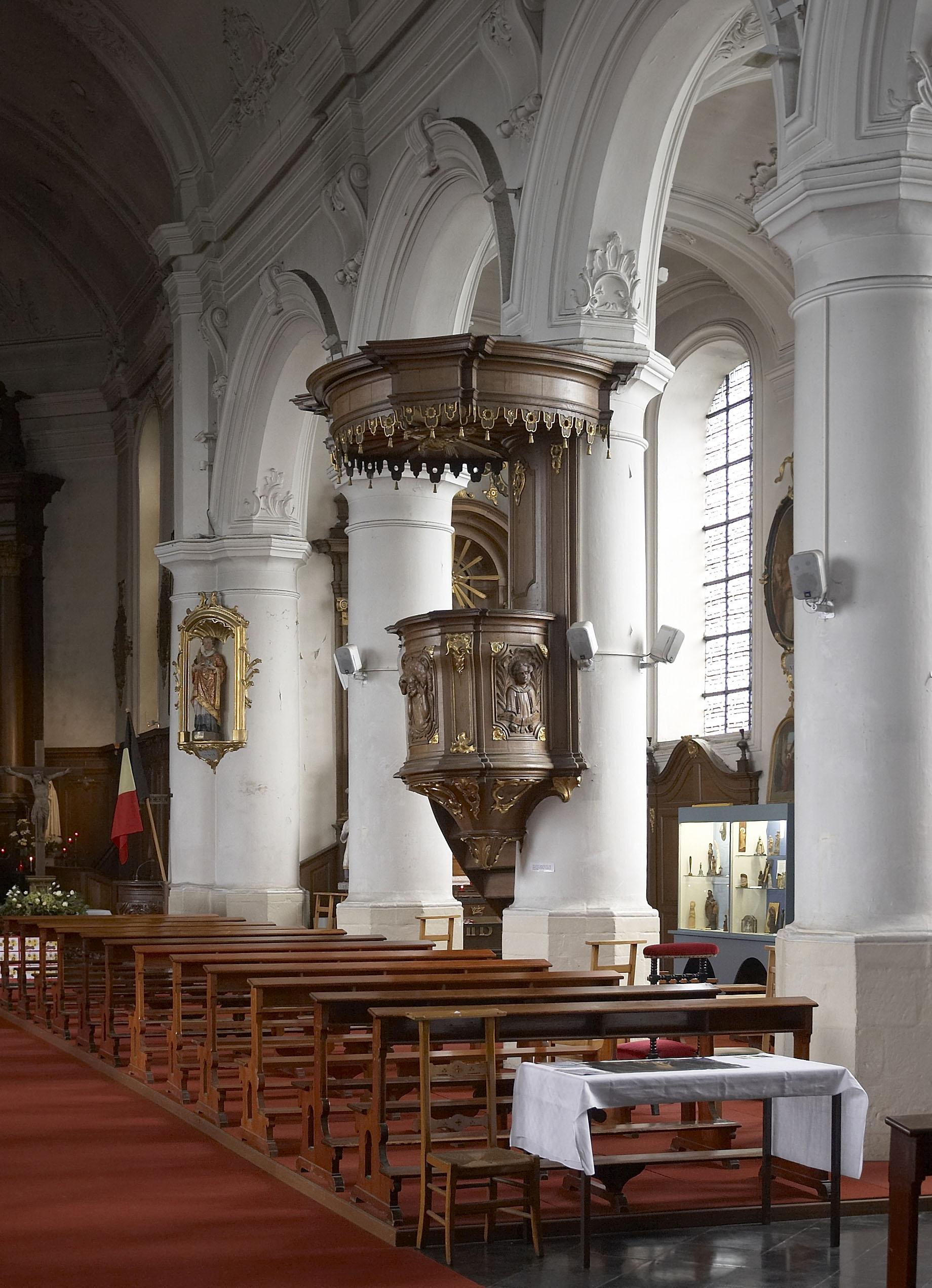
Pulpit of the church of Saint-Etienne

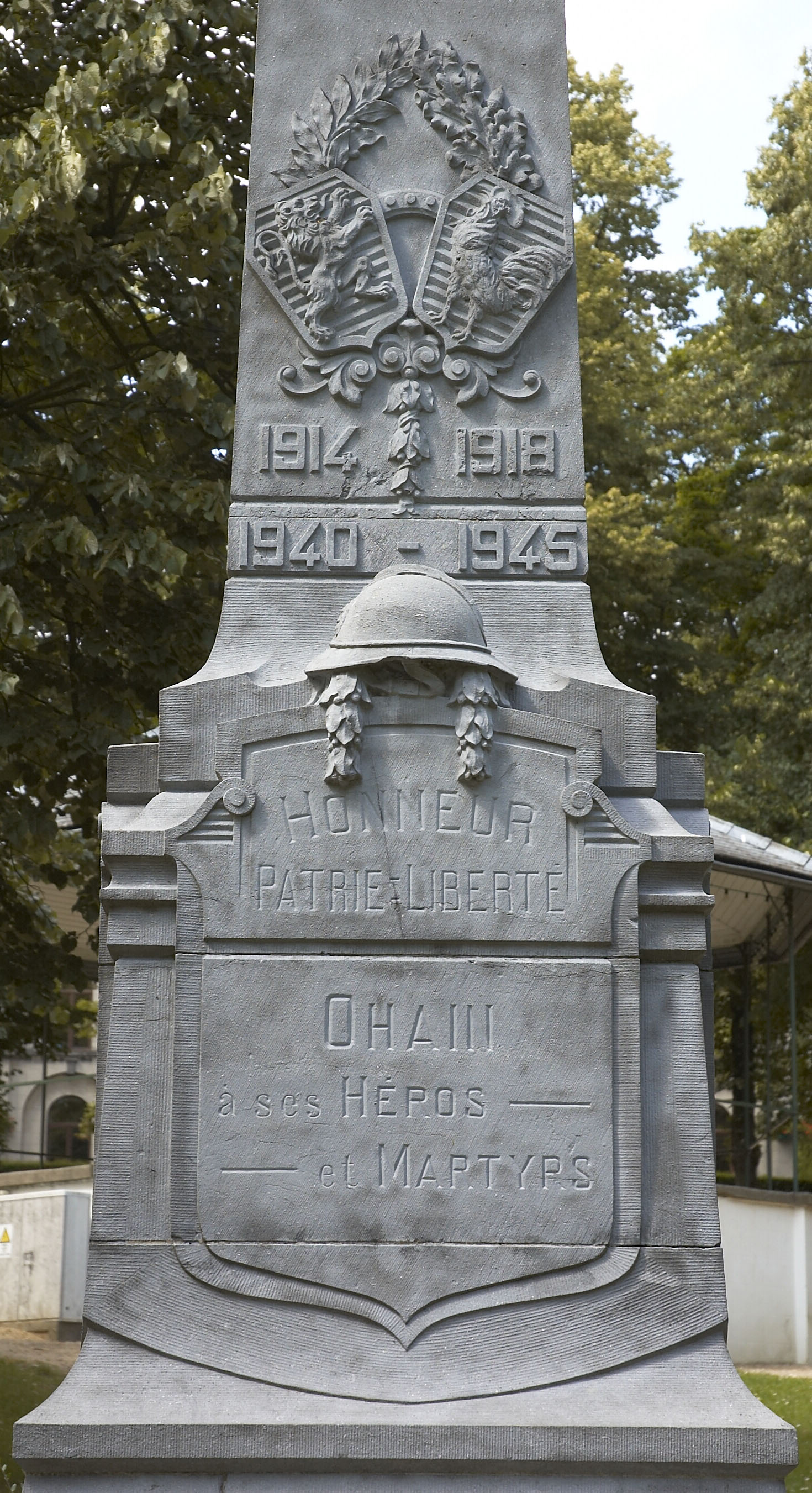
War monument

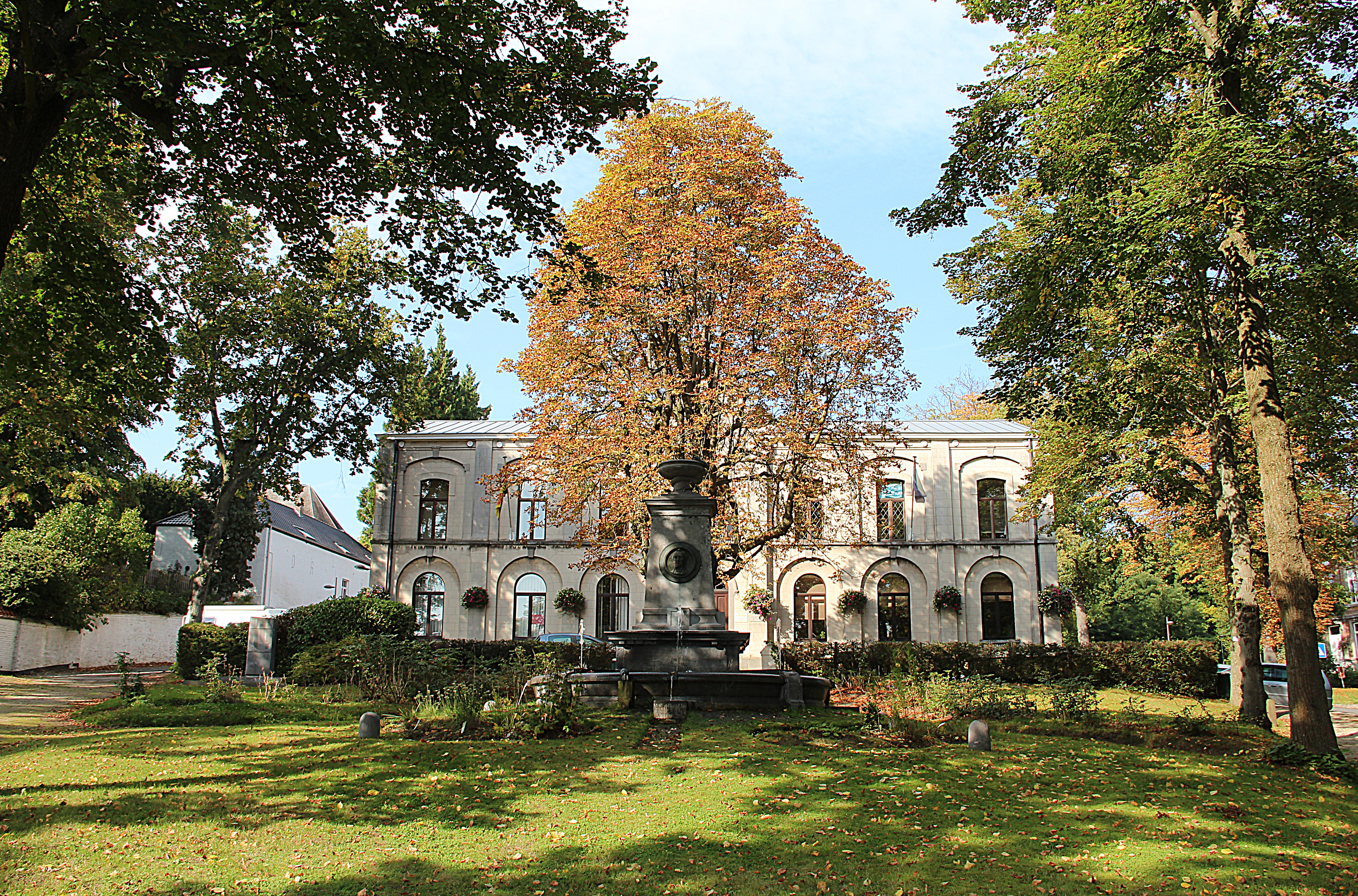
Place Communale
