= Marvin Gaye's Greatest Hits =

Greatest hits album by Marvin Gaye
- Released: 14 September 1976 (LP); 1 January 1987 (CD)
- Recorded: 1963–1976
- Genres: R&B, soul
- Length: 37:34
- Label: Motown
- Producers: Marvin Gaye, Brian Holland, Lamont Dozier, Norman Whitfield, Leon Ware

Marvin Gaye chronology
I Want You (1976)	Marvin Gaye's Greatest Hits (1976)	The Best of Marvin Gaye (1976)

Professional ratings
Review scores
Source	Rating
Christgau's Record Guide	B−

Marvin Gaye's Greatest Hits is a compilation album released by American R&B/soul singer and Motown legend Marvin Gaye, released on the Motown label in 1976 on LP and 1987 on CD. The hits collection, with the exception of Gaye's signature 1960s hits "Can I Get a Witness", "How Sweet It Is (To Be Loved By You)" and "I Heard It Through the Grapevine", was a review of Gaye's signature 1970s hits including the socially conscious anthems "What's Going On" and "Mercy Mercy Me (The Ecology)", erotically focused material like "Let's Get It On", "I Want You" and "After the Dance", his bluesy and funky autobiographical "Trouble Man" and the live version of his quiet storm classic, "Distant Lover". The album has received a Gold as well as a Platinum Certification by the RIAA in 1993.

== Track listing ==
No.	Title	Writer(s)	Original album	Length
1.	"Let's Get It On"	Marvin Gaye; Ed Townsend	Let's Get It On (1973)	4:02
2.	"I Want You"	Leon Ware; Arthur "T-Boy" Ross	I Want You (1976)	3:58
3.	"How Sweet It Is (To Be Loved by You)"	Eddie Holland; Lamont Dozier; Brian Holland	How Sweet It Is to Be Loved by You (1965)	2:59
4.	"I Heard It Through the Grapevine"	Barrett Strong; Norman Whitfield	I Heard It Through the Grapevine (1968)	3:17
5.	"Mercy Mercy Me (The Ecology)"	Marvin Gaye	What's Going On (1971)	3:15
6.	"What's Going On"	Marvin Gaye; Al Cleveland; Renaldo Benson	What's Going On	3:53
7.	"After the Dance"	Marvin Gaye; Leon Ware	I Want You (1976)	3:30
8.	"Can I Get a Witness"	Eddie Holland; Lamont Dozier; Brian Holland	Non-album single (1963)	2:50
9.	"Trouble Man"	Marvin Gaye	Trouble Man (1972)	3:51
10.	"Distant Lover" (Live)	Marvin Gaye; Gwen Gordy Fuqua; Sandra Greene	Marvin Gaye Live! (1974)	5:59
Total length:				37:34

== Certifications ==
Region	Certification	Certified units/sales
United States (RIAA)	Platinum	1,000,000^{^}
^{^} Shipments figures based on certification alone.
