= Musical Massage =

Studio album by Leon Ware
- Released: September 1976
- Recorded: August 22, 1975 – July 1976
- Studio: Motown Recording Studios; Hollywood, California
- Genre: Soul; funk; R&B
- Label: Gordy
- Producer: Leon Ware; Hal Davis

Leon Ware chronology
Leon Ware (1972)	Musical Massage (1976)	Inside Is Love (1979)

Professional ratings
Review scores
Source	Rating
AllMusic	4.5/5 stars

Musical Massage is an album by Leon Ware released in 1976. This was his second solo album and his only release for Motown's Gordy Records subsidy.

== Background ==
By 1975, Ware was signed to Motown as a solo artist. He started working on demos for his next album as well as to win a record deal for T-Boy Ross. One of the demo recordings, "I Want You", was heard by Berry Gordy, who decided the song would be a good fit for Marvin Gaye. Gaye heard the other demos Ware had worked on and decided to record much of it for what would be his next album, I Want You. Buoyed by the number-one title track, that album peaked at number-one on the Soul charts and reached the top ten of the Billboard 200 and sold over a million copies.

Having given away the material for his album, Ware had no choice but to compose an entirely new set of songs. The result would be Ware's second album, Musical Massage, produced primarily by Ware, with Hal Davis producing three tracks ("Instant Love", "Body Heat", and "Share Your Love"). Musical Massage picks up right where Gaye's I Want You leaves off, utilizing some of the same musicians.

== Legacy and influence ==
Following the release of I Want You, Ware released Musical Massage in September 1976. The album failed to chart and was not properly promoted by Motown. Despite this, Musical Massage has become a cult hit among soul music fans who were intrigued by I Want You and songs from that album's producer. Critical recognition of Ware's album later improved, being cited by AllMusic as "the perfect mix of soul, light funk, jazz, and what was about to become the rhythmic foundation for disco." Musical Massage was released on CD for the first time by UK label Expansion Records in 2001 and then by Motown in 2003 in the US.

== Track listing ==
No.	Title	Writer(s)	Length
1.	"Learning How To Love You"	Leon Ware	3:31
2.	"Instant Love"	Jacqueline Hilliard, Leon Ware	3:27
3.	"Body Heat"	Bruce Fisher, Leon Ware, Quincy Jones, Stan Richardson	4:50
4.	"Share Your Love"	T-Boy Ross, Leon Ware, Pam Sawyer	3:30
5.	"Holiday"	Leon Ware	3:25
6.	"Phantom Lover"	Jacqueline Hilliard, Leon Ware	3:52
7.	"Journey Into You"	Leon Ware, Terri McFaddin	4:04
8.	"Musical Massage"	Leon Ware	3:47
9.	"French Waltz"	Leon Ware	2:02
10.	"Turn Out The Light"	Leon Ware, Minnie Riperton, Richard Rudolph	4:01

=== Bonus tracks: The 'I Want You' Sessions ===
No.	Title	Writer(s)	Length
11.	"I Wanna Be Where You Are"	Arthur "T-Boy" Ross, Leon Ware	3:34
12.	"Comfort (A.K.A. Come Live With Me, Angel)"	Jacqueline Hilliard, Leon Ware	6:15
13.	"Long Time No See (Demo for Since I Had You)"	Leon Ware, Pam Sawyer	3:46
14.	"Don't You Wanna Come (Demo for After The Dance)"	Arthur "T-Boy" Ross, Leon Ware	3:42
15.	"You Are The Way You Are"	Arthur "T-Boy" Ross, Leon Ware	3:22

== Personnel ==
- Leon Ware – lead and background vocals
- Jerry Peters, John Barnes, Sonny Burke – keyboards
- Chuck Rainey – bass guitar
- David T. Walker, Ray Parker Jr. – guitar
- James Gadson – drums
- Bobbye Hall, Gary Coleman – percussion
- Eddie "Bongo" Brown – bongo
- Felicia Griner, Jessie Smith, Merry Clayton, Minnie Riperton, Marvin Gaye, Bobby Womack – background vocals
- Azizi Johari – cover artwork model
