= The Sugar Shack =

Painting by Ernie Barnes

The Sugar Shack is a painting created in 1971 by the American Neo-Mannerist artist Ernie Barnes. Barnes made a second, slightly altered copy of the painting in 1976. Both versions depict African Americans dancing in a club, inspired by memories of a visit to the Durham Armory nightclub. The painting gained international exposure when it was used on the cover of the 1976 Marvin Gaye album I Want You and then in the credits of the television series Good Times.

== Background and description ==
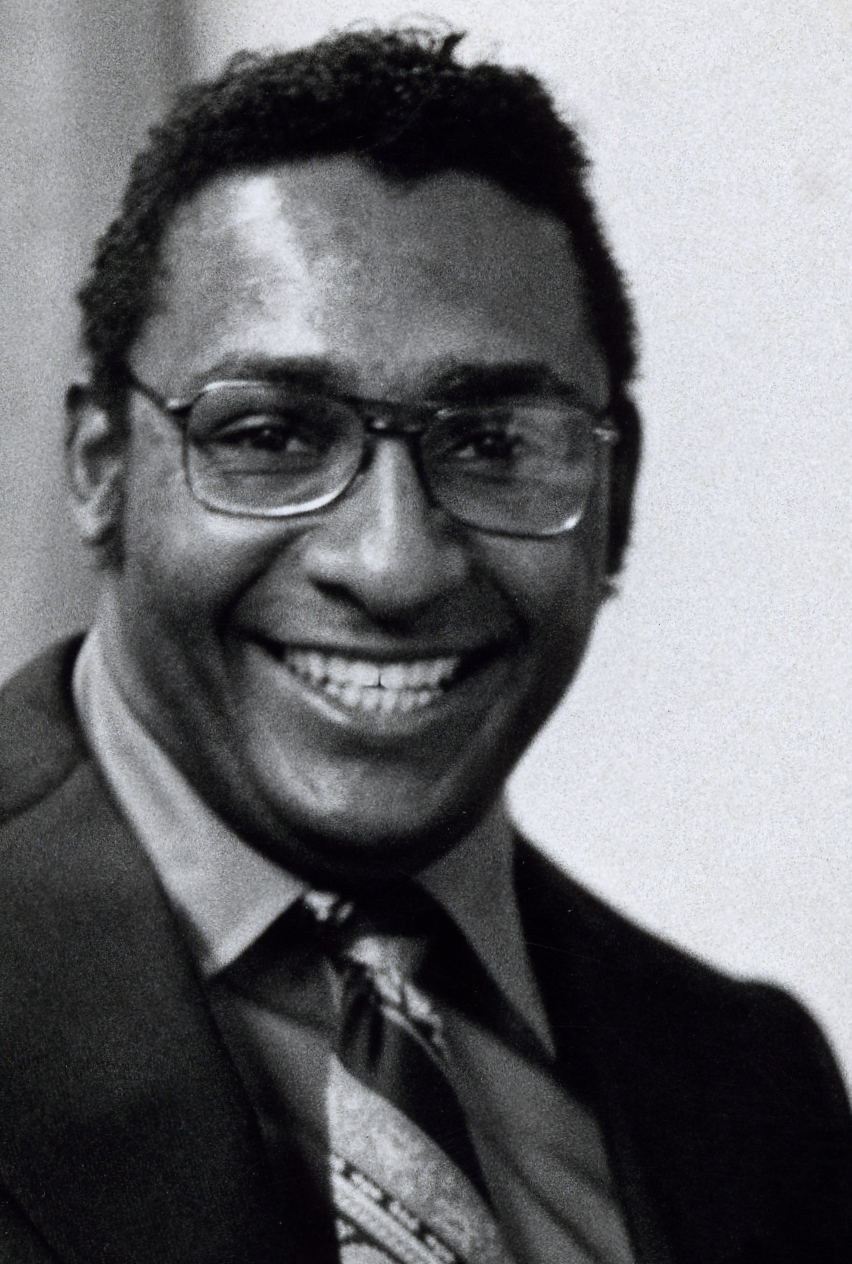
Painter Ernie Barnes in 1974

Barnes created the acrylic on canvas painting in 1971. It depicts black patrons at a nightclub, dancing while a band performs on stage. Several banners hang from the club's ceiling. Most promote weekend events at the club, including a dance contest and appearances by the blues singer Big Daddy Rucker. In the original version of the painting, a banner promotes WSRC, a radio station in Barnes' hometown of Durham, North Carolina. (Note: The painting mistakenly gives the station's frequency as 620 AM, when its actual frequency was 1410 AM. A different Durham station broadcast on 620.) The inspiration for the scene was his memory of once sneaking into the Durham Armory nightclub when he was too young to be admitted. He described that evening as "the first time my innocence met with the sins of dance".

The painting displays the artist's signature Neo-Mannerist style, using serpentine lines, elongation of the human figure, clarity of line, unusual spatial relationships, painted frames, and distinctive color palettes. Art critic Frank Getlein described it as a fusion of the style of Neo Mannerism with the everyday subject matter of genre painting. Mark Anthony Neal describes it as an example of "Black Romantic" art, alluding to Thelma Golden's 2002 exhibition of figurative art by African-American artists at the Studio Museum in Harlem.

== Modifications and use on I Want You ==
Barnes was introduced to the popular singer Marvin Gaye, who purchased The Sugar Shack and several other paintings. Gaye asked for permission to use The Sugar Shack for the cover of his then-forthcoming album I Want You. Barnes agreed and modified the painting to add references to Gaye's album. The banner in the painting showing the WSRC call sign was changed to "WMPG", using the initials the singer's full name, Marvin Pentz Gaye. Another banner was modified to mention "After the Dance", one of the album's singles. A new banner was added on the upper right of the painting promoting the album's title song. The modified painting was used for the cover of the album, which was released in March 1976. After the painting was photographed for use on the cover, Barnes reversed most of the changes, but left the extra banner at the top right. When restoring the banner promoting WSRC, Barnes accidentally misspelled "DIAL" as "DAIL". This restoration became the final version of the original painting, which Gaye kept until his death in 1984.

== Second copy and use on Good Times ==
In 1973, Barnes was hired by television producer Norman Lear to create paintings for Good Times, a sitcom about an African-American family living in a public housing project in Chicago. The paintings Barnes provided for the show are implied to be the work of the family's eldest son, who is an aspiring artist. The Sugar Shack does not appear in the show's first three seasons, but other paintings by Barnes do.

After twice modifying the original Sugar Shack for Gaye, Barnes painted a new copy. In the copy, the "WMPG" version of the radio banner is used, and one of the other banners uses modified wording. However, the extra banner and details promoting Gaye's songs are not included. In the fourth season of Good Times, which began airing in September 1976, the copy version is shown in the show's opening and closing credits. In later seasons it continued to appear in the credits, but not consistently, and sometimes appeared during episodes as a painting in the family's apartment.

== Subsequent ownership ==
Gaye's estate sold the version of painting that he owned for approximately $50,000 to the comedian and actor Eddie Murphy, who confirmed in 2023 that he still owns it.

Barnes sold the second copy to Bob Payson, an attorney in Los Angeles. After Payson's death in 1986, his former law partner Jim Epstein acquired it. It was sold to another owner following a 2021 exhibition at the Andrew Kreps Gallery in New York. That owner put the painting on consignment with Christie's, who auctioned it in May 2022. The winning buyer was businessman Bill Perkins, who bid $13 million and paid $15.275 million after adding the buyer's premium fee.
