= Since I Had You =

Single by Marvin Gaye

from the album I Want You
- Released: 1976
- Recorded: May 22, 1975 – February 10, 1976
- Genre: Soul
- Label: Tamla
- Producers: Leon Ware; Marvin Gaye

Marvin Gaye singles chronology
| "After the Dance" (1976) | "Since I Had You" (1976) | "Got to Give It Up" (1977) |

"Since I Had You" is a quiet storm-styled soul song recorded by singer Marvin Gaye for the I Want You album. The song was co-written by Gaye and the album's producer, Leon Ware.

== Background ==
Initially conceived by Ware and lyricist Pam Sawyer, the song was originally titled "Long Time No See". During the recording sessions, Gaye told Ware that he liked the melody, but he wanted to rewrite the lyrics. Ware approved Gaye's suggestion and they immediately went back in the studio. Sawyer arrived when Gaye was halfway through the song and she was not happy with the new lyrics. Sawyer pulled Ware to the side of the studio and they started to argue about the lyric change. Ware pointed out that it would be hard to convince Gaye to sing the original lyrics because according to Ware, Gaye had a known reputation of leaving the studio if anyone criticized him in the process of recording. Ware then told her, “You’ll have to tell Marvin yourself.” Sawyer left afterward. Subsequently, Ware and Sawyer reconciled and they came to an understanding.

== Overview ==
Similarly to the song "All the Way Round", "Since I Had You" tells the story of a reunion between the singer and a reputed lover, this time at a dance floor and convincing the woman despite the fact their relationship has cooled into a friendship to make love again. Like Come Live with Me Angel" and "Feel All My Love Inside" before, the song includes sexual moans. "Since I Had You" is one of the few songs from the I Want You album that Gaye had performed live. Others include, the title track, "After the Dance", and "All The Way Around".

== Personnel ==
- All vocals and keyboards by Marvin Gaye
- All other instrumentation by assorted musicians
- Produced and written by Leon Ware and Marvin Gaye
