= Come Live with Me Angel =

1976 soul song by Marvin Gaye

"Come Live With Me Angel"
- Limited edition 7-inch vinyl sleeve cover

Song by Marvin Gaye

from the album I Want You
- Released: March 16, 1976
- Recorded: May 23, 1975 – February 4, 1976
- Studio: Sunset Room; Marvin's Room
- Genre: Soul; R&B; smooth soul; funk
- Length: 6:30 (original album version); 7:36 (unedited version)
- Label: Tamla
- Songwriter: Leon Ware
- Lyricist: Jacqueline Dalya
- Producers: Leon Ware; Marvin Gaye; Hal Davis; Berry Gordy, Jr.

"Come Live with Me Angel" (sometimes written "Come Live with Me, Angel") is a smooth soul song by American soul singer Marvin Gaye. The song made its debut as the second track on Gaye's seminal album I Want You via Tamla Records, a subsidiary label of Motown Records. Co-written by singer-songwriter Leon Ware and lyricist Jacqueline Dalya-Hilliard, it was intended for inclusion on the former's album Musical Massage. Ware handed the song to Gaye because the latter showed interest in the former's compositions.

== Background ==
In 1975, Ware recorded a demo of “I Want You” for Arthur "T-Boy" Ross, the younger brother of Motown artist Diana Ross, who wanted a recording contract with the record company. When Motown’s founder Berry Gordy Jr. heard the demo, he brought it to Gaye, who became enamored with the song. Subsequently, Ware went to Gaye's house, where he played his forthcoming record on a cassette tape tentatively titled Comfort. The record had three duets Ware did with Minnie Riperton, including "Come Live With Me, Angel". Gaye reportedly overheard the record through the wall, came to Ware and asked him, "What is that you’re playing?" Ware replied, “It’s my new album". Ware invited Gaye to listen to the record, and they listened repeatedly for hours. The inspired Gaye convinced Ware to give him the songs for his upcoming album, promising that he would "do the whole thing," and Ware agreed. “I brought the music, but the magic that Marvin brought with his vocals made it a classic. I had a body, but Marvin and me dressed it together," Ware said in an interview, reflecting about the making of Gaye's I Want You.

== Composition and lyrics ==
The song is in the key of B minor, and is identified as a quiet storm and smooth soul tune, a signature style of Ware's songwriting. Gaye's rendition features altered lyrics from Ware's original version. In Gaye's version, the song finds him serenading his "sweet angel," promising to understand her moods while asking her to live with him and offers her coition "three times a day in all the ways."

== Recording ==
Ware began recording the song's basic track with Motown session musicians in the Sunset Room at Motown Recording Studios on May 23, 1975. Overdubbing sessions for the rest of the instrumentation and vocals took place on June 12, July 1, and July 3, 1975. Gaye overdubbed his vocals at Marvin's Room on January 30 and February 4, 1976, replacing Ware's and Riperton's harmony vocals.

== Releases ==
The song first appeared on I Want You, Gaye's thirteenth album, released on March 16, 1976. A revised version of the song is featured on Ware's 1995 album Taste The Love as the album's opening track. UK record company Expansion Records reissued Ware's Musical Massage both on vinyl and on CD for the first time in 2001. The 2001 version contains previously unreleased tracks, such as "Comfort (a.k.a. Come Live With Me, Angel)" and "Long Time No See". Motown followed suit by releasing their own expanded edition pressing of the album in 2003. They also issued a deluxe edition of I Want You in the same year, which included an unedited mix of "CLWMA" that features a missing bridge section and several choruses of the trumpet solo played by Chuck Findley. Universal Music Japan and Captain Vinyl partnered to release Gaye's "Come Live With Me, Angel" alongside Meli'sa Morgan's "Fool's Paradise" on 7-inch vinyl exclusively to the Japanese market in 2016.

== Cover versions and samples ==
In 1994, South African singer Audrey Motaung covered "Come Live With Me, Angel" on her album Colours Can't Clash. American hip hop/rap group G-Unit sampled the track on their song "Wanna Get to Know You" from their 2003 album Beg for Mercy, as did musician Mndsgn on his song "Yahlubba (nnu)" from his album Feels, released in 2012.

== Personnel ==
Gaye's version; according to David Ritz, Harry Weinger and AllMusic.

- Marvin Gaye – lead and background vocals, producer
- Leon Ware – background vocals, rhythm arrangements, producer
- Gwanda Hambrick – moaning and sighing vocals
- Motown session musicians (including James Gadson and Chuck Findley) – instrumentation
- Coleridge-Taylor Perkinson – horn and string arrangements
- Hal Davis – producer
- Art Stewart – recording engineer
- Fred Ross – recording engineer
- Berry Gordy, Jr. – executive producer

Ware's version

- Leon Ware – vocals, rhythm arrangements, producer
- Minnie Riperton – vocals
- Hal Davis – producer
- Coleridge-Taylor Perkinson – horn and string arrangements

== Bibliography ==
Richard Torres (2003). Romantic Obsession. I Want You. Deluxe edition liner notes. UMG Recordings, Inc.

Harry Weinger (2003). Romantic Obsession sidebars. "The Dance". I Want You. Deluxe edition liner notes. UMG Recordings, Inc.

David Ritz (2003). I Want You. Deluxe edition liner notes. UMG Recordings, Inc.
