= I Wanna Be Where You Are =

Single by Michael Jackson

from the album Got to Be There
- B-side: "We've Got a Good Thing Going"
- Released: May 2, 1972
- Recorded: November 1971
- Genre: Soul; pop; psychedelic soul
- Length: 3:01
- Label: Motown
- Songwriters: Arthur Ross; Leon Ware
- Producer: Hal Davis

Michael Jackson singles chronology
"Rockin' Robin" (1972)	"I Wanna Be Where You Are" (1972)	"Ain't No Sunshine" (1972)

"I Wanna Be Where You Are" is a song written by Arthur "T-Boy" Ross and Leon Ware for Michael Jackson, who took the song to number 7 in Cash Box and number 16 on the Billboard Hot 100 pop chart. It also reached number 2 on the Billboard R&B singles chart in 1972.

The song was his third straight top-ten pop hit during his early solo career with Motown. It was the first collaboration between Ware and Ross, the younger brother of Diana Ross. This song is one of Jackson's most covered songs, with versions by Zulema, Marvin Gaye, Willie Hutch, Jason Weaver and later The Fugees. Ware and Ross also penned the Marvin Gaye hit "I Want You" several years afterwards.

The song was remixed by Dallas Austin for the 2009 release The Remix Suite.

== Track listing ==
- A. "I Wanna Be Where You Are" - 2:58
- B. "We've Got a Good Thing Going" - 2:59

== Covers and samples ==
- While Willie Hutch's version opened his 1973 album Fully Exposed, Zulema had a dance hit with a disco version of the tune in 1974, featured on her RCA debut album, Zulema (1975).
- In 1976 Marvin Gaye's cover was more of an instrumental excerpt for him singing the title and dedicating the track to his then-girlfriend Janis Hunter and his children Marvin III (referred as "little Marvin" on the record), Nona and Frankie Christian. The alternate instrumental, later issued on a 2003 deluxe edition re-release of the I Want You album, was a funk-styled instrumental that featured Gaye's background vocals harmonizing throughout the track, which was also produced by Ware.

1970s

- Dusty Springfield performed the song on the BBC1 TV show It's Lulu, Not To Mention Dudley Moore, which aired in July 1972.
- Gary Bartz opened his 1972 album Juju Street Songs with an interpretation of the song.
- Marvin Gaye released a version of the song used as an interlude to mark the end of side one of his 1976 album I Want You.
- Co-writer Leon Ware recorded a version for his 1976 Motown album Musical Massage.
- Melissa Manchester released a cover of the song in 1977 which failed to chart.
- Jazz flutist Dave Valentin included an instrumental version of the song on his debut album, Legends, which was also the debut release of the then-new GRP Records label (a subsidiary of Arista Records).

1980s

- José Feliciano, on his first album for Motown Records, produced by Berry Gordy, covered the song in English and then re-recorded it in 1982 on his next LP at Motown in Spanish (the title became "Ahora Si Quiero Amar"). Both versions were hits in Latin America and charted at nr. 63 on R&B USA Billboard.
- R&B artist Sybil recorded the song for her eponymous second album (1989), her first for the American market. The song was released as a single in 1990 and peaked at No. 86 on the US R&B chart.

1990s

- MC Lyte sampled the song for her hit track "Poor Georgie" in 1991.
- Jason Weaver covered the song on the soundtrack to the 1992 miniseries The Jacksons: An American Dream. Weaver also portrayed a young Michael Jackson in the miniseries.
- The Fugees' version interpolates the song with different verses save for the choruses sung by Lauryn Hill.
- Glenn Medeiros covered the song on his 1993 album It's Alright To Love.
- Brazilian singer Patricia Marx covered the song in Portuguese (titled "Ficar com Você", produced by Nelson Motta) on her 1994 album Ficar com Você.
- There is an interpolation of the song in Grand Puba's 1995 hit "I Like It (I Wanna Be Where You Are)" from the album 2000.
- SWV covered the song with Missy Elliott on the 1998 original soundtrack for the film Hav Plenty.

2000s

- Juelz Santana sampled the song on two tracks, "Did U Miss Me pts.1 & 2", on the DJ Green Lantern mixtape Alive on Arrival.
- Romeo Miller's "Too Long" sampled the song on his 2002 album Game Time.
- VH1's 2003 reality series Born To Diva's winner Tarralyn Ramsey sampled the song on her second album, Tarralyn, in 2004.
- B5's "Back In Your Arms" sampled the song on their 2005 eponymous debut album with youngest brother, Bryan, singing lead.
- Chris Brown's "Yo (Excuse Me Miss)" sampled the song on his 2005 eponymous debut album.
- Carleen Anderson performed the song as a duet with Paul Weller on her 2005 album Soul Providence.
- Hutch's version was sampled by singer Mary J. Blige for her song "You Can't Hide from Luv" from her The Breakthrough album.
- Jennifer Lopez sampled the song in her song "Gotta Be There", included on her 2007 album Brave.
- Murs sampled the song for "Can It Be (Half A Million Dollars And 18 Months Later)" on his 2008 album Murs For President.
- MF Doom interpolated the song in "That's That" from his 2009 album Born Like This.
- In July 2009, rapper 50 Cent freestyled over the instrumental and left Jackson's vocals. The song titled "Michael Jackson Freestyle" released on his mixtape Forever King.
- Q "The Kid" sampled the Michael Jackson version of the song in his song "Been Away", which features Jermaine Dupri, and appears on the Drumline soundtrack.

2010s

- Jazz keyboardist Bob Baldwin released a cover from the album Brazil Chill and 2010 for his tribute album Never Can Say Goodbye.
- Cali Swag District sampled the song for their second single, "Where You Are", on their debut album, The Kickback.

=== Beyoncé Knowles version ===
American R&B recording artist Beyoncé Knowles covered the song during her 2009 revue show I Am... Yours, which was held four consecutive nights in July and August. It was later included on her live CD/DVD I Am... Yours: An Intimate Performance at Wynn Las Vegas, which contained the performances from the show of the revue. Later, she covered the song for her 2011 revue show 4 Intimate Nights with Beyoncé held during four non-consecutive nights in August 2011. After delving into her musical history during the show, Knowles states: "I just want to have a good time with y'all," before she begins the revue's set list with her rendition of "I Wanna Be Where You Are", further recalling that she loved singing the song. It was included on the live DVD Live at Roseland: Elements of 4 released on November 21, 2011.

On October 8, 2011 a pre-taped performance of Knowles performing "I Wanna Be Where You Are" was shown at the Michael Forever tribute concert at the Millennium Stadium in Cardiff, Wales. During the performance, she was backed by her all-female band and wore an Afro wig as she performed a funk version of the song. Before beginning the song, she stated: "I remember seeing Michael Jackson for the first time. Lord knows I fell in love... Watching him I realized exactly what I wanted to be. He inspired me so much. As a matter of fact, the first song I performed with Destiny's Child was a Jackson 5 song. It's called 'Where You Are.' It's the song we auditioned to get our record deal. It was the beginning of our future. I love you forever, Michael Jackson." A writer of Rap-Up noted that she "gave audience members goosebumps as she channeled MJ with her moves". Mark Iraheta of Complex magazine wrote that she "lit up the stage and showed off some funky dance moves".

== Song credits ==
=== Michael Jackson version ===
- Produced by Hal Davis
- Lead vocals by Michael Jackson
- Background vocals by Jackie Jackson, Tito Jackson, Jermaine Jackson and Marlon Jackson
- Arrangement by James Anthony Carmichael
- Hollers by Leon Ware and Arthur Ross
- Instrumentation by assorted Los Angeles musicians

=== Marvin Gaye version ===
- All vocals by Marvin Gaye
- Produced by Leon Ware and Marvin Gaye

== Charts ==
Weekly chart performance for "I Wanna Be Where You Are" by Michael Jackson
Chart (1972)	Peak position
Turkey Singles Chart	87
US Billboard Hot 100	16
US Billboard Hot Soul Singles	2
US Cash Box Top 100	7
