= Leon Ware (1972 album) =

Studio album by Leon Ware
- Released: 1972
- Recorded: 1972
- Studio: United Artists Recording Studio
- Genre: Soul
- Length: 30:32
- Label: United Artists Records
- Producer: Leon Ware; Doug Gilmore

Leon Ware chronology
Leon Ware (1972)	Musical Massage (1976)

Singles from Leon Ware
- 1. "The Spirit Never Dies" Released: 1972

Leon Ware is the self-titled debut studio album by American musician Leon Ware. It was released in 1972 and was his only release for United Artists Records.

== Background ==
In 1971, Ware collaborated with Ike & Tina Turner, co-writing several songs on their album, 'Nuff Said. The moderate success of 'Nuff Said led the Turners' record label at the time, United Artists, to hand Ware a recording contract as a solo artist.

== Reception ==
Professional ratings
Review scores
Source	Rating
AllMusic	3.5/5 stars

Although the album failed to chart, the album did receive positive reviews from critics. Bob Talbert of the Detroit Free Press wrote, "Detroiter Leon Ware is a marvelous songwriter". He continued, "Ware is also a superb singer..." Omaha World-Herald commended the album, citing that the album was "the strong, individualistic vocal and piano work of Leon Ware". Moreover, they predicted that "[Ware] should be headed for considerable popularity". In 1972, Ware appeared in an advertisement on Billboard to promote the album.

== Track listing ==
Side one

All tracks are written by Leon Ware, except where noted.

No.	Title	Writer(s)	Length
1.	"The Spirit Never Dies"	Leon Ware; Arthur Ross	2:48
2.	"Able, Qualified and Ready"	Ware; Bonnie Bramlett	3:15
3.	"Why Be Alone"	Ware; Bob Hilliard	3:31
4.	"Mr. Evolution"	Ware; Ross	2:57
5.	"Nothing's Sweeter Than My Baby's Love"		2:43

Side two

No.	Title	Writer(s)	Length
1.	"What's Your World"		4:25
2.	"I Know How It Feels"	Ware; Bramlett	3:23
3.	"It's Just a Natural Thing"		3:26
4.	"Tamed to be Wild"		4:01

== Personnel ==
- Leon Ware – vocals, piano, arrangement, producer
- Doug Gilmore – producer
- Gorden De Witty – piano, organ
- Jeff Brown – organ
- Jackie Clark – guitar, bass
- Ernie McDaniel – bass
- Terry Furlong – guitar
- Jimmy Brown, Stu Perry – drums
- Clydie King, Jesse Smith, Julia Tillman, Maxine Willard, Patrice Holloway – backing vocals
- Christina Hersch, Jerry Burns – recording engineer
- Norman Seeff – art direction, photography
- Dave Bhang – design
