= Inside Is Love =

Studio album by Leon Ware
- Released: 1979
- Recorded: 1979
- Studio: A&M (Hollywood); Hollywood Sound (Hollywood); Black Orpheus (Los Angeles)
- Genre: Soul; funk; R&B
- Label: Fabulous
- Producer: Leon Ware; Ron Roker

Leon Ware chronology
Musical Massage (1976)	Inside Is Love (1979)	Rockin' You Eternally (1981)

Singles from Inside Is Love
- 1. "What's Your Name / Club Sashay" Released: 1979; 2. "Inside Your Love / Hungry" Released: 1980

Professional ratings
Review scores
Source	Rating
AllMusic	4/5 stars

Inside Is Love is an album by Leon Ware released in 1979. This was his third solo album and his only release for TK Records' Fabulous subsidy.

== Background ==
Inside Is Love was produced primarily by Leon Ware, with Ron Roker producing one track, "Small Café". The album included Ware's own version of the Minnie Riperton hit "Inside Your Love", which he had co-written with Riperton and Richard Rudolph. The lead single, "What's Your Name", peaked at No. 42 on the Billboard Hot Soul Singles chart, becoming his biggest hit as a solo artist. "Inside Your Love" was released as a follow-up but did not chart.

== Track listing ==
1. What's Your Name – (Leon Ware) 4:10
2. Inside Your Love – (Leon Ware, Minnie Riperton, Richard Rudolph) 4:35
3. Love Is a Simple Thing – (Marcos Valle, Robert Lamm) 3:03
4. Small Café – (Leon Ware, Ron Roker) 3:43
5. Club Sashay – (Leon Ware, Melissa Manchester) 3:29
6. Try It Out – (Allee Willis, Leon Ware) 3:56
7. Love Will Run Away – (Elkie Brooks, Leon Ware) 4:36
8. On the Island – (Adrienne Anderson, Leon Ware) 4:31
9. Hungry – (Adrienne Anderson, David Blumberg, Leon Ware) 3:56

== Personnel ==
- Leon Ware – lead and background vocals, electric piano
- Criss Hall, Michael King, Sonny Burke – piano
- Pete Robinson – synthesizer
- Eddie Watkins, Frank McDonah, Scott Lipsker – bass
- Bruce Fisher, Chris Roe, David T. Walker, Wah Wah Watson – guitar
- Ed Green, Graham Jarvis, Jeff Holman – drums
- Holden Raphael, Paulinho Da Costa – percussion
- Deborah Thomas, Julia Waters, Maxine Waters, Melissa Manchester, Oren Waters – background vocals
- Deborah Thomas, Plas Johnson – soloist

== Charts ==
Chart (1979)	Peak position
US Top R&B/Hip-Hop Albums (Billboard)	62
