= Willie Morrow =

American businessman and inventor (1939–2022)

- Born: October 9, 1939; Eutaw, Alabama, U.S.
- Died: June 22, 2022 (aged 82); San Diego, California, U.S.
- Occupations: Businessman and inventor
- Spouse: Gloria Morrow

Willie Lee Morrow (October 9, 1939 – June 22, 2022) was an American barber, businessman and inventor, who worked in the African American haircare industry. He was noted for inventing the Afro pick and developing the forerunner to the Jheri curl hairstyle.

== Early life ==
Morrow was born as one of the eight children to Hollie and Olean (Jordan) Morrow in Eutaw, Alabama, on October 9, 1939. His father and mother were sharecroppers, his father also sold bootleg whiskey. He later moved to San Diego, California, where he trained as a barber and stylist at the Independent Barber College, graduating in 1959.

== Career ==
Morrow started his first hair salon in San Diego in 1959. His barbershop was located on Market Street in San Diego from the 1960s through 1990s. He later founded the California Curl Company, which was noted for developing and commercializing the afro pick, also known as the Afro Tease or "Eze Teze". It operated out of a warehouse in Lemon Grove. It also developed the California Curl treatment, precursor to the Jheri curl. The company operated out of a warehouse in nearby Lemon Grove. After writing a manual on how to properly cut textured African American hair, The Principles of Cutting and Styling Negro Hair, Morrow was contracted by the United States Department of Defense to teach Black hair styling techniques to military barbers. In that capacity, he cut hair on US military bases and in combat zones.

Noted African-American painter, and former San Diego Chargers football player, Ernie Barnes portrayed Morrow's barbershop on Market Street in a painting called "Willie's Barbershop".

Morrow also pioneered African American media in San Diego. He first established the Black radio station XHRM 92.5 in 1979, before starting the San Diego Monitor newspaper in 1986. Various items in his collection of antique hairstyling tools were displayed in a museum exhibit about African American hair culture at the California Center for the Arts, Escondido, in 2016.

Morrow also established a "Black Business Boot Camps" for African-American entrepreneurs in San Diego.

== Personal life ==
Morrow married Gloria Morrow in 1966. They remained married for 56 years until his death. Together, they had two children: Cheryl and Angela. Cheryl succeeded her father in managing the San Diego Monitor and running the California Curl Company after his retirement.

Morrow died from pneumonia on June 22, 2022, at his home in San Diego. He was 82 years old.

== Books ==
- The Principles of Cutting and Styling Negro Hair (1966)
- 400 Years Without a Comb (1973)
