= Durham Armory =

Event venue in Durham, North Carolina

- U.S. Historic district – Contributing property
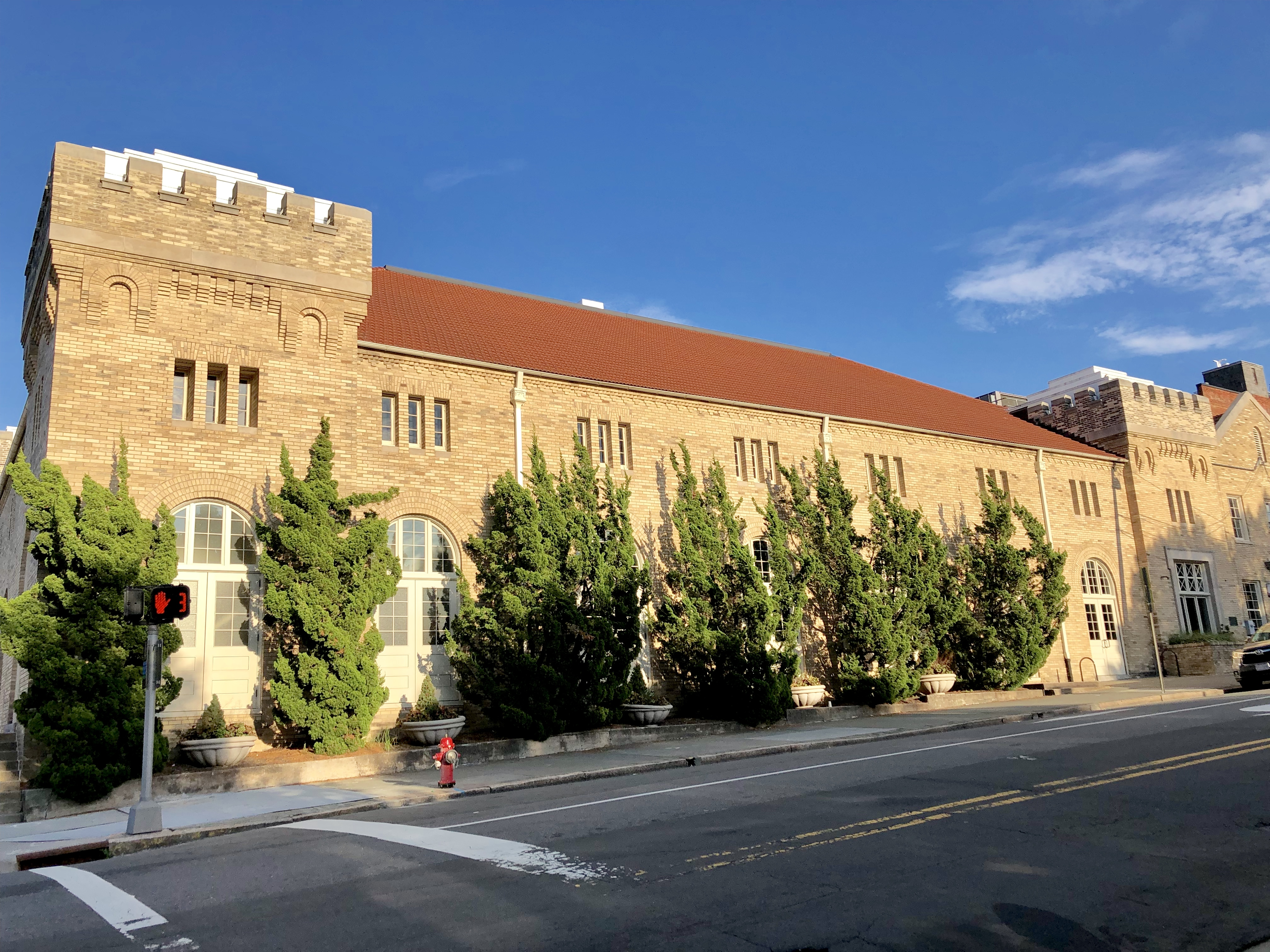
- The Durham Armory in 2019
- Location: 212 Foster Street; Durham, North Carolina, U.S.
- Coordinates: 35.9969°N 78.8982°W
- Built: 1935–1937
- Architect: Atwood and Weeks / Atwood and Nash
- Architectural style: Gothic Revival with Art Deco influences
- Part of: Downtown Durham Historic District (ID77000998)
- Added to NRHP: August 11, 1977

The Durham Armory is a historic event venue and former armory in Durham, North Carolina. Originally constructed between 1935 and 1937, it served as the headquarters for the North Carolina National Guard and has since played a significant role in Durham’s civic and cultural life. It is part of the Downtown Durham Historic District, which was added to the National Register of Historic Places in 1977.

== History ==
The Durham Armory was built on the site of the former City Market, which had been established around 1910. Elements of the original market were incorporated into the Armory’s design, though the extent of this integration is not fully documented. The Armory was one of many Works Progress Administration-era projects in North Carolina, reflecting the Art Deco architectural style popular at the time.

Throughout its history, the Durham Armory has served as a venue for a wide variety of events, including concerts, dances, civic gatherings, and private events. During the 1950s and 1960s, dances at the Armory were segregated by race, with separate events designated for Black and White attendees. Artist Ernie Barnes, who grew up in Durham, attended one such event, which later inspired his famous painting The Sugar Shack. In 1955, the inaugural debutante ball of the Durham Debutante Ball Society was held at the armory.

== Architecture ==
The Durham Armory exhibits a blend of Gothic Revival and Art Deco influences. The exterior features crenellated parapets, decorative arched brickwork, and narrow vertical windows, all characteristic of Gothic Revival military architecture. The building’s symmetrical facade, clean geometric lines, and subtle ornamental brick detailing reflect Art Deco influences, a style often seen in public buildings from the Works Progress Administration (WPA) era.

The main hall is a large, open space designed for versatility, featuring a parquet wood floor, an elevated stage, and balcony seating on three sides. The balcony is supported by exposed steel beams, painted black, contributing to the industrial yet streamlined aesthetic. The interior walls are red brick with rows of rectangular clerestory windows, allowing natural light to enter the space while maintaining a sense of enclosure. The ceiling consists of acoustical tile panels set within a grid of dark steel supports, balancing function with a minimal decorative style.

The building was designed by Atwood & Weeks (sometimes credited as Atwood and Nash), a firm known for civic and military structures. The Durham Armory’s castle-like elements align with other National Guard armories of the period, while its more restrained ornamentation suggests an adaptation to modern design sensibilities.

The main ballroom/auditorium has a capacity of 585 people, with additional balcony seating for 314. The facility also includes a large kitchen, coatroom, snack bar, and storage areas.

== Present Day ==
The Armory is owned and managed by Durham Parks and Recreation and continues to serve as a popular venue for concerts, fundraisers, wedding receptions, seminars, and other community events. The building remains a contributing structure to the Downtown Durham Historic District, which was listed on the National Register of Historic Places (NRHP) in 1977.

== See also ==
- National Register of Historic Places listings in Durham County, North Carolina
