= Rockin' You Eternally =

Studio album by Leon Ware
- Released: 1981
- Recorded: 1980–1981
- Genre: Soul; funk; R&B
- Label: Elektra Records
- Producer: Leon Ware

Leon Ware chronology
Inside Is Love (1979)	Rockin' You Eternally (1981)	Leon Ware (1982)

Singles from Rockin' You Eternally
- 1. "Baby Don't Stop Me" Released: 1980; 2. "Rockin' You Eternally" Released: 1981

Professional ratings
Review scores
Source	Rating
AllMusic	4/5 stars

Rockin' You Eternally is an album by Leon Ware released in 1981. Self-produced by Ware, this was the first of two albums he released for Elektra Records.

== Track listing ==
1. A Little Boogie (Never Hurt No One) - (Leon Ware, Richard Rudolph) 4:30
2. Baby Don't Stop Me - (Laudir de Oliveira, Leon Ware, Marcos Valle, Peter Cetera) 4:02
3. Sure Do Want You Now - (Leon Ware, Richard Rudolph) 3:46
4. Our Time - (Willie Beck, Clarence Willis, James Williams, Leon Ware, Richard Rudolph) 3:44
5. Rockin' You Eternally - (Leon Ware, Marcos Valle) 4:21
6. Got to Be Loved - (Leon Ware, Marcos Valle, Richard Rudolph) 3:49
7. Don't Stay Away - (Leon Ware) 4:01
8. In Our Garden 6:15 - (Leon Ware, Adrienne Anderson)

== Personnel ==
- Leon Ware – lead and background vocals
- Marcos Valle – electric piano
- William Beck – electric piano & Piano
- Michael Boddicker – synthesizer
- Chet Willis – bass & guitar
- James "Diamond" Williams – drums
- Laudier DeOliveira – percussion
- Shadow – background vocals
- Gene Page – String and Horn Arrangements
