= WRJD =

Coordinates: 36°1′44.52″N 78°50′59.03″W

Currently Silent
- Durham, North Carolina; United States
- Broadcast area: Raleigh–Durham–Chapel Hill, North Carolina
- Frequency: 1410 kHz
- Branding: La Verdad Durham-Raleigh

Programming
- Format: Spanish Christian

Ownership
- Owner: Stuart Epperson; (Truth Broadcasting Corporation)

History
- Former call signs: WSRC (1954–2006)
- Call sign meaning: "Rejoice Durham" (reference to former gospel format and city of license)

Technical information
- Licensing authority: FCC
- Facility ID: 17761
- Class: B
- Power: 5,000 watts day; 290 watts night

Links
- Public license information: Public file; LMS

WRJD (1410 AM) is a radio station based in Durham, North Carolina, which is currently silent. Its last broadcast was a Spanish Christian format. It was a heritage radio station that went by WSRC for over half a century.

== History ==
The station signed on the air as WSRC on October 15, 1954, a day most locals remember as the day Hurricane Hazel roared through Central and Eastern North Carolina, causing a great deal of damage and destruction. Despite that initial setback, WSRC managed to continue broadcasting as the first radio station in the Raleigh-Durham market to serve the black community. An FM station signed on at 107.1 in 1965, but was later sold to Duke University in 1968 as WDBS-FM (now WFXC).

Throughout much of its lifetime, WSRC has played a mix of gospel, soul, and R&B music. Along the way, the station has attracted a wealth of talented personalities, including Norfley Whitted, Jimmy "Dr. Jive" Byrd, Durham native Shirley Caesar, and former WTVD news reporter Ervin Hester. WSRC segued to a mostly gospel and inspirational format in the mid-1980s.

On March 16, 2006, Davidson Media Group (who also owned another Durham station, WTIK assumed ownership of WSRC and changed its call letters to WRJD. "Rejoice 1410" operated under a Local Marketing Agreement with Greensboro-based event promotions firm Unwind Productions. Prior to the station changing hands from previous owner Willis Broadcasting (who had been going through serious financial difficulties over the past few years), local gospel group The Cooper Four performed its final live Sunday afternoon broadcast on March 12. The group had been with WSRC since its early beginnings. The Cooper Four would come back to the rechristened WRJD "Rejoice 1410 AM" where they were still heard Sunday mornings at 8:15.

On February 1, 2011, WRJD began simulcasting on co-owned WOLI 910 AM, in Spartanburg, South Carolina, as "Rejoice Radio". While the simulcast lasted only a few months, WRJD would continue to identify both stations at the top of each hour for the remainder of its time as "Rejoice". During this time, Rejoice 1410 was nominated for 2011 Medium Market Station of the Year by the Stellar Awards. However, Davidson Media ended its LMA with Unwind Productions on December 26 that year and WRJD went off the air. The station resumed broadcasting a week later as Poder 1410, airing a Spanish Christian format.

On July 13, 2015, both WRJD and WTIK were sold to TBLC Media as part of a twelve-station deal with Davidson Media, which included stations in Charlotte, Greensboro, Richmond, Spartanburg, and Kansas City. The sale, at a price of $3.5 million, was consummated on November 5, 2015.

Effective May 6, 2021, TBLC Media sold WRJD and WTIK to Stuart Epperson's Truth Broadcasting Corporation for $200,000.

== Sports broadcasting ==
On July 11, 2007, WRJD announced a partnership with North Carolina Central University in Durham to broadcast all eleven games of the 2007 football season, its first in the NCAA Division I Football Championship Subdivision (formerly Division I-AA). This arrangement abruptly ended just ahead of the 2011 football season kick-off.

On January 23, 2008, WRJD became the new flagship station for Durham Bulls radio broadcasts, replacing WDNC who had been carrying Bulls games continuously since 1981. However, that arrangement would not last long, as the Bulls reached an agreement to broadcast games on 99.9 the Fan (owned by Bulls owner Capitol Broadcasting) beginning with the 2009 season.

WRJD also aired Washington Redskins football in 2010, and Atlanta Falcons football in 2008 and 2009, and was an affiliate of the Charlotte 49ers at the time of the station's demise.

In 2017, WRJD began airing Spanish-language sports programming.

== WRJD in popular culture ==
Durham native Ernie Barnes incorporated the former WSRC calls into his best-known painting Sugar Shack, which was featured in the credits of the TV sitcom Good Times as well as the cover of Marvin Gaye's 1976 album I Want You. Oddly enough, WSRC was erroneously listed as "620 on your dail (sic)', which is the frequency for fellow Durham radio station WDNC.
