= Leon Ware (1982 album) =

Studio album by Leon Ware
- Released: 1982
- Recorded: 1982
- Studio: Ocean Way, Los Angeles; The Village, Los Angeles
- Genre: Soul; funk; R&B
- Label: Elektra Records
- Producer: Leon Ware; Marty Paich

Leon Ware chronology
Rockin' You Eternally (1981)	Leon Ware (1982)	Undercover (1987)

Singles from Leon Ware
- 1. "Why I Came To California" Released: 1982; 2. "Slippin' Away" Released: 1982

Leon Ware is the second self-titled and overall fifth studio album by American musician Leon Ware, released in 1982. It was his second and final release for Elektra Records. The album was produced by Ware and Marty Paich.

== Background ==
Ware's previous release, Rockin' You Eternally, was not a huge success commercially; nevertheless, Elektra Records financed a follow-up that became his second self-titled album.

== Release and reception ==
Professional ratings
Review scores
Source	Rating
AllMusic	3/5 stars

Upon release, Leon Ware failed to reach the charts, and it flopped, which led to his discharge from Elektra Records. Despite the commercial failure, the album was modestly acclaimed and received mostly positive reviews from contemporary critics. Florestine Purnell of The Kansas City Star commended the album and its songs; she called it "an excellent opportunity to get better acquainted with [Ware]." She also praised Ware's vocal style, citing it as "smooth and classy." Furthermore, she noted that the tonal quality of Ware's voice is reminiscent of Smokey Robinson, Peabo Bryson and Marvin Gaye. Similarly, The Sacramento Bee found Ware's "achingly pure falsetto" voice on-par with Gaye's and wrote that "Ware brings a depth to a well-mined genre through his tender phrasing and dreamy melodies..." Tim Gebhart of Rapid City Journal expressed his disappointment, calling the album "unfulfilling" considering Ware's production background and the "stellar" line-up of musicians featured on the album. In a retrospective review, Jason Elias of AllMusic commented, "Leon Ware, more often than not, seems to be overly concerned with making a big hit." He also pointed out that Ware "sounded wan and hemmed in." He dubbed the opening track, "Slippin' Away," as the best track of Leon Ware while also criticizing it as it reminded him of a "so-so" song from Earth, Wind & Fire's 1980 album Faces. He added, "Given the fact that this didn't include many great songs, Leon Ware isn't the best way to get acquainted with the artist."

== Reissue and influence ==
Leon Ware was reissued on vinyl and CD several times from 1998 to 2015.

In 2011, American rapper and singer Theophilus London released his debut album Timez Are Weird These Days, which features an allusion to Leon Ware on the album's cover.

== Track listing ==
1. Slippin' Away (David Foster, David Paich, Leon Ware) 4:11
2. Lost In Love With You (Geoffrey Leib) 3:52
3. Shelter (Allee Willis, Leon Ware) 3:56
4. Why I Came To California (Janis Siegel, Leon Ware) 4:10
5. Deeper Than Love (Leon Ware, Marcos Valle) 3:23
6. Can I Touch You There (William Beck, Chet Willis, James Williams, Leon Ware) 4:05
7. Words Of Love (Marti Sharron, Zenobia Conkerite) 4:35
8. Miracles (Bill Champlin, Leon Ware) 4:06
9. Somewhere (Laudir de Oliveira, Leon Ware, Marcos Valle) 4:15
10. Where Are They Now (John Bettis, Richard Kerr) 4:21

== Personnel ==
According to AllMusic.

Musicians:

- Leon Ware – lead and background vocals
- Marty Paich – electric piano, piano
- David Foster – electric piano
- Geoffrey Leib – electric piano & synthesizer
- Roland S. Burke – piano
- Gary Chang – synthesizer
- David T. Walker, Dean Parks, Steve Lukather – guitar
- Nathan East, Chuck Rainey, Abraham Laboriel – bass guitar
- Lenny Castro, Laudir de Oliveira – percussion
- Kurt McGettrick, Gato Barbieri – saxophone
- Airto Moreira – backing vocals, percussion
- Jeff Porcaro, James Gadson – drums
- Eddie "Bongo" Brown – bongos
- Bill Champlin, Tamara Champlin, Bonnie Bramlett, Chris Bennett, Joann Harris, Rita Coolidge, Janis Siegel, Flora Purim – background vocals

Production:

- Leon Ware – producer
- Marty Paich – producer, string and rhythm arranger
- Sid Sharp – concert master
- Jerry Hey – horn arranger
- Allen Sides – recording engineer, mixing engineer
- John Hanlon – overdub engineer, vocal engineer
- Robin Laine, Mark Ettel – assistant engineer
- Kathy Morphesis – designer
- Ron Coro – art director
- Bobby Holland – photographer
- Isao Kikuchi – digital remastering engineer
