= I Want You (Marvin Gaye album) =

Studio album by Marvin Gaye
- Released: March 16, 1976
- Recorded: 1975–1976
- Studios: Marvin's Room; Hitsville West (Los Angeles)
- Genres: Disco; R&B; soul; quiet storm
- Length: 37:43
- Label: Tamla
- Producers: Marvin Gaye; Leon Ware; Arthur "T-Boy" Ross

Marvin Gaye chronology
Marvin Gaye Live! (1974)	I Want You (1976)	Marvin Gaye's Greatest Hits (1976)

Singles from I Want You
- 1. "I Want You" Released: April 1, 1976; 2. "After the Dance" Released: July 15, 1976; 3. "Since I Had You" Released: 1976

I Want You is the thirteenth studio album by the American soul singer and songwriter Marvin Gaye. It was released on March 16, 1976, by the Motown Records subsidiary label Tamla.

Gaye recorded the album during 1975 and 1976 at his studio Marvin's Room in Los Angeles and at Motown's Los Angeles–based Hitsville West studio. The album has often been noted by critics for producer Leon Ware's cinematic, downtempo sound, the erotic themes in his and Gaye's songwriting, and the singer's prominent use of the synthesizer. The album's cover artwork adapts neo-mannerist artist Ernie Barnes's famous painting The Sugar Shack (1971).

I Want You consisted of Gaye's first recorded studio material since his highly successful and well-received album Let's Get It On (1973). It continued a change in musical direction for Gaye, as he had departed from the trademark Motown-influenced sound towards a funky, light-disco soul, and the album maintained and expanded on his prior album's sexual themes. Following a mixed response from critics at the time of its release, I Want You has earned retrospective recognition from writers and music critics as one of Gaye's most controversial works and influential to such musical styles as disco, quiet storm, R&B, and neo soul.

== Background ==
By 1975, Marvin Gaye had come off of the commercial and critical success of his landmark studio album Let's Get It On (1973), its successful supporting tour following the album's release, and Diana & Marvin (1973), a duet project with Diana Ross. However, similar to the conception and recording of Let's Get It On, Gaye had struggled to come up with an album as an appropriate follow-up. And much like Let's Get It On Gaye reached for outside help, this time seeking the assistance of Leon Ware, a singer and songwriter who had found previous success writing hits for fellow Motown alum, including pop singer Michael Jackson and the rhythm and blues group The Miracles. Ware had been working on songs for his own album which he would later issue under the title Musical Massage, a collection of erotic singles Ware had composed with a variety of writers, including Jacqueline Hilliard and Arthur "T-Boy" Ross, brother of Diana Ross. When Motown CEO Berry Gordy paid a visit to Ware, the songwriter was more than happy to play Gordy his selection of tracks. After hearing a preliminary mix of the songs however, Gordy figured that Ware should let Gaye handle his material.

While the majority of the album's songs were conceived by Ware, and he co-wrote every song, I Want You was transformed into a biographical centerpiece for Gaye, who was then in a volatile marriage with Anna Gordy, sister to Berry Gordy, and also in a long-standing affair with Janis Hunter, who would later become the mother of his two youngest children. Gaye and Hunter were introduced to each other by producer Ed Townsend in 1973 at Hitsville West, while Townsend and Gaye were recording Let's Get It On. Hunter was 17 years old while Gaye was 17 years her senior at the time Townsend introduced them. In his book Mercy, Mercy Me: The Art, Loves, and Demons of Marvin Gaye, the author and music writer Michael Eric Dyson elaborated on the relationship between I Want You and Gaye's affair with Hunter:

"I Want You is unmistakably a work of romantic and erotic tribute to the woman he deeply loved and would shortly marry, Janis Hunter. Gaye's obsession with the woman in her late teens is nearly palpable in the sensual textures that are the album's aural and lyrical signature. Their relationship was relentlessly passionate and emotionally rough-hewn; they played up each other's strengths, and played off each other's weaknesses."

Though it was often hinted that Let's Get It On was the album Gaye had dedicated to her, Marvin has stated that this album was dedicated to Hunter, who is believed to have been in the studio when he recorded it. According to music critics, her presence may have increased the emotion in Ware's and Gaye's conception of I Want You. From Gaye's first recordings of I Want You to the album's release in 1976, Hunter and Gaye married and divorced in the span of three short years. Having gone mostly silent since the years of Gaye's death, Janis broke her silence in 2013 by releasing a book titled, After the Dance: My Life with Marvin Gaye where she recalls her turbulent and often violent relationship with Marvin.

== Recording and production ==
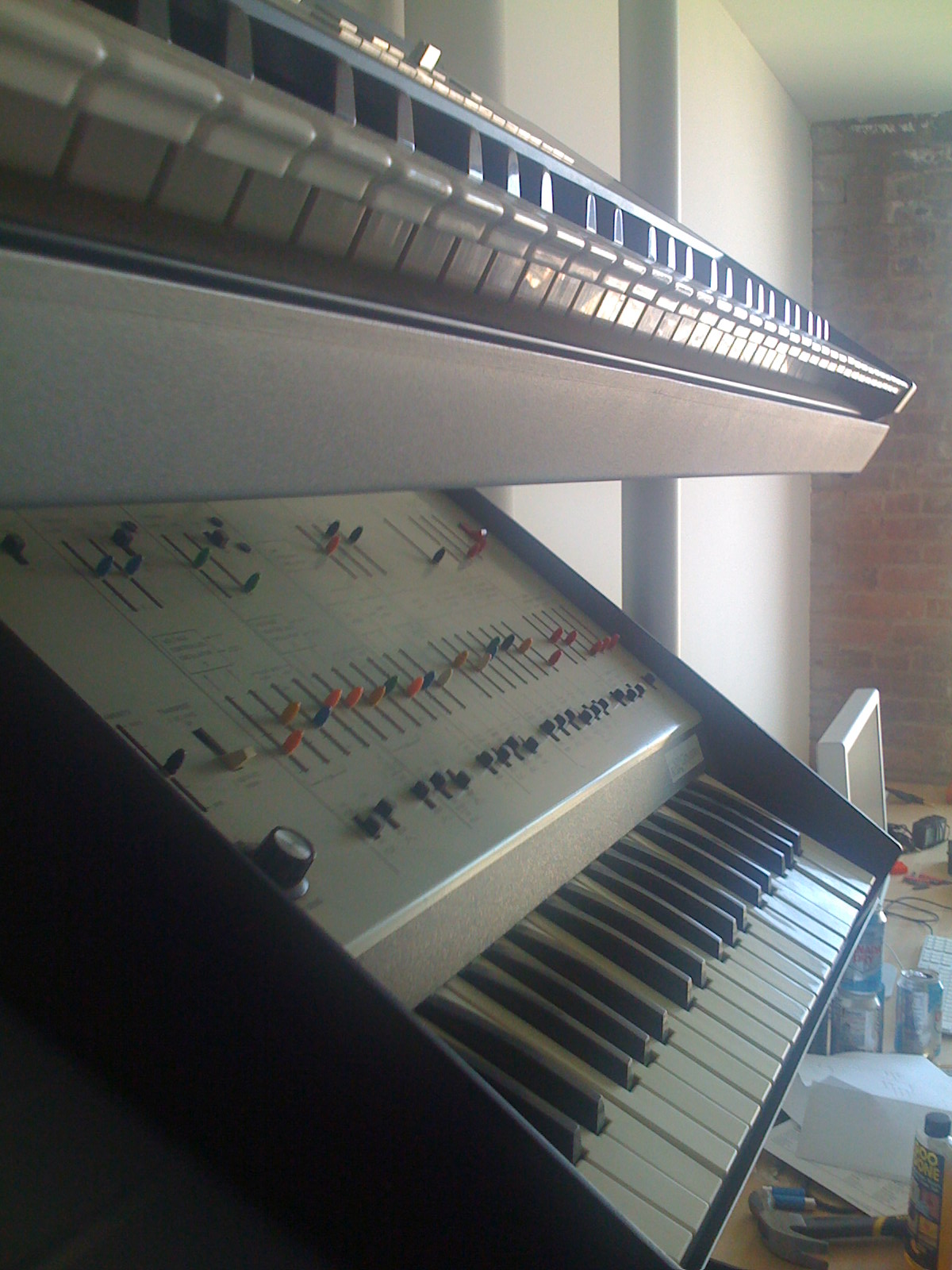
An ARP Odyssey, used by Gaye for the recording

Gaye and Ware recorded and mixed the album at Gaye's newly christened "Marvin's Room Studio", located on Sunset Boulevard in Los Angeles, and at Motown Recording Studios. The recording sessions took place throughout 1975 and 1976. Much like Gaye's previous studio effort Let's Get It On, I Want You featured Gaye's contribution of background vocals and heavy multi-tracking. Gaye's vocalizing style was in classic doo-wop tradition accompanied by the low tempo of string arrangements and other instrumentation was provided by the Funk Brothers.

"Feel All My Love Inside"
The explicitly sexual song contains background moans.

"After the Dance (Vocal)"
The closing track is a quiet storm ballad with downtempo grooves and synthesizer work.

Gaye's albums, and especially I Want You, have been influential on modern soul music and contemporary R&B. EMI Artists and Repertoire executive Gary Harris, who later assisted neo soul singer D'Angelo in recording his debut album Brown Sugar (1995), later commented on Gaye's significant artistry on I Want You and its opening title track. In an interview with writer Michael Eric Dyson, Harris comments on another popular track from the album "Soon I'll Be Loving You Again":

With the opening, with the congas and the strings; it's like the sun is rising. It's a very cinematic approach to the whole thing. It shows a thing Quincy Jones called "ear candy." The voicings and the arrangements convey not only mood but time, place and image. He's talking about "dreamed of you this morning." It's crazy. The other thing about Marvin and the song is he always, no matter what he was doing, how many risks he would take, he was a radical traditionalist and always held onto his doo-wop upbringing. Those background harmonies ... no matter how increasingly percussive he got, how funky, the background vocals were always steeped in that tradition.

Another significant feature of the recording sessions for I Want You was Gaye's use of the synthesizer in his music. During the time of recording, the instrument had entered its modern period of use and had been included in the music of such popular acts as Stevie Wonder and Led Zeppelin. For the instrumental version of "After the Dance", Gaye implemented it for a more spacey sound than his previous recordings had featured. Other recordings from these sessions to feature Gaye's synthesizer were later featured on the deluxe edition re-release of I Want You.

== Artwork ==
The original The Sugar Shack painting, which was later used for the front album cover of I Want You, was painted and released by neo-mannerist artist Ernie Barnes in 1971. In 1976, Barnes redesigned the painting for use by television producer Norman Lear for the opening credits of Good Times, his hit CBS sitcom that ran from 1974 to 1979. The Sugar Shack portrays a cultural image of a shack full of black people dancing. The Sugar Shack was painted by Barnes in his signature post-mannerist style, using serpentine lines, elongation of the human figure, clarity of line, unusual spatial relationships, painted frames, and distinctive color palettes. This style of technique and composition is similar to the mannerist style of 16th-century artists such as Michelangelo and Raphael, which has led Barnes to be credited as the founder of the Neo-Mannerism movement. Art critic Frank Getlein later called The Sugar Shack a "stunning demonstration of the fusion of Neo-Mannerism and Genre painting that Barnes alone has perfected and practices", and went on to say:

The dances of ordinary people have been a standard subject of Genre painting since it was invented by Breughel. The perfectly controlled lighting and the elaborate poses of the elongated figures are class Mannerism. Sugar Shack effortlessly combines the two heritages in Neo-Mannerism Genre painting. Any Mannerist painter would be proud of the succession of figures in the main, central group of dancers, but the whole is infused with the innocent exuberance of Breughel and his fellow Flemings.

The Sugar Shack has been known to art critics for embodying the style of art composition known as "Black Romantic", which, according to Natalie Hopkinson of The Washington Post, is the "visual-art equivalent of the Chitlin' Circuit." According to Barnes, he created the original version after reflecting upon his childhood, during which he was not "able to go to a dance." In an interview with SoulMuseum.net, Barnes was asked whether there were any messages he was attempting to express through the painting. He stated "'Sugar Shack' is a recall of a childhood experience. It was the first time my innocence met with the sins of dance. The painting transmits rhythm so the experience is re-created in the person viewing it. To show that African-Americans utilize rhythm as a way of resolving physical tension"

Gaye was introduced to Barnes by colleague Barbara Hunter, which led to him buying eight Barnes originals, including The Sugar Shack. After Gaye asked him for permission to use the painting as an album cover, Barnes then augmented the painting by adding references to Gaye's album, including banners hanging from the ceiling of the shack promoting the album's singles. Since the initial wide acclaim for The Sugar Shack, Barnes has gained further recognition from art critics as one of the best black painters of his time and was cited by the Oakland Tribune as the "Picasso of the black art world." The original piece was later purchased by actor and comedian Eddie Murphy.

== Release and reception ==
Professional ratings
Review scores
Source	Rating
AllMusic	4.5/5 stars
Chicago Tribune	2/4 stars
Tom Hull	B−
Q	4/5 stars
The Rolling Stone Album Guide	2.5/5 stars
Sounds	4/5 stars
Uncut	4/5 stars
The Village Voice	C+

I Want You was released March 16, 1976, in the United States on the Motown-subsidiary label Tamla Records. While not as successful sales-wise as Gaye's previous landmark albums What's Going On and Let's Get It On, I Want You sold in excess of one million copies in the United States with help mostly coming from its first single "I Want You". The single topped the Billboard Soul Singles chart, quickly becoming Marvin Gaye's eleventh number-one hit on that chart, while peaking at number fifteen on the Billboard Pop Singles chart.

The album's second single, the quiet storm track "After the Dance (Vocal)", charted modestly, peaking at No. 14 on the Soul Singles chart and No. 74 on the Pop Singles chart, while another single release version of the song, a double A-sided vinyl record for dance clubs and discothèques, hit the top ten of the Billboard Disco Singles chart. The song became a staple of dance clubs and discothèques during the late 1970s. "After the Dance" was hailed as one of Gaye's signature songs during the late 1970s and was later described by Gaye-biographer David Ritz as "emblematic for the final chapter of his career." I Want You became his fourth album to reach the top ten of the Billboard 200 chart and his fifth number-one album on the Soul Albums chart.

Despite its chart success, I Want You received mixed reviews from music critics at the time of its release. It has been noted by music writers that the critical reception of disco music in general had been poor and ill-considered, which may have caused the slightly disco-styled I Want You to suffer critically, in comparison to Gaye's previous albums. Los Angeles Times writer Dennis Hunt called the album "disappointing" and "only partially commendable". Rolling Stone's Vince Aletti criticized Leon Ware's production for being too low-key, and perceived that Gaye lacks the certain passion in his lyricism and singing from his previous records. Aletti compared the album to Gaye's previous work, writing that "Gaye seems determined to take over as soul's master philosopher in the bedroom, a position that requires little but an affectation of constant, rather jaded horniness. The pose has already been established in Let's Get It On, on which Gaye was hot, tender, aggressive, soothing and casually raunchy—the modern lover with all his contradictions. I Want You continues in the same vein but with only the faintest traces of the robust passion that shot through and sustained the earlier album ... one expects something with a little more substance and spirit. But there's no fire here, only a well-concealed pilot light."

Cliff White of NME called the album "almost a voyeur's delight", and was not favorable of Gaye's sensual themes, stating "Although getting down, getting mellow, and getting it on are paramount considerations in the privacy of my own home, I don't particularly want to be party to someone else's night life. Not on record anyway ... Like peeking through the windows of the Gaye residence in the wee wee hours. Perhaps that's your kick, but personally I find it a mite frustrating." White also criticized the album's sound, describing the songs as "all expressions of the same mood. Sensual, satisfied, and spaced out", and calling I Want You "simply the explorative aftermath of Let's Get It On. The sweet nuthin's of a drowsy, sweat-streaked lover." Robert Christgau of The Village Voice wrote favorably of the album's sound quality. However, he criticized the lyrical content, as well as Ware's involvement in songwriting, stating "was it Ware who instructed Marvin to eliminate all depth and power from his voice? I mean, if you're into insisting on sex it's in bad taste to whine about it."

== Legacy and influence ==
After critical re-examination of the album, I Want You has been recognized by writers and music writers as one of Marvin Gaye's most controversial and influential works and, much like its predecessor Let's Get It On, has served as a major influence on the quiet storm and contemporary R&B genres. Its standing has also improved among critics following an expanded edition release of the album on July 29, 2003, which featured extensive liner notes and photography by Ryan Null. Following that release, AllMusic praised Gaye's different direction in music and the eroticism portrayed in Leon Ware's smooth-tempo production and Gaye's intimate lyricism. Reviewer Thom Jurek wrote:

Its subject matter is as close to explicit as pop records got in 1976 ... The feel of the album was one of late-night parties in basements and small clubs, and the intimacy of the music evokes the image of people getting closer as every hour of a steamy night wears on ... the most astonishing things about I Want You are its intimacy, silky elegance, and seamless textures ... I Want You and its companion, Ware's Musical Massage, are the pre-eminent early disco concept albums. They are adult albums about intimacy, sensuality, and commitment, and decades later they still reverberate with class, sincerity, grace, intense focus, and astonishingly good taste. I Want You is as necessary as anything Gaye ever recorded, and is as compelling in the 21st century as when it was first issued.

Such musicians as Todd Rundgren, Robert Palmer and Madonna have stated they were influenced by I Want You, while songs from the album have been sampled by such hip hop artists as EPMD to Mary J. Blige, who sampled the title track for her hit song "Be Happy". The careers of neo soul and R&B musicians including D'Angelo, Musiq Soulchild, R. Kelly, Maxwell (particularly on Urban Hang Suite), Sade, and Prince show the influence of the soulful sound and equally romantic and erotic lyrics of I Want You, Let's Get It On and Leon Ware's Musical Massage. According to one critic, Ware's arrangements "solidified the suite-like theme for the album." Much like Let's Get It On, slow jam music, as well as modern soul and the quiet storm genre, are now viewed by critics to have been engendered by I Want You and by Gaye.

Following the release of I Want You, Ware released Musical Massage (1976), which received little mainstream notice. Despite this, Musical Massage, Ware's second studio album, became a cult hit among soul music fans who were intrigued by I Want You and songs from that album's producer. Critical recognition of Ware's album later improved, being cited by AllMusic as "the perfect mix of soul, light funk, jazz, and what was about to become the rhythmic foundation for disco."

== Track listing ==
Side one
No.	Title	Writer(s)	Length
1.	"I Want You" (vocal)	Arthur "T-Boy" Ross, Leon Ware	4:35
2.	"Come Live with Me Angel"	Jacqueline Hilliard, Ware	6:28
3.	"After the Dance" (instrumental)	Marvin Gaye, Ware	4:21
4.	"Feel All My Love Inside"	Gaye, Ware	3:23
5.	"I Wanna Be Where You Are"	Ross, Ware	1:17

Side two
No.	Title	Writer(s)	Length
1.	"I Want You" (intro jam)	Ross, Ware	0:20
2.	"All the Way Around"	Ross, Ware	3:50
3.	"Since I Had You"	Gaye, Ware	4:05
4.	"Soon I'll Be Loving You Again"	Gaye, Ross, Ware	3:14
5.	"I Want You" (jam)	Ross, Ware	1:41
6.	"After the Dance" (vocal)	Gaye, Ware	4:40

- Sides one and two were combined as tracks 1–11 on digital reissues.

2002 remaster bonus tracks
No.	Title	Length
12.	"I Want You" (vocal; single mix)	3:28
13.	"I Want You" (instrumental; single mix)	4:39
14.	"Strange Love (Feel All My Love Inside)" (instrumental; single mix)	2:58

=== Deluxe edition ===
In 2003, I Want You was reissued by Motown as a two-disc expanded edition release, featuring 24-bit digital remastering of the original album's recordings, previously unissued material, and a 24-page booklet, which contains the original LP liner notes by Marvin Gaye, as well as comprehensive essays by writers including David Ritz.

Original LP (Disc one)

1. "I Want You" (vocal) – 4:36
2. "Come Live with Me Angel" – 6:30
3. "After the Dance" (instrumental) – 4:25
4. "Feel All My Love Inside" – 3:23
5. "I Wanna Be Where You Are" – 1:17
6. "I Want You" (intro jam) – 0:19
7. "All the Way Around" – 3:50
8. "Since I Had You" – 4:05
9. "Soon I'll Be Loving You Again" – 3:13
10. "I Want You" (intro jam) – 1:40
11. "After the Dance" (vocal) – 4:42
12. "I Want You" (vocal, promo only version) – 3:38
13. "I Want You" (instrumental) – 4:39
14. "Strange Love" (Feel All My Love Inside)" (instrumental) – 2:57

The Sessions| alternate mixes, vocals & outtakes (Disc two)

1. "I Want You" (vocal & rhythm) – 5:05
2. "Come Live with Me Angel" (alternate version) – 7:37
3. "After the Dance" (instrumental) – 5:33
4. "Feel All My Love Inside" (alternate version) – 3:52
5. "I Wanna Be Where You Are" (alternate version) – 6:07
6. "I Want You" (guitar jam) – 0:29
7. "All the Way Around" (alternate version) – 3:52
8. "Since I Had You" (alternate version) – 4:16
9. "Soon I'll Be Loving You Again" (alternate version) – 4:30
10. "I Want You" (jam, undubbed) – 4:52
11. "After the Dance" (vocal, alternate version) – 5:14
12. "I Wanna Be Where You Are (After the Dance)" – 4:01
13. "You Are the Way You Are" (instrumental) – 4:26
14. "Is Anybody Thinking About Their Living?" – 4:23

== Personnel ==
- Bass guitar: Chuck Rainey, Wilton Felder, Ron Brown, Henry Davis
- Drums: James Gadson
- Guitar: David T. Walker, Dennis Coffey, Melvin "Wah Wah" Watson, Ray Parker Jr., Jay Graydon
- Piano Fender Rhodes: Jerry Peters, John Barnes, Sonny Burke, Marvin Gaye
- Bongos, Congas: Bobbye Hall Porter, Eddie "Bongo" Brown
- Percussion: Gary Coleman, Jack Arnold
- Synthesizer: Marvin Gaye
- Vocals: Marvin Gaye
- String and horn arrangements: Coleridge-Taylor Perkinson
- Engineer: Fred Ross, Art Stewart
- Executive Producer: Berry Gordy, Marvin Gaye
- Producer: Leon Ware, Marvin Gaye, Arthur "T-Boy" Ross (co-produced tracks: A1, A3, B1, B2, B4–B6)
- Artwork: Ernie Barnes, Frank Mulvey

== Charts ==
=== Weekly charts ===
Chart (1976)	Peak position
US Billboard 200	4
US Top R&B/Hip-Hop Albums (Billboard)	1

=== Year-end charts ===
Chart (1976)	Peak positions
U.S. Billboard Pop Albums	53
U.S. Billboard Top Soul Albums	13

== See also ==
- List of number-one R&B albums of 1976 (U.S.)

== Bibliography ==
- David Ritz (2003). I Want You. Deluxe edition liner notes. UMG Recordings, Inc.
- Michael Eric Dyson (2005). Mercy, Mercy Me: The Art, Loves and Demons of Marvin Gaye. New York, NY: Basic Civitas Books. ISBN 0-465-01770-3.
- Nathan Brackett, Christian Hoard (2004). The New Rolling Stone Album Guide. Completely Revised and Updated 4th Edition. Simon and Schuster. ISBN 0-7432-0169-8.
