= After the Dance (song) =

Single by Marvin Gaye

from the album I Want You
- B-side: "Feel All My Love Inside"
- Released: July 15, 1976
- Recorded: September 1975 – March 1976
- Studio: Marvin Gaye Studios (Los Angeles, California); Motown Recording Studios (Hollywood, California)
- Genre: Soul, funk, downtempo
- Length: 4:40 (album version); 3:30 (single version)
- Label: Tamla
- Songwriters: Marvin Gaye, Leon Ware
- Producer: Leon Ware

Marvin Gaye singles chronology
"I Want You" (1976)	"After the Dance" (1976)	"Since I Had You" (1976)

"After the Dance" is a slow jam song recorded by singer Marvin Gaye. Credited to Gaye and Leon Ware, it was primarily written by Ware with lyrical contribution from Gaye. It was released on July 15, 1976 as the second single off Gaye's hit album I Want You. Though it received modest success, the song is widely considered to be one of Gaye's best ballads and served as part of the template for quiet storm and urban contemporary ballads that came afterwards.

== Overview ==
The song narrates a moment where the author noticed a woman on Soul Train and convinces her to "get together" after the two shared a dance. Throughout the entire I Want You album, which was dedicated to Marvin's live-in lover Janis Hunter (who wrote a 2015 memoir entitled After the Dance: My Life with Marvin Gaye), the narrator — Gaye — brings up the dance concept in songs such as "Since I Had You". The song also served in a funky instrumental, which included a synthesizer solo performed by Gaye just days before the master mix of the I Want You album was due at Motown.

== Critical reception ==
Record World praised Gaye's "strong performance" of the song. The instrumental version received a nomination at the 1977 Grammy Awards for Best R&B Instrumental Song. Donald A. Guarisco of AllMusic noted, the song "remains a favorite with [Gaye's] fans thanks to the singer's stunning multi-tracked vocals."

== Recording ==
The basic track of "After the Dance" was recorded for Gaye with the working title "Don't You Wanna Come?" in September 1975. The overdubbing sessions took place between January 1976 to March 1976.

== Chart performance ==
The song was Gaye's lowest-peaked pop single for the first time in 13 years since the B-side of his "Can I Get a Witness" titled "I'm Crazy 'Bout My Baby", peaking at number 74, ironically three places higher than "I'm Crazy 'Bout My Baby", while it was a bigger success on the R&B chart, peaking at number 14.

== Covers ==
The song has since been covered by a legion of jazz vocalists and groups including Fourplay, who covered it with longtime Gaye admirer, R&B singer El DeBarge, in 1991. Their version was released as a single that year and re-introduced newer listeners to Gaye's original.

Hall & Oates covered the song on their 2004 album Our Kind of Soul.

== Personnel ==
Personnel per David Ritz and Harry Weinger.

- Lead, background vocals, piano and synthesizer by Marvin Gaye
- Instrumentation by various studio musicians, some of which include, drummer James Gadson and flutist Ernie Watts (featured on the instrumental version)
- Orchestral arrangements by Coleridge-Taylor Perkinson
- Rhythm arrangements by Leon Ware
- Produced by Leon Ware and Marvin Gaye
- Recording engineering by Art Stewart and Fred Ross
