= Marvin's Room (studio) =

Recording studio in Los Angeles

Marvin's Room (originally named Marvin Gaye Studios) is a recording studio founded by American recording artist Marvin Gaye in Los Angeles, California.

Created by the singer in 1975 soon after re-negotiating his deal with Motown, the singer built the studios on Sunset Boulevard in Hollywood, as a spacious apartment-like complex, big enough to be a studio, home and, for a time, a dance club. Mix Magazine Editor Tom Kenny called it "the Studio 54 of the West Coast".

There, Gaye recorded his late-1970s material including I Want You, Here, My Dear, the hit single "Got to Give It Up", his shelved Ballads album (later released as the Vulnerable album in 1997), and a shelved disco-styled album, Love Man, which was later re-worked and released in 1981 as In Our Lifetime.

Gaye's studio would often run parties where many of the Hollywood elite including Diana Ross and Muhammad Ali and other musicians and even politicians would be spotted.

The studio was shut down as the singer's legal and financial troubles foreclosed on his house and cars, as well as the studio. Marvin's ex-wife, Janis Gaye, said that Marvin was "emotionally crushed" by the sale of the studio at the end of 1979.

It was later renamed in the mid-1980s as Eldorado Studios where rock groups such as Alice in Chains recorded, with them unaware that the studio was once owned by Gaye. In 1997, the studio was restored by former record company A&R executive, who later co-managed Michael Jackson's estate, John McClain, who purchased the studio and restored many of the details Marvin had originally included, saving it from being turned into a photo lab. Since then, artists including Prince, Michael Jackson, Luther Vandross, Mary J. Blige, Usher, Mariah Carey, Lenny Kravitz, and Drake have recorded there (with Drake naming his song "Marvins Room" in honor of the studio where it was recorded). The studio still operates as Marvin's Room, while the owners of Eldorado Studios have moved their operation to the Burbank area of the city.
