= Leon Ware =

American singer and songwriter (1940–2017)

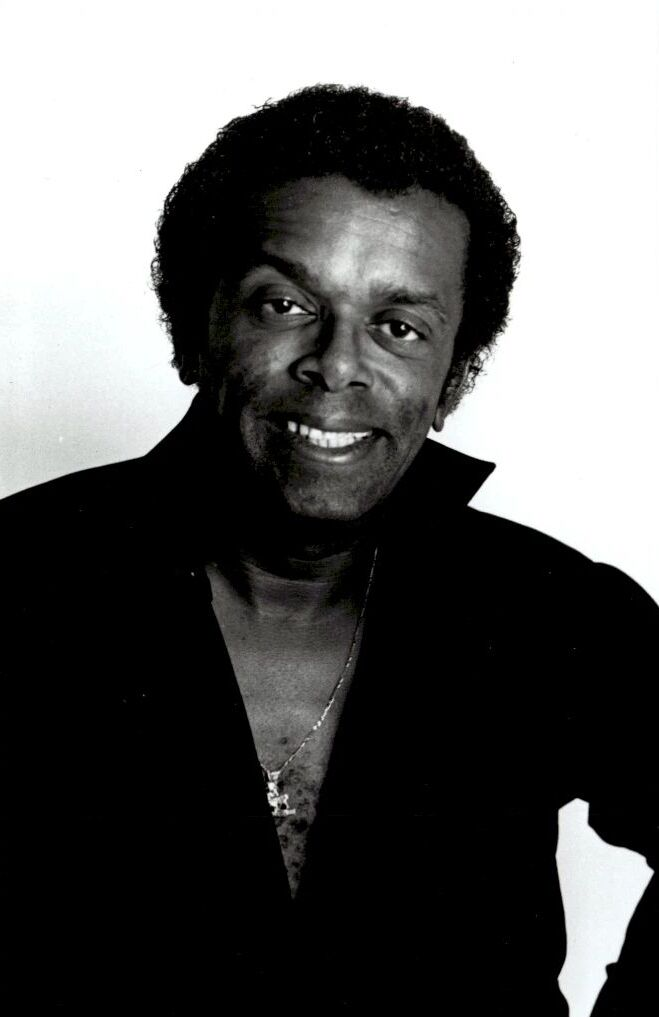
- Ware in 1982

Background information
- Born: February 16, 1940; Detroit, Michigan, U.S.
- Died: February 23, 2017 (aged 77) Marina del Rey, California, U.S.
- Genres: R&B; soul; disco; funk; jazz
- Occupations: Musician; songwriter; record producer
- Instruments: Vocals; piano; keyboards
- Years active: 1967–2017
- Labels: Gordy; United Artists; Fabulous; Elektra; Expansion; Stax; P-Vine
- Website: http://www.leonware.com

Leon Ware (February 16, 1940 – February 23, 2017) was an American songwriter, producer, composer, and singer renowned for his innovative and prolific compositions, particularly of R&B and soul music. He often worked behind the scenes, where he wrote and produced hits for other artists including Michael Jackson, Quincy Jones, Maxwell, Minnie Riperton and Marvin Gaye, co-producing the latter's seminal album I Want You.

== Early life ==
Ware was born and raised in Detroit, Michigan, United States. He was the youngest of eleven children. His mother, the former Vera Hill was a beautician and she served as a minister at their local Baptist church, while his father, Frank Ware, worked at the Ford Motor Company on the assembly line. At the age of five years, Ware had an accident involving a slingshot that made him temporarily blind for two years. Inevitably, he attended the Michigan School for the Blind in Lansing.

== Career ==
=== 1950s–1960s: Early career ===
During the mid-1950s, Ware became acquainted with the music industry as a key member of a vocal group, the Romeos, with Lamont Dozier and Ty Hunter, later of the Originals.

In 1960, Ware wrote half of an album for his solo output, which he never completed. By the late 60s, he began working at ABC Records as an arranger and songwriter. He later joined Motown as a staff member. During his early tenure at the company, he had co-written songs for the Isley Brothers, Martha & the Vandellas, and the Jackson 5. His co-composition for the Isleys was his first one to achieve gold status.

=== 1970s: Major breakthroughs ===
In 1971, Ware collaborated with Ike & Tina Turner, co-writing six songs on their United Artists album 'Nuff Said. The album reached the number 21 on the Billboard R&B chart and also appeared on the Billboard 200. This led to a contract as a solo artist on United Artists where he released his self-titled debut album in 1972. Around this time, Ware began collaborating with Arthur "T-Boy" Ross, younger brother of Diana Ross. The pair penned the 1972 hit "I Wanna Be Where You Are," recorded by Michael Jackson for his album Got To Be There. The single reached number two on the R&B charts and peaked at number 16 on the Billboard Hot 100 in 1972. Ware co-wrote for numerous artists during this period including Donny Hathaway and The Miracles.

In 1974, Quincy Jones booked Ware as songwriter and performer for two songs on Jones' Body Heat album. The song "If I Ever Lose This Heaven" hit the R&B chart in September of that year and was covered by the Average White Band. Ware had worked with Minnie Riperton on Jones' album, and they collaborated again on Riperton's album Adventures in Paradise, co-writing several tracks, including the R&B hit, "Inside My Love".

In 1975, Ware and Ross worked on demos for Ware's second album, this one to be issued on Motown and also for Ross to win a deal. One of the demo recordings, "I Want You," was heard by Motown's founder Berry Gordy, who decided the song would be a good fit for Marvin Gaye. Gaye heard the other demos and decided to record much of it for his next album, I Want You, released in March 1976. Buoyed by the number one title track, the album peaked at number one on the R&B chart, reached the Top Ten of the Billboard 200 and sold over a million copies.

Having given away the material for his album, Ware began again on a solo effort for Motown's Gordy label. Motown executives insisted Ware's following album should be given to Gaye. Ware protested at their suggestion, so the company responded by barely promoting his second album, Musical Massage, released in September 1976. The album suffered commercially due to the fact, despite its excellence in quality. Riperton lent her voice on the album, sharing vocal duties on some tracks, such as "Instant Love" and "Comfort", an outtake from the recording sessions. Retrospectively, the album gained a cult following among soul music fans that were intrigued with Ware's work and received positive reception from music critics.

When his contract with Motown ended, Ware decided to focus on writing and producing for other artists, and he wouldn't release another album until 1979. Ware released his third album, Inside Is Love, via Fabulous Records in June 1979. The album reached the charts along with its single, "What's Your Name," establishing him as a recording artist for the first time. Concurrently, he began a long-standing collaboration with Brazilian musician Marcos Valle.

=== 1980s: Subsequent career ===
In 1981, Ware signed with Elektra Records, and he released his fourth album, Rockin' You Eternally. The album spawned two R&B singles chart entries, "Baby Don't Stop Me" and the title track. The album itself did not reach the charts. Elektra financed a follow-up, and Ware released his second self-titled and overall fifth album in 1982. The company dropped him after the album didn't sell sufficient amount of copies. During this period, Ware contributhis songwriting and production input for several artists, including Shadow, and Teena Marie's 1984 album Starchild. In 1987, he released his sixth album, Undercover via his record label, Slingshot Records.

=== 1990s–2010s: Resurgence ===
In the 1990s, his earlier work became a major source of samples in hip-hop music. William Ruhlmann of AllMusic wrote, the success "didn't increase Ware's exposure as an artist, but it substantially increased his publishing income." Ware co-wrote "Independence", the comeback single of Scottish singer Lulu that became a hit in 1993.

In 1995, Ware released his seventh album, Taste the Love, on his own Kitchen Records label to help his cause. He also contributed to singer Maxwell's 1996 debut album Maxwell's Urban Hang Suite by co-writing his hit song "Sumthin' Sumthin'." The album is considered one of the landmark albums of the neo-soul genre. Throughout the 2000s, Ware continued to release several albums, such as Candlelight (2001), Love's Drippin' (2003), Deeper (2004), A Kiss in the Sand (2004), and Moon Ride (2008). In the 2010s, Ware was featured in several projects by contemporary artists Tyler, the Creator on Cherry Bomb, Theophilus London on Vibes, and Omar on Love in Beats. After two years of Ware's death, his posthumous album Rainbow Deux was released in 2019.

== Personal life ==
Ware was married four times. His second wife was the singer Susaye Greene (best known as a member of the last lineup of The Supremes), whom he married in 1974 and divorced in the same year due to Greene's familial disapprovement. He married to the former Carol Cassano in 1980 until his death. Their wedding took place on September 5, 1980 in Malibu, California.

== Illness and death ==
As of 2009, Ware was recovering from treatment for prostate cancer, and credited his friend and fellow songwriter Adrienne Anderson with directing him to appropriate medical care. He died in Marina del Rey, California, on February 23, 2017, from complications of prostate cancer. He was 77. At the time of his death, he was survived by his wife, his sons, his granddaughter, and his brothers.

== Discography ==
=== Studio albums ===
Year	Album	Chart positions		Record label
Year	Album	US	US R&B	Record label
1972	Leon Ware (1972)	—	—	United Artists
1976	Musical Massage	—	—	Gordy
1979	Inside Is Love	—	62	Fabulous
1981	Rockin' You Eternally	—	—	Elektra
1982	Leon Ware (1982)	—	—	Elektra
1987	Undercover	—	—	Sling Shot Records
1995	Taste the Love	—	—	Expansion
2001	Candlelight	—	—	Expansion
2003	Love's Drippin	—	—	P-Vine
2004	A Kiss in the Sand	—	—	Kitchen Records
2008	Moon Ride	—	—	Stax
2014	Sigh	—	—	P-Vine
2019	Rainbow Deux	—	—	Be With Records
"—" denotes the album failed to chart

=== Charted singles ===
Date	Title	US R&B
1979	What's Your Name	42
1981	Baby Don't Stop Me	66
1981	Rockin' You Eternally	74

== Songwriting credits ==
Ware wrote and co-wrote dozens of songs for various artists, some of his credits include:

- 1966: "Tell Me I'll Never Be Alone" – Martha & The Vandellas
- 1967: Souled Out – The Righteous Brothers
- 1967: "Land of Tomorrow" – Kim Weston
- 1967: "Got To Have You Back" – The Isley Brothers
- 1970: "2-4-6-8" - The Jackson 5
- 1971: 'Nuff Said – Ike & Tina Turner
- 1972: "I Wanna Be Where You Are" – Michael Jackson
- 1972: "Up In Heah" – Ike & Tina Turner
- 1972: "I Know How It Feels To Be Lonely" – Delaney & Bonnie
- 1972: "Don't Tell Me I'm Crazy" – Edwin Starr
- 1973: "Give Me Just Another Day" – The Miracles
- 1973: "Stay Away" – Valentinos
- 1973: "Able, Qualified, And Ready" – Bonnie Bramlett
- 1973: "Rolling Down A Mountainside" – Isaac Hayes
- 1973: "Euphoria" – Michael Jackson
- 1973: "It's Too Late To Change The Time" – The Jackson 5
- 1973: "Don't Say Goodbye Again" – The Jackson 5
- 1973: "I Know It's You" – Donny Hathaway
- 1974: "If I Ever Lose This Heaven" – Quincy Jones
- 1975: Adventures In Paradise – Minnie Riperton
- 1975: "If I Ever Lose This Heaven" – Nancy Wilson
- 1975: "If I Don't Love You This Way" – The Temptations
- 1975: "Git It" – Bobby Womack
- 1976: I Want You – Marvin Gaye
- 1977: "Fantasy Is Reality" – Parliament
- 1980: "Everywhere Inside Of Me" – Norman Connors
- 1980: "No Tricks" – Chuck Jackson
- 1984: "Show Me Your Magic" – Bobby King
- 1984: "My Dear Mr. Gaye" – Teena Marie
- 1986: "Love's Been Here And Gone" – James Ingram
- 1986: "You Make Me Want To (Love Again)" – Vesta Williams
- 1996: "Sumthin' Sumthin'" – Maxwell
