= Arthur Ross (musician) =

American singer-songwriter

Arthur "T-Boy" Ross (February 28, 1949 – May 30, 1996) was an American singer and songwriter most notable for his collaborations with Leon Ware. He was the younger brother of entertainer Diana Ross.

Born in Detroit, Michigan, Ross hung around rougher sections of Detroit while his elder sister garnered fame as lead singer of The Supremes in the 1960s and later solo fame in the 1970s. Shortly after Diana Ross had established herself as a solo artist, she recruited him to Motown as an appointed songwriter in the early 1970s. He collaborated with songwriter Leon Ware, and the duo wrote songs for many Motown artists. One of their first collaborations was the Top 20 hit "I Wanna Be Where You Are", which they wrote for Michael Jackson. That song has been covered by a wide range of artists, such as Dusty Springfield, The Fugees, Melissa Manchester, and Marvin Gaye, amongst others.

In 1975-1976, Ware and Ross co-produced Gaye's successful I Want You album, which featured the song by the same name. Ross had a falling-out with Ware during the recording sessions for the album. Ross set out to become a singer in his own right, eventually releasing his first (and only) album for Motown Records in 1979, Changes. Despite performances from such artists as jazz pianist Joe Sample, the album sold only 12,000 copies. Frustrated with the business, Ross retired from music in the early 1980s, returning to Detroit, where he lived in seclusion, even from family members. He subsisted on the royalties from his music career.

On June 22, 1996, police found the decaying bodies of Ross and his wife, Patricia Ann Robinson, in a basement inside a dilapidated home in Oak Park, Michigan, a Detroit suburb. The couple were, reportedly, bound and gagged and died of suffocation. The coroner later estimated that the bodies had been in the home for about three weeks. The date of the couple's deaths was estimated to be May 30, 1996. Ross was 47 years old and his wife was 54. Ross was not reported missing by his family. He had been scheduled to appear in a downtown Detroit courtroom on June 26, 1996, at a hearing on three charges of possessing a controlled substance. The man who lived in the house, Ricky Vernor Brooks, was tried for murder, but he was acquitted in June 1997.

Ross's work with Ware continues to be covered. "I Want You" has been covered by the late Robert Palmer, Madonna, Michael McDonald, and even Diana Ross herself on her 2007 album I Love You.

His sole rare album on Motown, Changes, was finally released on CD in August 2012. The album opens with his most covered song, "I Want You" and closes with another self-penned song "To The Baby", which he wrote for big sister Diana, a long-delayed tribute to her first two daughters, Rhonda Ross Kendrick and Tracee Ellis Ross.
