= I Want You (Marvin Gaye song) =

1976 single by Marvin Gaye

- French vinyl single

Single by Marvin Gaye

from the album I Want You
- B-side: "I Want You" (instrumental)
- Released: April 1, 1976
- Recorded: 1975
- Studio: Marvin's Room, Los Angeles, California
- Genre: Soul; funk; disco
- Length: 4:34 (vocal version)
- Label: Tamla
- Songwriters: Leon Ware; Arthur Ross
- Producers: Leon Ware; Arthur Ross

Marvin Gaye singles chronology
"Distant Lover (live)" (1974)	"I Want You" (1976)	"After the Dance" (1976)

Audio sample
- file; help

"I Want You" is a song written by Leon Ware and Arthur "T-Boy" Ross and performed by American singer and songwriter Marvin Gaye. It was released as a single in 1976 on his fourteenth studio album of the same name (1976) on his Tamla label. The song introduced a change in musical styles for Gaye. "I Want You", among other similar songs, gave him a disco audience. Ware, who produced the song alongside Gaye, also was attributed with the single's success.

The song stood to be one of Marvin's most popular singles during his later Motown period followed by his sabbatical following the release of 1973's Let's Get It On. The song eventually reached number one on the Hot Selling Soul Singles chart and number fifteen on the US Billboard Hot 100. It also became a disco hit, reaching number ten on the Disco Singles Chart alongside "After the Dance".

== Background ==
Originally conceived by Motown songwriter Leon Ware and his songwriting partner "T-Boy" Ross, "I Want You" was originally intended to be included in Ware's Musical Massage album. When Ware, who was also signed to the label as a solo artist, presented the outline of his album to Motown-CEO Berry Gordy, the mogul was appreciative of the songs, especially a preliminary version of "I Want You". Upon hearing it, he convinced Ware to give some of the songs to Gaye, who was coming off the release of his acclaimed 1973 record, Let's Get It On. After his final duet recording with Diana Ross and a commercially successful live album, Gaye had struggled with creating a follow-up album to Let's Get It On. When Ware played Gaye the rough version of "I Want You", Gaye, inspired by his relationship with his girlfriend Janis Hunter, was motivated to record a heartfelt performance of the song, which was about a man trying to convince a wayward lover that he wanted her to "want" him as much as he did her.

Purportedly recorded at Marvin's Room, the singer's new recording studio in Los Angeles, Gaye reportedly sang the song while lying on the back of his sofa according to Ware, who said that he couldn't see him at first but then discovered a laid-back Gaye delivering the song in his trademark tenor vocals.

== Composition ==
The song was a fusion of different genres and an unusual mix for Gaye. A blend of strings added an important factor to the soul and disco influence in "I Want You". Bongos, bell trees, and percussive congas then added a jazzy feel to the song with bass guitar notes and guitar riffs bringing an element of funk. Additional guitar (provided by Ray Parker Jr.) then added a rock element that effectively blended genres within the song.

Gaye's lead vocals brought in both a falsetto and gospel quality near the ending of the song. The single version features alternate vocal renditions. Additional vocals, later added to Gaye's deluxe edition re-issue of "I Want You", showcase two different takes by Gaye. The background vocals, all sung by Gaye, recall his early doo-wop roots. The song begins with a 77-second intro before leading into the chorus and first verse.

== Reception ==
Released a day before Marvin's 37th birthday in 1976, the single came a month after its aptly named parent album. It gained success on both the Billboard Hot 100 and Hot Soul Singles chart, it became the singer's twelfth million-selling single with Motown, eventually peaking at number fifteen on the Hot 100 and number one on the R&B chart. The single's light disco/soul approach helped the song gain a club audience after it was combined with the album's second single, "After the Dance," and peaked at number ten on the Billboard Hot Dance/Club Play chart – Gaye's first single to make it. Eventually the song would help its album sell over a million copies, and was later certified Gold by the RIAA. Gaye would also be nominated for a Grammy Award for Best R&B Male Vocal Performance, losing to Stevie Wonder's "I Wish" — the second time in three years that Wonder had beaten Gaye in that category, after Wonder's "Superstition" defeated Gaye's "Let's Get It On" in 1974.

As stated by Record World, the song "features a seductive vocal that massages a chunky trance-like rhythm" and has an "appropriately lush arrangement."

== Charts ==
Chart (1976)	Peak position
US Billboard Hot 100	15
US Hot R&B/Hip-Hop Songs (Billboard)	1

== Cover versions ==
In 1976, Argentinian tenor saxophonist Gato Barbieri covered "I Want You" on his album Caliente!. In the same year, a large personnel participated in a cover of the song from Stanley Turrentine's The Man with the Sad Face. In 1990, British singer Robert Palmer covered "I Want You" as a medley with another Marvin Gaye song, "Mercy Mercy Me". The song was released as the third single from his tenth studio album, Don't Explain, in January 1991. The song reached number nine in the United Kingdom, six in Canada and sixteen pop (and four Adult Contemporary) in the United States.

In 2003, Michael McDonald covered "I Want You" on his album Motown. In 2022, Kendrick Lamar sampled and interpolated "I Want You" on the standalone non-album single "The Heart Part 5", released prior to his album Mr. Morale & the Big Steppers. It later became available as a bonus track on the album.

=== Madonna and Massive Attack version ===
"I Want You"

Promotional single by Madonna and Massive Attack

from the album Inner City Blues: The Music of Marvin Gaye and Something to Remember
- Recorded: 1995
- Genre: Trip hop
- Length: 6:23
- Label: Motown; Maverick; Warner Bros.
- Songwriters: Leon Ware; Arthur "T-Boy" Ross
- Producer: Nellee Hooper

Music video
- "I Want You" on YouTube

==== Background ====
American singer Madonna recorded a cover version of "I Want You" with British trip-hop group Massive Attack for the Marvin Gaye tribute album Inner City Blues: The Music of Marvin Gaye (1995) and Madonna's first ballad compilation album, Something to Remember (1995). It was slated to be the first single from Something to Remember; a music video was shot and released to many media outlets, but legality problems between the Motown label and Madonna's record label prevented this from happening. Massive Attack later included the song on the special edition of their greatest hits compilation Collected in 2006.

Over a year before the release of the album Motown Records, the record label in charge of assembling the artists for the compilation album approached Massive Attack and asked them to pick a song from Marvin Gaye's back catalogue to re-imagine and suggested they do a collaboration with Chaka Khan. A backing track was made to accommodate her vocals, but the recording sessions did not go well. The possibility came up briefly of working with Aaron Neville but this fell through as well because of legality issues.

Record producer Nellee Hooper suggested Madonna as vocalist, as he had recently finished producing her 1994 Bedtime Stories album, and he set up a meeting with Massive Attack. Band members Daddy G and Mushroom never got the opportunity to meet Madonna during the recording sessions for the song, only 3D along with Hooper would meet with her in New York for a period of two days, record the vocals with her and then bring them back to their home city of Bristol to be worked on. Madonna was so impressed by the finished product that she chose to include the song as the first track on her 1995 compilation album Something to Remember.

==== Reception ====
AllMusic editor Stephen Thomas Erlewine said that "I Want You" is the most notable among the three new tracks on Something to Remember. In a review for Inner City Blues: The Music of Marvin Gaye, Erlewine also wrote "A few tracks stand out from the mire, particularly Madonna and Massive Attack's trip-hop re-interpretation of "I Want You"..." Jim Farber of the New York Daily News stated that "[Madonna] has never sounded better than in the cover of Marvin Gaye's "I Want You"." Dave Simpson from Melody Maker felt "the breathless, steam-showered, snogtastic, Massive Attack-accompanied take on Marvin Gaye's libidinal "I Want You" is irrefutably incredible." Mark Sutherland from NME praised it as "a splendid, sultry thing".

==== Music video ====
The accompanying music video for "I Want You" was shot on August 5 and 6, 1995 at Silvercup Studios in Long Island City, New York and directed by Earle Sebastian, produced by Joel Hinman, edited by Bruce Ashley, the video was inspired by and pays homage to A Telephone Call, a short story written by American writer, Dorothy Parker. The video was released to VH1 on October 2, 1995. "I Want You" received a nomination for "MTV Amour" at the MTV Europe Music Awards 1996, but lost to The Fugees's "Killing Me Softly". The video was commercially released in 2009 on Madonna's video compilation, Celebration: The Video Collection.
