= In the Groove (Marvin Gaye album) =

1968 studio album by Marvin Gaye

Studio album by Marvin Gaye
- Released: August 26, 1968
- Recorded: 1967–68
- Genre: Soul
- Length: 31:55
- Label: Tamla
- Producer: Norman Whitfield, Ivy Jo Hunter, Frank Wilson

Marvin Gaye chronology
You're All I Need (1968)	In the Groove (1968)	Marvin Gaye and His Girls (1969)

Singles from In the Groove
- 1. "You" Released: December 21, 1967; 2. "Chained" Released: August 20, 1968; 3. "I Heard It Through the Grapevine" Released: October 30, 1968

In the Groove is the eighth studio album by the American soul musician Marvin Gaye, released on August 26, 1968, on the Motown-subsidiary label Tamla Records. It was the first solo studio album Gaye released in two years, in which during that interim, the singer had emerged as a successful duet partner with female R&B singers such as Kim Weston and Tammi Terrell. In the Groove was reissued and retitled as I Heard It Through the Grapevine after the unexpected success of Gaye's recording of the same name, which had been released as a single from the original album.

== Background ==
By the end of 1967, Marvin Gaye had released only one solo single in 18 months. Between his Kim Weston duet, "It Takes Two" and his Tammi Terrell duets, "Ain't No Mountain High Enough" and "Your Precious Love" among others, Gaye had released "Your Unchanging Love", which peaked at number 33 on the Billboard Hot 100.

Motown brought Gaye back to the studio in the beginning of 1967 to record a solo album. Recording difficulties aside, Gaye's vocals went through a transition through this period. Perhaps done on purpose, Gaye's earlier collaborator Norman Whitfield and his pupil, Frank Wilson, began to write songs they felt fit the singer's chaotic personal life: Gaye's marriage to Anna Gordy was turbulent as was life on the road, such that Gaye grew to dislike live performances, His personal disagreements with Motown CEO Berry Gordy had also started to create strain in his relationship with the Motown label.

On top of that, during an October 1967 engagement at Hampden-Sydney College with Terrell, the younger Terrell collapsed from exhaustion into Gaye's waiting arms. Terrell was later diagnosed at the end of the year with a brain tumor, which depressed Gaye. Some speculate Terrell's illness and subsequent death two-and-a-half years later affected Gaye's performances in which he went from being a soul stylist in the same way his idol Sam Cooke had been into a more gospel-influenced soul vocalist who sounded more in par with Otis Redding, James Brown, and Temptations lead singer David Ruffin. However, during the recording of what would become Gaye's biggest-selling and signature single of his career, "I Heard It Through the Grapevine", Whitfield decided to force Gaye to raise his vocal register higher than what he was used to, which Whitfield already tried successfully on Ruffin during the recording of the Temptations hit, "Ain't Too Proud to Beg". Though Gaye and Whitfield reportedly argued over the sessions of "Grapevine", Whitfield was able to get what he wanted from Gaye.

When Whitfield presented "Grapevine" to Berry Gordy, the producer was stunned when Gordy turned it down sensing the song "wasn't a hit" and that "it sucked". In response, Whitfield recorded a different version of the song by Gladys Knight & the Pips in an attempt to "out-funk Aretha Franklin's "Respect". This version, released in September 1967, became the biggest Motown hit to date. After the success of Gladys Knight & the Pips' version, Whitfield was still determined to get Gaye's version of the song released as a single. Again Gordy refused but eventually agreed to allow "Grapevine" on the album.

== Release and reception ==
Professional ratings
Retrospective professional reviews
Review scores
Source	Rating
AllMusic	3/5 stars
The Rolling Stone Album Guide	(Note: This grade is assigned to the 1986 CD reissue of the original album under the retitle I Heard It Through The Grapevine!)
Tom Hull – on the Web	B+

Instead of releasing "Grapevine" as a single, Motown issued the Ivy Jo Hunter-produced "You", which was recorded after "Grapevine". The single was released in December 1967, eight months prior to the release of the album. The song showcased Gaye hollering in falsetto for the first time. The single would peak at number 34 on the Billboard Hot 100 and number 7 on the Hot-Selling Soul Singles.

In the Groove was eventually released in August 1968 accompanied by a second single, "Chained". The single would eventually peak at number 32 on the pop chart and number 8 on the R&B chart. The song was still climbing the charts when radio deejays began playing "I Heard It Through the Grapevine". When Gordy finally allowed the release of Gaye's version of "Grapevine", the song blew up on the charts upon its October 1968 release. By the end of the year, the song had hit number one on both the Hot 100 and the Hot-Selling Soul Singles charts and by 1969 had reached number one on the UK Singles chart becoming Gaye's first international smash and outselling the Gladys Knight & The Pips version of the song, thus becoming the most successful Motown single to date. However, when Gaye heard about its success, he acted coldly to it due to his depressed state over Tammi Terrell. He later told a biographer he felt the song's success was "undeserved".

After the single's commercial success, Motown re-released the album as I Heard It Through the Grapevine and, as a result, the album shot up to number 2 on the R&B albums chart and peaked at number 63 on the pop albums chart, Gaye’s biggest selling album to date. The album also marked Gaye's first attempts at producing himself in the studio with his own self-penned songs, the funky gospel dancer, "At Last I Found a Love", and the smoother "Change What You Can". Though Whitfield only produced one song on the album (producers included Ivy Jo Hunter, Ashford & Simpson and Frank Wilson), Gaye and Whitfield would embark on a two-album collaboration.

Gaye's album wasn't the only album to be re-released after a hit single: in 1970, the Miracles' Make It Happen album, initially released in 1967, was re-released in 1970 as Tears of a Clown, after that song hit number-one in the US and internationally. That same year, Diana Ross' self-titled debut album was re-released as Ain't No Mountain High Enough after that song's success.

Critical reception to In the Groove has been generally positive. According to Robert Christgau, it was an example of how "Gaye was so rhythmically and dynamically astute that his albums sustained" even during his phase as "a Motown matinee idol". Tom Hull singled out Gaye's cover of "Some Kind of Wonderful" as "nonpareil" while deeming the rest of the album "solid", although he concluded that "as a single he can't quite compete on songs you know from Motown's groups." AllMusic reviewer John Bush found it indicative of Gaye never being too dependent on Motown's Holland–Dozier–Holland songwriting-production team, as he "weathered their departure pretty well" with the album.

== Track listing ==
Side one
No.	Title	Writer(s)	Length
1.	"You"	Jeffrey Bowen, Jack Coga (Goga), Ivy Jo Hunter	2:25
2.	"Tear It on Down"	Nickolas Ashford, Valerie Simpson	2:35
3.	"Chained"	Frank Wilson	2:38
4.	"I Heard It Through the Grapevine"	Barrett Strong, Norman Whitfield	3:14
5.	"At Last (I Found a Love)"	Marvin Gaye, Anna Gordy Gaye, Elgie Stover	2:37
6.	"Some Kind of Wonderful"	Gerry Goffin, Carole King	2:19

Side two
No.	Title	Writer(s)	Length
1.	"Loving You Is Sweeter Than Ever"	Ivy Jo Hunter, Stevie Wonder	2:43
2.	"Change What You Can"	Marvin Gaye, Anna Gordy Gaye, Elgie Stover	2:37
3.	"It's Love I Need"	Stephen Bowden, Ivy Jo Hunter	2:54
4.	"Every Now And Then"	Eddie Holland, Frank Wilson	3:06
5.	"You're What's Happening (In The World Today)"	George Gordy, Robert Gordy, Allen Story	2:19
6.	"There Goes My Baby"	Benjamin Nelson, Lover Patterson, George Treadwell	2:24

== Personnel ==
- Marvin Gaye – lead vocals
- The Andantes – background vocals (tracks: 2, 4, 7, 8, 9, 10, and 11)
- The Originals – background vocals (tracks: 2, 3, 7, 9, and 10)
- Gladys Knight & The Pips – background vocals (tracks: 1 and 5)
- Telma Hopkins – background vocals (tracks: 6 and 12)
- Joyce Vincent Wilson – background vocals (tracks: 6 and 12)
- Pamela Vincent – background vocals (tracks: 6 and 12)
- The Funk Brothers – instrumentation
- Detroit Symphony Orchestra – instrumentation
- Norman Whitfield – producer
- Ivy Jo Hunter – producer
- Frank Wilson – producer

== Charts ==
Chart (1968)	Peak position
US Billboard Top LPs	63
US Billboard Soul LPs	2

== Certifications ==
Certifications for I Heard It Through the Grapevine
Region	Certification	Certified units/sales
United Kingdom (BPI)	Gold	100,000^{*}
^{*} Sales figures based on certification alone.
