= Greatest Hits, Vol. 2 (Marvin Gaye album) =

Compilation album by Marvin Gaye

Greatest hits album by Marvin Gaye
- Released: 1967
- Recorded: 1964–1965
- Genres: R&B, soul
- Labels: Tamla; T278
- Producers: Smokey Robinson, Berry Gordy, Brian Holland, Lamont Dozier, William "Mickey" Stevenson

Marvin Gaye chronology
United (1967)	Greatest Hits, Vol. 2 (1967)	You're All I Need (1968)

Marvin Gaye's Greatest Hits, Vol. 2 is a compilation album of greatest hits, a second compilation by American R&B/soul singer Marvin Gaye, released on the Tamla label in 1967. This album focused on the singer's best hits from 1964 to 1966 including signature hits "How Sweet It Is (To Be Loved By You)" and "Ain't That Peculiar".

== Track listing ==
=== Side one ===
1. "Try It Baby" (Berry Gordy)
2. "Baby Don't You Do It" (Brian Holland-Lamont Dozier-Eddie Holland)
3. "How Sweet It Is (To Be Loved by You)" (Holland-Dozier-Holland)
4. "I'll Be Doggone" (Smokey Robinson, Pete Moore, Marv Tarplin)
5. "Pretty Little Baby" (Mickey Stevenson, Ivy Jo Hunter)
6. "Ain't That Peculiar" (Robinson, Moore, Tarplin, Bobby Rogers)

=== Side two ===
1. "One More Heartache" (Robinson, Moore, Tarplin, Rogers, Ronnie White)
2. "Take This Heart of Mine" (Robinson, Tarplin, Moore)
3. "Little Darling I Need You" (Robinson, Moore)
4. "Forever" (Holland–Dozier–Freddie Gorman)
5. "Hey Diddle Diddle"
6. "Your Unchanging Love" (Holland-Dozier-Holland)

== Personnel ==
- Lead vocals by Marvin Gaye
- Background vocals by The Andantes (side 1, tracks 2–6; side 2, tracks 1–3, 5–6), The Spinners (side 2, track 5), The Temptations (side 1, track 1), and The Miracles (side 1, track 4)
- Instrumentation by The Funk Brothers
