= What Good Am I Without You =

Single by Marvin Gaye and Kim Weston

from the album Take Two
- B-side: "I Want You 'Round"
- Released: September 30, 1964
- Recorded: May 10, July 10 & September 11, 1964
- Studio: Hitsville USA, Detroit, Michigan
- Genre: Rhythm and blues
- Label: Tamla 54104
- Songwriter(s): William "Mickey" Stevenson, Alphonso Higdon
- Producer(s): William "Mickey" Stevenson

Marvin Gaye singles chronology
"Baby Don't You Do It" (1964)	"What Good Am I Without You" (1964)	"How Sweet It Is (to Be Loved by You)" (1964)

Kim Weston singles chronology
"Love Me All the Way" (1963)	"What Good Am I Without You" (1964)	"Take Me in Your Arms (Rock Me a Little While)" (1965)

"What Good Am I Without You" is a Motown duet between singers Marvin Gaye and Kim Weston. The song was released as a single in late 1964 and became the first duet Marvin and Kim recorded, a couple of years before the duo recorded the breakthrough hit, "It Takes Two". The song came after the departure of Mary Wells, who had left Motown that year shortly after releasing a successful duet album with Gaye. The single was featured on Gaye and Weston's only LP together, Take Two and peaked at number 61 on the Billboard Hot 100 (and number 28 on the Cashbox R&B chart) when it was released. The single was co-written and produced by William "Mickey" Stevenson. The b-side, "I Want You 'Round", was also included on Take Two.

According to Billboard, the "lyrics carry great tale and story is well told by [the] duo to powerful rock beat."

== Credits ==
- Lead vocals by Marvin Gaye and Kim Weston
- Background vocals by The Andantes: Marlene Barrow, Jackie Hicks and Louvain Demps
- Produced by William "Mickey" Stevenson
- Instrumentation by The Funk Brothers
