= The House I Live In (1945 film) =

1945 film by Mervyn LeRoy

- Theatrical release poster
- Directed by: Mervyn LeRoy (uncredited)
- Written by: Albert Maltz
- Produced by: Frank Ross; Mervyn LeRoy
- Starring: Frank Sinatra
- Cinematography: Robert De Grasse
- Edited by: Philip Martin
- Music by: Earl Robinson (music); Abel Meeropol (lyrics)
- Distributed by: RKO Radio Pictures
- Release date: November 9, 1945
- Running time: 10 minutes
- Country: United States
- Language: English

The House I Live In is a ten-minute short film written by Albert Maltz, produced by Frank Ross and Mervyn LeRoy, and starring Frank Sinatra. Made to oppose anti-Semitism at the end of World War II, it received an Honorary Academy Award and a special Golden Globe Award in 1946.

In 2007, this film was selected for preservation in the United States National Film Registry by the Library of Congress as being "culturally, historically, or aesthetically significant". It is also in the public domain.

== Plot ==
Sinatra, after a recording session where he sings "If You Are But a Dream", takes a break and steps outside to smoke a cigarette. While outside, Sinatra sees more than ten boys chasing a dark-haired boy and intervenes, first with dialogue, then with a short speech. His main points are that we are "all" Americans and that one American's blood is as good as another's.

== Cast ==
- Frank Sinatra as himself
- Freddie Chapman as Boy in Gang (uncredited)
- Vincent Graeff as Boy in Gang (uncredited)
- Teddy Infuhr as Boy in Gang (uncredited)
- Harry McKim as Boy in Gang (uncredited)
- Ronnie Ralph as Jewish Boy (uncredited)
- Merrill Rodin as Boy in Gang (uncredited)
- Axel Stordahl as Axel Stordahl - Orchestra Conductor (uncredited)

== Title song ==
The House I Live In

The song originally appeared in the musical revue Let Freedom Sing, which opened on Broadway on October 5, 1942. Brooks Atkinson wrote in The New York Times: "Although Mordecai Bauman does not sing it particularly well, he sings it with earnest sincerity, without feeling that he must imitate youth by blasting the voice amplifying system and cutting a rug." In the film, Sinatra sings the title song. His recording became a national hit. The music was written by Earl Robinson. Robinson was later blacklisted during the McCarthy era for being a member of the Communist Party. He also wrote campaign songs for the presidential campaigns of Franklin D. Roosevelt, Henry A. Wallace, and, in 1984, Jesse Jackson. The lyrics were written in 1943 by Abel Meeropol under the pen name Lewis Allan. In 1957, Meeropol adopted two boys, Michael and Robert, who had been orphaned when their parents Julius and Ethel Rosenberg were executed in 1953. Meeropol was enraged that the second verse of the song was not used in the film. When the film premiered, he protested against the deletion of the verse referring to "my neighbors white and black".

The song was covered in later years by Paul Robeson, Mahalia Jackson, and Josh White. Sam Cooke also covered it. Kim Weston included it on her second post-Motown album This Is America (1968). Sinatra continued to include it in his repertory for decades. He performed it at the 1961 inaugural ceremonies for John F. Kennedy, during a state dinner at the White House during the Nixon administration, at the 1985 inaugural ceremonies of Ronald Reagan, and at the ceremony marking the centenary of the Statue of Liberty that same year. Bill Cosby used a recording of the song to open some of his shows in 2002.

The song figures prominently in Arch Oboler's radio play The House I Live In, which aired on April 26, 1945. It was sung by Hope Foye.

== See also ==
- Don't Be a Sucker
