= If This World Were Mine =

1967 single by Marvin Gaye and Tammi Terrell

Single by Marvin Gaye and Tammi Terrell

from the album United
- A-side: "If I Could Build My Whole World Around You"
- Released: November 14, 1967
- Recorded: 1967
- Studio: Hitsville U.S.A.
- Genre: R&B; soul
- Length: 2:41
- Label: Tamla
- Songwriter: Marvin Gaye
- Producers: Harvey Fuqua; Johnny Bristol

Marvin Gaye and Tammi Terrell singles chronology
"Your Precious Love" (1967)	"If This World Were Mine" (1967)	"Ain't Nothing Like the Real Thing" (1968)

Marvin Gaye singles chronology
"Your Precious Love" (1967)	"If I Could Build My Whole World Around You/If This World Were Mine" (1967)	"You" (1967)

Tammi Terrell singles chronology
"Your Precious Love" (1967)	"If I Could Build My Whole World Around You/If This World Were Mine" (1967)	"Ain't Nothing Like the Real Thing" (1968)

"If This World Were Mine" is a 1967 song by soul duo Marvin Gaye and Tammi Terrell from their album United. Written solely by Gaye, it was one of the few songs they recorded without Ashford & Simpson writing or producing. When it was released as a single in November 1967 as the B-side to the duo's "If I Could Build My Whole World Around You", it hit the Billboard pop singles chart, peaking at number 68, and peaked at number 27 on the Billboard R&B singles chart. Gaye would later put the song into his set list during his last tours in the early 1980s as he performed a medley of his hits with Terrell.

== Charts ==
Chart (1967)	Peak
U.S. Billboard Hot 100	68
U.S. Billboard Hot R&B Singles	27

== Cover versions ==
=== Luther Vandross and Cheryl Lynn version ===
"If This World Were Mine"

Single by Luther Vandross and Cheryl Lynn

from the album Instant Love
- Released: September 4, 1982
- Recorded: 1982
- Genre: R&B, soul, quiet storm
- Length: 5:27
- Label: Columbia
- Songwriter: Marvin Gaye
- Producers: Luther Vandross; Marcus Miller

Cheryl Lynn singles chronology
"Instant Love" (1982)	"If This World Were Mine" (1982)	"Look Before You Leap" (1983)

Luther Vandross singles chronology
"Don't You Know That?" (1981)	"If This World Were Mine" (1982)	"Bad Boy/Having a Party" (1982)

Fifteen years after the original recording, Luther Vandross and Cheryl Lynn re-recorded it for her album Instant Love and made the song a hit peaking at number four on the Billboard Hot Soul Singles chart on October 16, 1982. This version also appeared on Vandross's 1989 compilation album, The Best of Luther Vandross... The Best of Love.

==== Personnel ====
- Cheryl Lynn – lead vocals
- Luther Vandross – lead vocals, arrangements
- Nat Adderley Jr. – keyboards, arrangements
- Doc Powell – guitar
- Marcus Miller – bass
- Yogi Horton – drums
- Crusher Bennett – percussion

==== Charts ====
Chart (1982–1983)	Peak
U.S. Billboard Black Singles	4

=== Other versions ===
In 1972, soul vocal trio Love Unlimited released a cover on their debut album From a Girl's Point of View We Give to You... Love Unlimited.

In 1973, Jerry Butler and Brenda Lee Eager recorded the song on their album The Love We Have, the Love We Had.

In 1999, Coko of SWV and rising R&B singer Tyrese recorded it for her solo album Hot Coko. The song is featured on John Legend's 2004 live album Solo Sessions Vol. 1: Live at the Knitting Factory, with Imani Uzuri singing the female lead.

In 2005, Alicia Keys and Jermaine Paul recorded it for the Luther Vandross tribute album So Amazing: An All-Star Tribute to Luther Vandross. The song was nominated for Best R&B Performance by a Duo or Group with Vocals at the Grammy Awards. They did not win; instead, the Grammy was awarded to Beyoncé Knowles and Stevie Wonder for their cover "So Amazing", which appeared on the same Vandross tribute album.

== Sampling ==
R&B singer Tweet sampled the Gaye/Terrell original for the intro of her 2005 single "Turn da Lights Off", featuring Missy Elliott.

In 2013, American house producer Chris Malinchak sampled the song on "So Good to Me".

The Vandross/Lynn version was sampled in "Luther", a ballad with SZA, off of Kendrick Lamar's 2024 album GNX.
