= United (Marvin Gaye and Tammi Terrell album) =

Studio album by Marvin Gaye & Tammi Terrell
- Released: August 29, 1967
- Recorded: December 1966 – June 15, 1967
- Studio: Hitsville USA, Detroit
- Genre: Soul
- Length: 33:36
- Label: Tamla
- Producer: Harvey Fuqua; Johnny Bristol; Hal Davis; Berry Gordy, Jr.

Marvin Gaye & Tammi Terrell chronology
| United (1967) | You're All I Need (1968) |

Marvin Gaye chronology
| Take Two (1966) | United (1967) | Greatest Hits, Vol. 2 (1967) |

Tammi Terrell chronology
| The Early Show (1967) | United (1967) | You're All I Need (1968) |

Singles from United
- 1. "Ain't No Mountain High Enough" Released: April 20, 1967; 2. "Your Precious Love" Released: August 22, 1967; 3. "If I Could Build My Whole World Around You" / "If This World Were Mine" Released: November 14, 1967

Professional ratings
Review scores
| Source | Rating |
|---|---|
| AllMusic | 4.5/5 stars |

United is a studio album by the soul musicians Marvin Gaye and Tammi Terrell, released August 29, 1967, on the Motown-subsidiary label Tamla Records. Harvey Fuqua and Johnny Bristol produced all of the tracks on the album, with the exception of "You Got What It Takes" (produced by Motown CEO Berry Gordy, Jr.) and "Oh How I'd Miss You" (produced by Hal Davis). Fuqua and Bristol produced "Hold Me Oh My Darling" and "Two Can Have a Party" as Terrell solo tracks in 1965 and 1966, and had Gaye overdub his vocals to them in order to create duet versions of the songs.

United was the duo's as well as Gaye's most successful album of the 1960s with sales almost reaching one million copies, it yielded four Top 100 Billboard chart hits, including the two Top 10 singles "Your Precious Love," "If I Could Build My Whole World Around You," the Top 20 single, "Ain't No Mountain High Enough" and "If This World Were Mine". United peaked at number 69 on the U.S. Billboard 200 album chart and number 7 on the U.S. Billboard R&B albums chart upon its release. The album was the first of three collaborative albums by Gaye and Terrell.

Gaye and Terrell's first session together was in December 1966, when they recorded "Ain't No Mountain High Enough". They recorded numerous tracks together at Motown's Hitsville USA Studio A in Detroit; work on United concluded on June 15, 1967.

== Track listing ==
Side one

1. "Ain't No Mountain High Enough" (Nickolas Ashford, Valerie Simpson) – 2:32
2. "You Got What It Takes" (Berry Gordy, Jr., Gwen Gordy, Tyran Carlo) – 2:59
3. "If I Could Build My Whole World Around You" (Harvey Fuqua, Johnny Bristol, Vernon Bullock) – 2:26
4. "Somethin' Stupid" (C. Carson Parks) – 2:46
5. "Your Precious Love" (Ashford, Simpson) – 3:07
6. "Hold Me Oh My Darling" (Harvey Fuqua) – 2:50

Side two

1. "Two Can Have a Party" (Johnny Bristol, Fuqua, Thomas Kemp) – 2:19
2. "Little Ole Boy, Little Ole Girl" (Fuqua, Etta James, Brook Benton) – 2:46
3. "If This World Were Mine" (Marvin Gaye) – 2:46
4. "Sad Wedding" (Bristol, Jackey Beavers) – 3:27
5. "Give a Little Love" (Bristol, Fuqua, Clyde Wilson) – 3:01
6. "Oh How I'd Miss You" (Hal Davis, Frank Wilson, Vance Wilson) – 2:37

== Charts ==
| Chart (1967) | Peak position |
|---|---|
| US Billboard 200 | 69 |
| US Top R&B/Hip-Hop Albums (Billboard) | 7 |

== Certifications ==
| Region | Certification | Certified units/sales |
|---|---|---|
| United States (RIAA) | Gold | 500,000^{‡} |
^{‡} Sales+streaming figures based on certification alone.

== Personnel ==
- Lead vocals: Marvin Gaye, Tammi Terrell
- Background vocals: Marvin Gaye, Tammi Terrell, Harvey Fuqua, Johnny Bristol, The Originals, The Andantes, The Spinners
- Production: Harvey Fuqua, Johnny Bristol, Hal Davis, Berry Gordy, Jr.
- Instrumentation: The Funk Brothers (uncredited)

== Notes ==
=== Sources ===
- Gaye, Frankie (2003). Marvin Gaye, My Brother. Milwaukee: Hal Leonard Corporation. ISBN 978-1-61774-498-3 – via the Internet Archive.
