= Moods of Marvin Gaye =

1966 studio album by Marvin Gaye

Studio album by Marvin Gaye
- Released: May 23, 1966
- Recorded: Hitsville U.S.A., Detroit
- Genre: Soul
- Length: 36:12
- Label: Tamla
- Producer: Smokey Robinson; Brian Holland; Lamont Dozier; Clarence Paul

Marvin Gaye chronology
A Tribute to the Great Nat King Cole (1966)	Moods of Marvin Gaye (1966)	Take Two (1966)

Singles from Moods of Marvin Gaye
- 1. "I'll Be Doggone" Released: February 26, 1965; 2. "Ain't That Peculiar" Released: September 14, 1965; 3. "One More Heartache" Released: January 31, 1966; 4. "Take This Heart of Mine" Released: May 5, 1966; 5. "Little Darling (I Need You)" Released: July 26, 1966; 6. "Your Unchanging Love" Released: June 13, 1967

Moods of Marvin Gaye is the seventh studio album by Marvin Gaye, released on the Tamla label in 1966.

The album was the result of a plan to establish Gaye as a strong album-oriented artist as well as a hit maker. Gaye was still uncomfortable with performing strictly R&B and had begun work on a standards album around this time, after meeting musician Bobby Scott. However, the sessions were unsuccessful and he would successfully complete a standards album only in his later years (released posthumously as Vulnerable in 1997). For the time being, Gaye was winning more fans and had become a crossover teen idol.

Six songs from Moods of Marvin Gaye were released as singles, all of which reached the Top 40 on the R&B singles chart. Four singles reached the Top 40 on the Pop Singles Chart.

Gaye also scored his first two No. 1 R&B singles, "I'll Be Doggone" and "Ain't That Peculiar", both co-written by Gaye's friend, Berry Gordy's right-hand man Smokey Robinson.

Professional ratings
Review scores
Source	Rating
AllMusic	4/5 stars

== Track listing ==
Side One
No.	Title	Writer(s)	Length
1.	"I'll Be Doggone"	Warren Moore, Smokey Robinson, Marvin Tarplin	2:47
2.	"Little Darling (I Need You)"	Holland–Dozier–Holland	2:35
3.	"Take This Heart of Mine"	Moore, Robinson, Tarplin	2:49
4.	"Hey Diddle Diddle"	Johnny Bristol, Harvey Fuqua, Gaye	2:30
5.	"One More Heartache"	Moore, Robinson, Bobby Rogers, Tarplin, Ronald White	2:42
6.	"Ain't That Peculiar"	Moore, Robinson, Rogers, Tarplin	3:00

Side Two
No.	Title	Writer(s)	Length
1.	"Night Life"	Walt Breeland, Paul Buskirk, Willie Nelson	3:05
2.	"You've Been a Long Time Coming"	Holland-Dozier-Holland	2:13
3.	"Your Unchanging Love"	Holland-Dozier-Holland	3:13
4.	"You're the One For Me"	Morris Broadnax, Clarence Paul, Stevie Wonder	3:24
5.	"I Worry 'Bout You"	Norman Mapp	3:24
6.	"One for My Baby (and One More for the Road)"	Harold Arlen, Johnny Mercer	4:30

== Personnel ==
- Marvin Gaye - lead vocals
- The Andantes - backing vocals (all of side 1; side 2, tracks 8–10)
- The Miracles - additional backing vocals (on "I'll Be Doggone")
- The Spinners - backing vocals (on "Hey Diddle Diddle")
- Marv Tarplin - guitar (side 1, tracks 1, 3, 5 and 6)
- The Funk Brothers - instrumentation
