= If I Could Build My Whole World Around You =

1967 single by Marvin Gaye and Tammi Terrell

Single by Marvin Gaye & Tammi Terrell

from the album United
- B-side: "If This World Were Mine"
- Released: November 14, 1967
- Recorded: Hitsville USA; March 16 & 21, 1967
- Genre: Soul, pop
- Length: 2:26
- Label: Tamla; 54161
- Songwriters: Harvey Fuqua; Johnny Bristol; Vernon Bullock
- Producers: Harvey Fuqua; Johnny Bristol

Marvin Gaye & Tammi Terrell singles chronology
"Your Precious Love" (1967)	"If I Could Build My Whole World Around You" (1967)	"Ain't Nothing Like the Real Thing" (1968)

Marvin Gaye singles chronology
"Your Precious Love" (1967)	"If I Could Build My Whole World Around You/If This World Were Mine" (1967)	"You" (1967)

Tammi Terrell singles chronology
"Your Precious Love" (1967)	"If I Could Build My Whole World Around You/If This World Were Mine" (1967)	"Ain't Nothing Like the Real Thing" (1968)

"If I Could Build My Whole World Around You" is a popular song recorded by Marvin Gaye and Tammi Terrell in 1967 and released in November 14, 1967. Written by Harvey Fuqua, Johnny Bristol, and Vernon Bullock, the single was Gaye & Terrell's third single together and the second to go Top Ten on both the Pop and R&B charts of Billboard, peaking at number ten and number two, respectively.

== Background ==
The duo's vocals go back and forth as they described what could be if either was able to "build a world" around their loved one. It was one of few songs that set the duo apart from other R&B duos of the time. In time, this song among other legendary duets by the two soul icons would become the landmark for R&B duets to this day. The song was also one of the few songs that was written by someone other than Ashford & Simpson, who had written several hit songs for the duo.

Billboard described the single as a "groovy blues item headed right for a choice spot on the top 100" with a "powerful vocal performance by the duet." Cash Box said that "vocal performances with enough power to make the side are highlighted by some wonderful lively arrangements."

== Personnel ==
- All vocals by Marvin Gaye and Tammi Terrell
- Instrumentation by The Funk Brothers

== Chart performance ==
Chart (1967–68)	Peak position
UK Singles (The Official Charts Company)	41
US Billboard Hot 100	10
US Best Selling R&B Singles (Billboard)	2
