= You (Marvin Gaye song) =

Single by Marvin Gaye

from the album In the Groove/I Heard It Through the Grapevine
- B-side: "Change What You Can"
- Released: December 21, 1967
- Recorded: April 14; May 23; June 23 & 26; September 11, 1967
- Genre: Soul
- Length: 2:25
- Label: Tamla
- Songwriters: Ivy Jo Hunter; Jack Goga; Jeffrey Bowen
- Producer: Ivy Jo Hunter

Marvin Gaye singles chronology
"If I Could Build My Whole World Around You/If This World Were Mine" (1967)	"You" (1967)	"Ain't Nothing Like the Real Thing" (1968)

"You" is a 1967 single released by American singer Marvin Gaye on the Tamla label.

== Background ==
Released as the first single from Gaye's In the Groove album, it was written by Ivy Jo Hunter, Jack Goga and Jeffrey Bowen and produced by Hunter.

The song talked of a man wanting to keep a rendezvous secret with one woman due to their differing social statuses, Marvin's narrator being working class, while the woman is upper class.

Recorded after Gaye recorded his "I Heard It Through the Grapevine" single, it showcased a new rougher Gaye vocal than usual signaling a change in the singer's direction as he stepped away from the sophisticated-styled soul that dominated his mid-sixties releases.

A modest hit on the pop charts peaking at number thirty-four, it was a top ten single on the R&B charts where it peaked at number seven.

Cash Box said that it has "tremendous rhythmic impact and a big vocal showing."

== Chart performance ==
Chart (1968)	Peak position
US Billboard Hot 100	34
US Best Selling R&B Singles (Billboard)	7

== Personnel ==
- Lead vocals by Marvin Gaye
- Background vocals by Gladys Knight & the Pips
- Instrumentation by the Funk Brothers

== Other versions ==
- A jazz instrumental cover of the song, titled "You, Baby", was released by Nat Adderley on his 1968 album of the same name.
- Three Dog Night released a version of the song on their 1971 album, Harmony.
- Rare Earth recorded this song. It appears on the second volume of Anthology: The Best of Rare Earth.
- Judie Tzuke recorded the song for her 1985 album The Cat Is Out.
