= For the First Time (Kim Weston album) =

Studio album by Kim Weston
- Released: 1967
- Genre: Pop, R&B
- Label: MGM
- Producer: William "Mickey" Stevenson

Kim Weston chronology
Take Two (1965)	For the First Time (1967)	This Is America (1968)

For the First Time is a studio album by Kim Weston, recorded after her departure from Motown Records. She had previously recorded an album with Marvin Gaye, so this album is her first true solo album. The album was arranged by Wade Marcus, Slide Hampton, Larry Wilcox, Melba Liston and Tad Jones.

== Track listing ==
Side one
No.	Title	Writer(s)	Length
1.	"Where Am I Going?"	Cy Coleman, Dorothy Fields	2:55
2.	"Free Again"	Harold Levey	3:52
3.	"Everything in the World I Love"	Herbert Martin, Michael Leonard	3:09
4.	"When the Sun Comes Out"	Mort Shuman, Clive Westlake	2:49
5.	"Walking Happy"	Jimmy Van Heusen, Sammy Cahn	2:50

Side two
No.	Title	Writer(s)	Length
1.	"The Beat Goes On"	Sonny Bono	3:13
2.	"In the Dark"	Lil Green	3:25
3.	"If You Go Away"	Rod McKuen, Jacques Brel	3:43
4.	"Come Rain or Come Shine"	Harold Arlen, Johnny Mercer	2:20
5.	"Come Back to Me"	Alan Jay Lerner, Burton Lane	3:01
6.	"That's Life"	Kelly Gordon, Dean Kermit Thompson	3:22

== Personnel ==
- Mickey Stevenson, Jr. - producer
- Val Valentin - director of engineering
- Acy R. Lehman - cover design
- Chuck Stewart - cover photograph
- Wade Marcus - arranger ("Where Am I Going?" and "Come Back to Me")
- Slide Hampton - arranger ("Free Again," "The Beat Goes On," "If You Go Away" and "That's Life")
- Larry Wilcox - arranger ("Everything in the World I Love")
- Melba Liston - arranger ("When the Sun Comes Out", "In the Dark" and "Come Rain or Come Shine")
- Tad Jones - arranger ("Walking Happy")
