= Take Two (Marvin Gaye and Kim Weston album) =

Studio album by Marvin Gaye and Kim Weston
- Released: August 25, 1966
- Studio: Hitsville USA, Detroit
- Genre: R&B, soul
- Length: 34:15
- Label: Tamla; T270
- Producer: Harvey Fuqua; William "Mickey" Stevenson

Marvin Gaye chronology
| Moods of Marvin Gaye (1966) | Take Two (1966) | United (1967) |

Kim Weston chronology
| Take Two (1966) | For the First Time (1967) |

Singles from Take Two
- 1. "What Good Am I Without You / I Want You 'Round" Released: September 30, 1964; 2. "It Takes Two" Released: May 12, 1966

Professional ratings
Review scores
| Source | Rating |
|---|---|
| AllMusic | 4/5 stars |
| The Encyclopedia of Popular Music | 3/5 stars |

Take Two is a duet album by the Motown label mates Marvin Gaye and Kim Weston, released August 25, 1966, on the Motown's Tamla label. The album was titled after its most successful selection, the Top 5 R&B/Top 20 Pop hit "It Takes Two", which was to this point Gaye's most successful duet with another singer. The album also featured the modest hit "What Good Am I Without You?".

Shortly after this album was released, Weston left Motown in a dispute over royalties (coincidentally, Mary Wells had departed from Motown two years prior after also recording a duets album - Together - with Gaye). Weston's replacement as Gaye's duet partner was Tammi Terrell, who recorded several successful hit singles with Gaye during the late 1960s.

== Track listing ==
=== Side one ===
1. "It Takes Two" (Sylvia Moy, William "Mickey" Stevenson) - 3:00
2. "I Love You, Yes I Do" (Henry Glover, Sally Nix) - 2:22
3. "Baby I Need Your Loving" (Holland-Dozier-Holland) - 3:14
4. "It's Got to Be a Miracle (This Thing Called Love)" (Vernon Bullock, Moy, Stevenson) - 3:31
5. "Baby Say Yes" (Stevenson, Kim Weston) - 3:16
6. "What Good Am I Without You" (Alphonso Higdon, Stevenson) - 2:55

=== Side two ===
7. "'Til There Was You" (Meredith Willson) - 2:28
8. "Love Fell on Me" (Moy, Stevenson) - 2:29
9. "Secret Love" (Sammy Fain, Paul Francis Webster) - 2:48
10. "I Want You 'Round" (William "Smokey" Robinson, Stevenson) - 2:27
11. "Heaven Sent You, I Know" (Bullock, Moy, Stevenson) - 3:05
12. "When We're Together" (Bullock, Moy) - 2:40

== Personnel ==
- Marvin Gaye - vocals
- Kim Weston - vocals
- The Andantes - backing vocals (tracks 2, 3, 5, 6, 8, 11, 12)
- The Spinners - backing vocals (track 10)
- The Funk Brothers - instrumentation
