= This Is America (album) =

1968 studio album by Kim Weston

Studio album by Kim Weston
- Released: 1968
- Genre: Pop
- Label: MGM
- Producer: William "Mickey" Stevenson

Kim Weston chronology
For the First Time (1967)	This Is America (1968)	Big Brass Four Poster (1970)

This Is America is the third studio album (and second solo album) by Kim Weston. Released in 1968, the album focuses on the theme of patriotism. It is well known for its recording of "Lift Every Voice and Sing", later released as a single.

== Track listing ==
=== Side one ===
1. "This Is America" (Beth Beatty, Ernie Shelby)
2. "When Johnny Comes Marching Home" (Arranged and adapted by Marty Paich)
3. "If I Ruled the World" (Cyril Ornadel, Leslie Bricusse)
4. "The Impossible Dream (The Quest)" (Joe Darion, Mitch Leigh)
5. "Born Free" (Don Black, John Barry)
6. "Somewhere" (Leonard Bernstein, Stephen Sondheim)

=== Side two ===
1. "The Exodus Song" (Ernest Gold, Pat Boone)
2. "People" (Bob Merrill, Jule Styne)
3. "Touch the Earth" (Gail Allen, Jeri Southern)
4. "Lift Ev'ry Voice and Sing" (James Weldon Johnson, John Rosamond Johnson)
5. "The House I Live In" (Earl Robinson, Lewis Allan)
6. "This Is My Country" (Al Jacobs, Don Raye)

== Personnel ==
- Marty Paich - arrangements
- Val Valentin - director of engineering
- Tom Nixon - recording supervisor
- Acy R. Lehman - art direction
- John Sposato - cover art
