= Ain't That Peculiar =

1965 single by Marvin Gaye

Single by Marvin Gaye

from the album Moods of Marvin Gaye
- B-side: "She's Got to Be Real"
- Released: September 14, 1965
- Recorded: May 5 & 12, 1965
- Studio: Hitsville, USA, Detroit
- Genre: Soul, pop, R&B
- Length: 2:50
- Label: Tamla
- Songwriters: Pete Moore, William "Smokey" Robinson, Bobby Rogers, Marv Tarplin
- Producer: Smokey Robinson

Marvin Gaye singles chronology
| "Pretty Little Baby" (1965) | "Ain't That Peculiar" (1965) | "One More Heartache" (1966) |

"Ain't That Peculiar" is a 1965 song recorded by the American soul musician Marvin Gaye for the Tamla (Motown) label.

== Background ==
The single was produced by Smokey Robinson, and written by Robinson, and fellow Miracles members Bobby Rogers, Pete Moore, and Marv Tarplin. "Ain't That Peculiar" features Gaye, with the Andantes on backing vocals, singing about the torment of a painful relationship.

Billboard said that "penetrating hard-drive dance beat backs another soulful, first-rate Gaye performance." Cash Box described it as a "rollicking, rhythmic pop-blues romantic handclapper about a love-struck fella who can't get along without his gal." Record World said that "The Detroit beat gets going in high speed on this marvy Gaye slice."

== Chart success ==
The single was Gaye's second U.S. million seller successfully duplicating its predecessor "I'll Be Doggone", from earlier in 1965 by topping Billboard's Hot R&B Singles chart in the fall of 1965, peaking at number 8 on the Billboard Hot 100. It became one of Gaye's signature 1960s recordings, and was his best-known solo hit before 1968's "I Heard It Through the Grapevine".

== Diamond Reo version ==
"Ain't That Peculiar"

Single by Diamond Reo

from the album Diamond Reo
- B-side: "(From Here To) Infinity"
- Released: 1975
- Recorded: 1974
- Genre: hard rock, blues rock
- Length: 2:43
- Label: Big Tree Records
- Songwriters: Pete Moore, William "Smokey" Robinson, Bobby Rogers, Marv Tarplin
- Producer: David Shaffer

Hard rock band Diamond Reo from Pittsburgh, Pennsylvania released their version of "Ain't That Peculiar" in early 1975. The single peaked at No. 44 on the Billboard Hot 100 on February 8 of the same year, becoming their only hit. The Diamond Reo version is considered one of the first recordings to use the talk box.

== Other versions ==
- A cover by all-female rock band Fanny on their 1972 album Fanny Hill reached number 85 on the Billboard Hot 100.
- A cover by R&B singer Stevie Woods reached number 54 on the Billboard Hot R&B Singles chart in 1984.
- A cover by English singer Mari Wilson reached No. 78 on the UK Singles Chart in 1984.
- A cover by New Grass Revival peaked at number 53 on the Billboard Hot Country Singles chart in 1986.
- A cover by British new wave band Japan was released in 1980 as a track of their album Gentlemen Take Polaroids.

== Personnel ==
- Lead vocals by Marvin Gaye
- Background vocals by the Andantes: Marlene Barrow, Jackie Hicks and Louvain Demps
- Guitar by Marv Tarplin
- Horn arrangements by Willie Shorter
- Other instrumentation by the Funk Brothers
  - Bass by James Jamerson
  - Congas by Eddie "Bongo" Brown
  - Drums by Uriel Jones
  - Guitar by Eddie Willis and Robert White
  - Organ by Johnny Griffith
  - Piano by Earl Van Dyke
  - Tambourine by Jack Ashford
