= Take This Heart of Mine =

Single by Marvin Gaye

from the album Moods of Marvin Gaye
- Released: May 5, 1966
- Recorded: January 4, February 9 and March 24, 1966
- Studio: Hitsville USA, Detroit
- Genre: Pop, soul
- Length: 2:47
- Label: Tamla
- Songwriters: Warren "Pete" Moore; William "Smokey" Robinson; Marv Tarplin
- Producer: Smokey Robinson

Marvin Gaye singles chronology
"One More Heartache" (1966)	"Take This Heart of Mine" (1966)	"Little Darling (I Need You)" (1966)

"Take This Heart of Mine" is a song written by the American soul singer Marvin Gaye. Written by the Miracles' members Warren "Pete" Moore, William "Smokey" Robinson and Marv Tarplin, it was produced by Robinson and released as a single on Motown Records' Tamla label in May 1966.

== Background ==
Released in succession of three consecutive singles by Gaye helmed by the Miracles team from his Moods of Marvin Gaye album, the song took on a slightly different musical mix than the previous three. A little upbeat from the previous two singles, this song has the narrator describing how his love "is better than the tale of Jack and Jill" and how its prescription fills up better than a doctor's among other things. Billboard said of the song that it was an "exceptional dance beat tune with solid Detroit sound and well-written lyric [and] has more excitement than [Gaye's] previous hit, 'One More Heartache.'" Cash Box described the song as a "rollicking, rhythmic, chorus-backed pop-r&b romantic handclapper."

== Personnel ==
- Lead vocals by Marvin Gaye
- Background vocals by The Andantes
- Written by Warren "Pete" Moore, William "Smokey" Robinson and Marv Tarplin
- Produced by William "Smokey" Robinson
- Guitar by Marv Tarplin
- Other instrumentation by The Funk Brothers

== Chart performance ==
Unlike Marvin Gaye's previous three releases, "Take This Heart of Mine", fell short of reaching the pop top forty peaking at number 44 on the Billboard Hot 100 but reached number ten on the R&B singles chart making it the fourth consecutive top ten hit on Moods...

== Promotional appearances ==
In 1966, Gaye sang this song on his only appearance on The Ed Sullivan Show.
