= Your Precious Love =

Single by Marvin Gaye & Tammi Terrell

from the album United
- B-side: "Hold Me Oh My Darling"
- Released: August 22, 1967
- Recorded: March 23, 1967
- Studio: Hitsville USA, Detroit
- Genre: Soul, pop
- Length: 3:07
- Label: Tamla; T 54156
- Songwriter: Nickolas Ashford and Valerie Simpson
- Producers: Harvey Fuqua; Johnny Bristol

Marvin Gaye & Tammi Terrell singles chronology
"Ain't No Mountain High Enough" (1967)	"Your Precious Love" (1967)	"If I Could Build My Whole World Around You/If This World Were Mine" (1967)

Marvin Gaye singles chronology
"Your Unchanging Love" (1967)	"Your Precious Love" (1967)	"If I Could Build My Whole World Around You/If This World Were Mine" (1967)

Tammi Terrell singles chronology
"Ain't No Mountain High Enough" (1967)	"Your Precious Love" (1967)	"If I Could Build My Whole World Around You/If This World Were Mine" (1967)

"Your Precious Love" is a popular song that was a 1967 hit for Motown singers Marvin Gaye and Tammi Terrell. The song was written by Nickolas Ashford and Valerie Simpson, and produced by Harvey Fuqua and Johnny Bristol. The doo-wop styled recording features background vocals by Fuqua, Gaye, Terrell and Bristol, and instrumentals by the Funk Brothers with the Detroit Symphony Orchestra. The song was later sampled by Gerald Levert in the song "Your Smile" on his 2002 album, The G Spot.

Billboard described the single as "a soulful blues ballad." Billboard also felt that both "Your Precious Love" and its B-side "Hold Me Oh My Darling" had equal sales potential as the duo's previous hit single "Ain't No Mountain High Enough".

== Charts ==
=== Weekly charts ===
Chart (1967)	Peak position
Canada Top Singles (RPM)	1
US Billboard Hot 100	5
US Hot Soul Singles	2

=== Year-end charts ===
Year-end chart performance for "Your Precious Love"
Chart (1967)	Rank
US (Billboard)	32

== Other versions ==
- Johnny Mathis and Deniece Williams recorded the song (titled, incorrectly, as "Heaven Must Have Sent You", an entirely different Motown song, on some releases) for their 1978 album, That's What Friends Are For.
- Stephen Bishop and Yvonne Elliman recorded "Your Precious Love" for the soundtrack of the 1980 movie, Roadie.
- Al Jarreau and Randy Crawford performed the song live at the Montreux Jazz Festival in 1981, backed by an All-Star ensemble featuring Larry Carlton, David Sanborn and Marcus Miller and the Yellowjackets, released on Casino Lights.
- In 1984, father Neil Sedaka and daughter Dara Sedaka reached the Billboard Top 15 of the Adult Contemporary chart with their duet version of the song from the 1984 album, Come See About Me.
- Japanese pop star Seiko Matsuda recorded the song for her 1996 English language album, Was It the Future.
- A version by D'Angelo and Erykah Badu was released on the High School High soundtrack album in 1996, as well as featured on the 1999 tribute album Marvin Is 60.
- There was also an a cappella arrangement of the song by Cedric the Entertainer and Avant figures in a gag sequence in the 2004 MGM film, Barbershop 2: Back in Business.
- Another remake is the version that was recorded by Peter Cox of Go West and Easther Bennett of Eternal and appears on Cox's 2006 album Motor City Music (Curb Records).
- Sarah Connor recorded the song as an overdubbed "duet" with Marvin Gaye on her 2007 album, Soulicious.
- Fantasia Barrino included a sample of the song on "Collard Greens and Cornbread" from her 2010 album, Back to Me.
