= One More Heartache =

Single by Marvin Gaye

from the album Moods of Marvin Gaye
- B-side: "When I Had Your Love"
- Released: January 31, 1966
- Recorded: November 6, 8, & 9 and December 9, 1965; January 8 & 15, 1966 Hitsville USA (Studio A)
- Genre: Soul; pop; rock and roll
- Length: 2:34
- Label: Tamla; T 54129
- Songwriter(s): Warren Moore; Smokey Robinson; Bobby Rogers; Marv Tarplin; Ronald White
- Producer(s): Smokey Robinson

Marvin Gaye singles chronology
"Ain't That Peculiar" (1965)	"One More Heartache" (1966)	"Take This Heart of Mine" (1966)

"One More Heartache" is a 1966 single recorded by Marvin Gaye for Motown Records' Tamla label. The single was written by the team of The Miracles members Bobby Rogers, Marv Tarplin, Pete Moore, Ronnie White and Smokey Robinson and produced by Robinson. The song was the third release and third consecutive Top 40 single from Gaye's Moods of Marvin Gaye album, and was produced with a similar sound to his hit "Ain't That Peculiar". "One More Heartache"was a Top 30 Pop hit, peaking at number 29 on the Billboard Hot 100, and a Top 10 R&B hit, peaking at number four on the US Billboard R&B chart.

Billboard described the song as having "a driving, infectious beat and an exciting Gaye vocal." Cash Box described the single as a "rhythmic, chorus-backed lament about a guy who feels that if his gal hurts him again it will be the straw that breaks the camel’s back." Record World said it "never lets up on its driving way."

== Cover versions ==
- A cover by the Butterfield Blues Band was released on their album The Resurrection of Pigboy Crabshaw in 1967. It was on the B side of the single of "Run Out Of Time" that was released as a teaser for the album.

== Credits ==
- Lead vocals by Marvin Gaye
- Background vocals by The Andantes: Jackie Hicks, Marlene Barrow & Louvain Demps
- Guitar by Marv Tarplin
- Other instrumentation by The Funk Brothers
