= Your Unchanging Love =

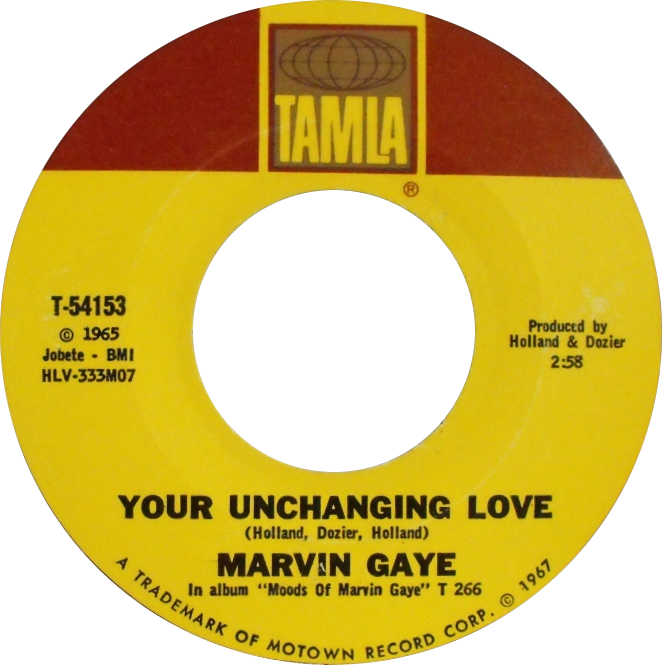
- One of side-A labels of the US single

Single by Marvin Gaye

from the album Moods of Marvin Gaye
- B-side: "I'll Take Care of You"
- Released: June 13, 1967
- Recorded: January 5, 15, 19, & 29, 1965, Hitsville U.S.A.; Detroit, Michigan
- Genre: Soul, pop
- Length: 2:37
- Label: Tamla
- Songwriter: Holland–Dozier–Holland
- Producers: Lamont Dozier, Brian Holland

Marvin Gaye singles chronology
"Ain't No Mountain High Enough" (1967)	"Your Unchanging Love" (1967)	"Your Precious Love" (1967)

"Your Unchanging Love" is a 1967 single released by American soul singer Marvin Gaye on the Tamla label.

== Overview ==
Written by Holland–Dozier–Holland, the song was featured on Marvin's Moods of Marvin Gaye album. Released during a time when Gaye was releasing hit duets by Kim Weston and Tammi Terrell, this was a rare solo detour that was successful enough to garner a top 40 pop charting where it peaked at number 33 on the Billboard Hot 100 making it the fourth top forty single issued from Moods.

Cash Box called it "a light, pulsing, medium-paced R&B romp that should see plenty of spins and sales."

The song was musically conceived on the same musical background as Marvin's landmark single, "How Sweet It Is (To Be Loved By You)", and performed better chart-wise than their previous single, "Little Darling (I Need You)".

== Track listing ==
No.	Title	Length
1.	"Your Unchanging Love"	2:58
2.	"I'll Take Care Of You"	2:50

== Personnel ==
- Lead vocals – Marvin Gaye
- Background vocals – The Andantes
- Instrumentation – The Funk Brothers
