= Ain't No Mountain High Enough =

1966 song by Marvin Gaye and Tammi Terrell

Single by Marvin Gaye & Tammi Terrell

from the album United
- B-side: "Give a Little Love"
- Released: April 20, 1967
- Recorded: December 1966 – February 1, 1967
- Studio: Hitsville U.S.A., Detroit
- Genre: Pop; soul
- Length: 2:28
- Label: Tamla (T-54149)
- Songwriters: Nickolas Ashford; Valerie Simpson
- Producers: Harvey Fuqua; Johnny Bristol

Marvin Gaye & Tammi Terrell singles chronology
| "Ain't No Mountain High Enough" (1967) | "Your Precious Love" (1967) |

Marvin Gaye singles chronology
| "It Takes Two" (1967) | "Ain't No Mountain High Enough" (1967) | "Your Unchanging Love" (1967) |

Tammi Terrell singles chronology
| "What a Good Man He Is" (1967) | "Ain't No Mountain High Enough" (1967) | "Your Precious Love" (1967) |

"Ain't No Mountain High Enough" is a song written by American singers and songwriters Nickolas Ashford & Valerie Simpson in 1966 for the Tamla label, a division of Motown. The composition was first successful as a 1967 hit single recorded by Marvin Gaye and Tammi Terrell, and became a hit again in 1970 when recorded by former Supremes frontwoman Diana Ross. The song became Ross's first solo number-one hit on the Billboard Hot 100 chart and was nominated for the Grammy Award for Best Female Pop Vocal Performance.

== Background ==
The song was written by Ashford and Simpson prior to joining Motown. British soul singer Dusty Springfield wanted to record the song but the duo declined, hoping it would give them access to the Detroit-based label. As Valerie Simpson later recalled, "We played that song for her (Springfield) but wouldn't give it to her, because we wanted to hold that back. We felt like that could be our entry to Motown. Nick called it the 'golden egg'." Springfield recorded a song with a similar verse melody in "I'm Gonna Leave You". (Note: B-side of "Goin' Back", appearing as bonus track on Dusty 1999 reissue)

Marvin Gaye and Tammi Terrell recorded "Ain't No Mountain High Enough" in December 1966. The session marked their first together. Work on the recording finished at Hitsville USA in Detroit on February 1, 1967.

The original 1967 version of "Ain't No Mountain High Enough" was a top-20 hit. According to record producers, Terrell was a little nervous and intimidated during the recording sessions because she did not rehearse the lyrics. Terrell recorded her vocals alone with producers Harvey Fuqua and Johnny Bristol, who added Gaye's vocal at a later date. "Ain't No Mountain" peaked at number 19 on the Billboard pop charts, and went to number three on the R&B charts. Billboard's original review of the single stated: "Chalk up another pulsating fast smash for Gaye with his new partner Tammi Terrell. The electricity of the duo combined with the blockbuster rhythm material grooves all the way."

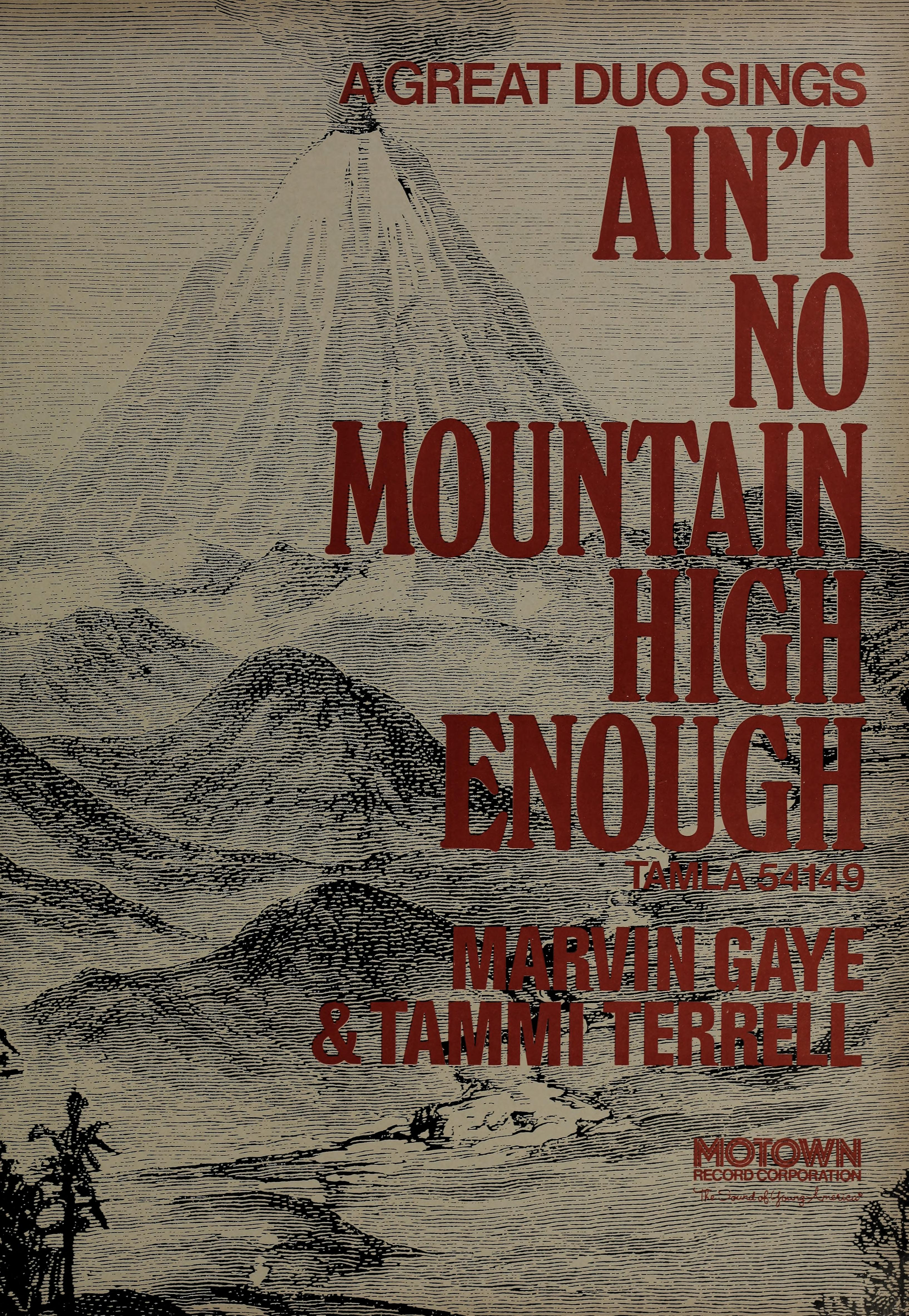
Cashbox advertisement, May 27, 1967

This original version of "Ain't No Mountain", produced by Fuqua and Bristol, was a care-free, danceable, and romantic love song that became the signature duet between Gaye and Terrell. Its success led to a string of more Ashford/Simpson penned duets (including "You're All I Need to Get By", "Ain't Nothing Like the Real Thing", and "Your Precious Love"). In 1999, the Gaye/Terrell version was inducted into the Grammy Hall of Fame.

The Gaye/Terrell version was included in the soundtrack for the 1998 film Stepmom, the 2000 film Remember the Titans, as well as the 2014 film Guardians of the Galaxy.

== Personnel ==
- All vocals by Marvin Gaye and Tammi Terrell
- Instrumentation by the Funk Brothers and Detroit Symphony Orchestra

== Charts ==
| Chart (1967) | Peak position |
|---|---|
| US Billboard Hot 100 | 19 |
| US Hot Rhythm & Blues Singles (Billboard) | 3 |
| Chart (2013) | Peak position |
| France (SNEP) | 90 |
| UK Singles (Official Charts) | 80 |

== Certifications ==
| Region | Certification | Certified units/sales |
|---|---|---|
| Belgium (BRMA) | Gold | 10,000^{‡} |
| Denmark (IFPI Danmark) | 2× Platinum | 180,000^{‡} |
| Germany (BVMI) | Platinum | 600,000^{‡} |
| Italy (FIMI) | Platinum | 50,000^{‡} |
| New Zealand (RMNZ) | 6× Platinum | 180,000^{‡} |
| Spain (Promusicae) | 3× Platinum | 180,000^{‡} |
| United Kingdom (BPI) Digital sales since 2004 | 5× Platinum | 3,000,000^{‡} |
| United States (RIAA) | 7× Platinum | 7,000,000^{‡} |
^{‡} Sales+streaming figures based on certification alone.

== The Supremes and Temptations version ==
Diana Ross & the Supremes recorded a version of "Ain't No Mountain High Enough", which was more faithful to the Terrell-Gaye original version, as a duet with The Temptations. That song was an album cut from a joint LP released by Motown Records in 1968 on the two superstar groups, titled Diana Ross & the Supremes Join the Temptations.

== Diana Ross solo version ==
"Ain't No Mountain High Enough"

Single by Diana Ross

from the album Diana Ross
- B-side: "Can't It Wait Until Tomorrow"
- Released: July 16, 1970
- Recorded: March 13–18, 1970
- Studio: Hitsville USA (Studio A), Detroit, Michigan
- Genre: Psychedelic soul
- Length: 6:18 (album version); 3:32 (single version)
- Label: Motown (M 1169)
- Songwriter: Nickolas Ashford & Valerie Simpson
- Producers: Nickolas Ashford & Valerie Simpson

Diana Ross singles chronology
| "Reach Out and Touch (Somebody's Hand)" (1970) | "Ain't No Mountain High Enough" (1970) | "Remember Me" (1970) |

In early 1970, after the Top 20 success of her first solo single, "Reach Out and Touch (Somebody's Hand)", Ashford and Simpson had Ross re-record "Ain't No Mountain High Enough". Initially, Ross was apprehensive, but was convinced to make the recording. The remake was a complete reworking of the song, featuring a style similar to gospel with elements of classical music strings and horns, and spoken-word passages from Ross. The Andantes, Jimmy Beavers, Jo Armstead, Ashford & Simpson and Brenda Evans and Billie Calvin of the Undisputed Truth were used as backing singers, giving the song a soul and gospel vocal element. Ross' version of the song was released on July 19, 1970, as the second and final single from her solo self-titled 1970 debut album by Motown. It peaked at number one on the Billboard Hot 100 for three weeks in September/October 1970.

Motown chief Berry Gordy did not like the record upon first hearing it. He hated the spoken-word passages and wanted the song to begin with the climactic chorus/bridge. It was not until radio stations nationwide were editing their own versions and adding it to their playlists that Ashford and Simpson were able to convince Gordy to release an edited three-minute version as a single. Ross' version of "Ain't No Mountain High Enough" rose to number one on both the pop and R&B singles charts, higher than Gaye/Terrell's version. Ross received a Grammy nomination for Best Female Pop Vocal Performance. The song is performed in the key of C minor for most of the song, changing to D# minor towards its conclusion.

In 2017, "Ain't No Mountain High Enough" was remixed by Eric Kupper, StoneBridge and Chris Cox, amongst others, on Motown/UMe. The remix peaked at number one on Billboard's Dance Club Songs chart.

In June 2026, CBS News included Ross's rendition of the song in its list of the 250 essential American songs of the past 250 years.

=== Personnel ===
- Lead vocals by Diana Ross
- Backing vocals by Nickolas Ashford, Valerie Simpson, Jo Armstead, the Andantes, Jimmy Beavers, Brenda Evans, and Billie Calvin
- Instrumentation by the Funk Brothers
- Brass and strings by New York session musicians
- Arranged by Paul Riser.

=== Charts ===
==== Weekly charts ====
| Chart (1970) | Peak position |
|---|---|
| Australia (Go-Set) | 31 |
| Australia (Kent Music Report) | 25 |
| Canada (Billboard) | 4 |
| Canada Top Singles (RPM) | 11 |
| Ireland (IRMA) | 14 |
| Netherlands (Tipparade) | 14 |
| UK Singles (Official Charts) | 6 |
| US Adult Contemporary (Billboard) | 6 |
| US Billboard Hot 100 | 1 |
| US Best Selling Soul Singles (Billboard) | 1 |
| US Cash Box Top 100 | 1 |

| Chart (2022) | Peak position |
|---|---|
| UK Singles Downloads (Official Charts) | 74 |

==== Year-end charts ====
| Chart (1970) | Rank |
|---|---|
| Canada Top Singles (RPM) | 97 |
| US Billboard Hot 100 | 6 |
| US R&B (Billboard) | 24 |

=== Certifications ===
| Region | Certification | Certified units/sales |
|---|---|---|
| United Kingdom (BPI) | Silver | 200,000^{‡} |
^{‡} Sales+streaming figures based on certification alone.

== Other notable covers ==
- In 1981, American disco band Inner Life released their version, which reached No. 20 on the U.S. Dance chart. It is particularly noted for the 10 minute Larry Levan remix.
- In 1981, Boys Town Gang recorded a medley of the song "Remember Me" together with "Ain't No Mountain High Enough". The single was a No. 5 U.S. Dance hit and a top 20 hit in Belgium and the Netherlands.
- In 1991, Australian singer Jimmy Barnes released an album of soul remakes titled Soul Deep, including his rock version of "Ain't No Mountain High Enough". His version, released on January 13, 1992, reached No. 28 in Australia that February.
- In 2003, Michael McDonald recorded his version for his studio album Motown. The song was also released as a single, charting at No. 5 on the US Adult Contemporary chart.
- In 2004, Jimmy Somerville recorded his version for his studio album Home Again. The song was also released as a single, charting in Germany at number 88.
- In 2018, a remix of the Diana Ross version reached No. 1 on the US Dance Club Songs chart.
- In 2021, American singer Jennifer Hudson released a cover version, produced by fellow singer will.i.am.
- In 2024, German Eurodance trio Cascada recorded a cover version for their studio album "Studio 24".

== See also ==
- List of Billboard Hot 100 number ones of 1970
- List of number-one dance singles of 2018 (U.S.)

== Bibliography ==
- Gaye, Frankie (2003). Marvin Gaye, My Brother. Milwaukee: Hal Leonard Corporation. ISBN 978-1-61774-498-3 – via the Internet Archive.
