= It Takes Two (Marvin Gaye and Kim Weston song) =

1966 single by Marvin Gaye and Kim Weston

Single by Marvin Gaye and Kim Weston

from the album Take Two
- B-side: "It's Got to Be a Miracle"
- Released: December 4, 1966
- Recorded: November 27 and December 6, 1965, and March 2, 1966, Detroit, Michigan
- Length: 3:00
- Label: Tamla
- Songwriters: William "Mickey" Stevenson, Sylvia Moy
- Producers: William "Mickey" Stevenson, Henry Cosby

Marvin Gaye singles chronology
"Little Darling (I Need You)" (1966)	"It Takes Two" (1966)	"Ain't No Mountain High Enough" (1967)

Kim Weston singles chronology
"Helpless" (1966)	"It Takes Two" (1966)	"I Got What You Need" (1967)

"It Takes Two" is a hit single recorded in late 1965 by American singer-songwriter Marvin Gaye and American soul singer Kim Weston, released in 1966 on Motown's Tamla label.

== Background ==
Produced by Weston's then-husband, longtime Gaye collaborator William "Mickey" Stevenson, and co-written by Stevenson and Sylvia Moy, "It Takes Two" centered on a romantic lyric that depicted many things in life (dreams, love, wishes, etc.) being better with two people instead of one. The single became Gaye's most successful duet single to date, later outperformed by Gaye's duets with Tammi Terrell.

Cash Box said the single is a "rhythmic, infectious romancer that superbly matches the two fine voices."

Gaye and Weston's duet peaked at No. 14 on the Billboard Pop charts and No. 4 on Billboard′s Soul Singles chart in January 1967. "It Takes Two" was also Gaye's first major hit in the UK, where it peaked at No. 16 on the British singles charts in the spring of that same year.

== Personnel ==
- All vocals by Marvin Gaye and Kim Weston
- Instrumentation by The Funk Brothers and The Detroit Symphony Orchestra
- Produced by William "Mickey" Stevenson

== Charts ==
Chart (1966–1967)	Peak position
Belgium (Ultratop 50 Wallonia)	45
Canada Top Singles (RPM)	14
Netherlands (Dutch Top 40)	15
Netherlands (Single Top 100)	13
UK Singles (Official Charts)	16
UK R&B (Record Mirror)	1
US Billboard Hot 100	14
US Hot R&B/Hip-Hop Songs (Billboard)	4
US Cash Box Top 100	43

== Certifications ==
Region	Certification	Certified units/sales
United Kingdom (BPI)	Silver	200,000^{‡}
^{‡} Sales+streaming figures based on certification alone.

== Rod Stewart and Tina Turner version ==
"It Takes Two"

Single by Rod Stewart and Tina Turner

from the album Vagabond Heart
- B-side: "Hot Legs" (live)
- Released: November 12, 1990
- Length: 4:13
- Label: Warner Bros.
- Songwriters: William "Mickey" Stevenson, Sylvia Moy
- Producer: Bernard Edwards

Rod Stewart singles chronology
"I Don't Want To Talk About It" (1990)	"It Takes Two" (1990)	"Rhythm of My Heart" (1991)

Tina Turner singles chronology
"Be Tender with Me Baby" (1990)	""It Takes Two" (Duet with Rod Stewart)" (1990)	"Nutbush City Limits (The 90's Version)" (1991)

British singer Rod Stewart and American singer Tina Turner recorded a cover of "It Takes Two" released in November 1990 by Warner Bros., which was also featured in a television advertising campaign for Pepsi. It was the lead single from Stewart's sixteenth album, Vagabond Heart (1991), produced by Bernard Edwards. The duet was a European hit, peaking at No. 1 in Denmark. It also reached No. 5 in the UK and was a Top 10 single in several European countries. The song later appeared on both artists' greatest hits albums: Turner's Simply the Best (1991), and Stewart's The Very Best of Rod Stewart (2001).

=== Charts ===
==== Weekly charts ====
Weekly chart performance for Turner and Stewart's cover
Chart (1990–1991)	Peak position
Australia (ARIA)	16
Austria (Ö3 Austria Top 40)	15
Belgium (Ultratop 50 Flanders)	6
Denmark (IFPI)	1
Europe (European Hot 100 Singles)	7
Finland (Suomen virallinen lista)	12
Germany (GfK)	22
Ireland (IRMA)	4
Italy (Musica e dischi)	4
Luxembourg (Radio Luxembourg)	3
Netherlands (Dutch Top 40)	3
Netherlands (Single Top 100)	3
New Zealand (Recorded Music NZ)	19
Spain Radio (AFYVE)	36
Sweden (Sverigetopplistan)	11
Switzerland (Schweizer Hitparade)	10
UK Singles (Official Charts)	5

==== Year-end charts ====
Annual chart rankings for Turner and Stewart's cover
Chart (1990)	Position
Netherlands (Single Top 100)	50
Sweden (Topplistan)	63

Chart (1991)	Position
Europe (European Hit Radio)	55
Italy (Musica e dischi)	46

=== Release history ===
Street dates for Turner and Stewart's cover
Region	Date	Format(s)	Label(s)	Ref.
United Kingdom	November 12, 1990	7-inch vinyl; 12-inch vinyl; CD; cassette	Warner Bros.	
Australia	January 21, 1991	7-inch vinyl; CD; cassette	Warner Bros.	

== Other cover versions ==
- In 1967, Otis Redding and Carla Thomas released a cover version on their album of duets titled King & Queen on the Stax label, which was heavily influenced by Marvin Gaye's duets and was Otis Redding's final studio album before his death in December that same year.
- In 1989, a Children In Need charity single was released (retitled "It Takes Two, Baby") featuring BBC Radio 1 DJs Liz Kershaw and Bruno Brookes with Jive Bunny and Londonbeat. It charted at #53 in the UK Singles chart.
- The song charted on the Canadian Adult Contemporary charts in 1982 on a single by Susan Jacks.

== Popular culture ==
- The song was played over the closing credits of the 1995 film It Takes Two and 2002 TV adaptation of Jacqueline Wilson's novel Double Act.
- It was featured in the ending scene of the film Hot Shots! Part Deux.
