= Johnny Bristol =

American musician (1939–2004)

- Bristol c. 1970

Background information
- Born: John William Bristol; February 3, 1939; Morganton, North Carolina, U.S.
- Died: March 21, 2004 (aged 65) Brighton Township, Michigan, U.S
- Genres: R&B, soul
- Occupations: Singer, songwriter, record producer
- Years active: 1959–1993
- Labels: Motown, MGM, Ariola/Hansa, Atlantic

John William Bristol (February 3, 1939 – March 21, 2004) was an American musician, most famous as a songwriter and record producer for the Motown label in the late 1960s and early 1970s. He was a native of Morganton, North Carolina, about which he wrote an eponymous song. His composition "Love Me for a Reason" saw global success when covered by the Osmonds including a number one on the UK charts in 1974. His most famous solo recording was "Hang On in There Baby" recorded in 1974, which reached the top ten in the United States and number 3 in the United Kingdom. Both singles were in the UK top 5 simultaneously.

== Motown producer ==
Bristol first came to local attention in the Detroit area as a member of the soul duo Johnny & Jackey with Jackey Beavers, an associate Bristol met while in the US Air Force. The pair recorded two singles in 1959 for Anna Records, a label owned by Gwen Gordy (Berry Gordy's sister) and Billy Davis and four 45s for Gwen Gordy and Harvey Fuqua's Tri-Phi label, none of which was a success beyond the Midwestern United States.

In the mid-1960s, Motown had absorbed Tri-Phi and Bristol began working with Fuqua as a songwriter and producer. Amongst their successes as producers were hit singles: Marvin Gaye and Tammi Terrell's "Ain't No Mountain High Enough" (1967), "Your Precious Love" (1967), and "If I Could Build My Whole World Around You" (1968); Edwin Starr's "Twenty-Five Miles" (1969); and David Ruffin's "My Whole World Ended (The Moment You Left Me)" (1969).

Bristol flourished at Motown working with some of the label's best-selling acts. His producer and/or writer credits included the Velvelettes' "These Things Will Keep Me Loving You" (1966); Gladys Knight & the Pips' "I Don't Want to Do Wrong" (1971) and "Daddy Could Swear, I Declare" (1973); and Jr. Walker & the All Stars, who charted with a number of Bristol-written singles and albums, including "What Does It Take (To Win Your Love)" (1969), "Gotta Hold On to This Feeling" (1970), "Way Back Home" (1971) and "Walk in the Night" (1971). One of his last successes was Jermaine Jackson's first solo record, "That's How Love Goes" (1972).

Notably, Bristol was the producer and co-writer of the final singles for both Diana Ross & the Supremes and Smokey Robinson & the Miracles, before each group lost its namesake lead singer. While the Miracles' "We've Come Too Far to End It Now" (1972) was an original, the Supremes' "Someday We'll Be Together" (1969) was a remake of a Johnny & Jackey single from 1961. Bristol is the male voice on the Supremes' version of "Someday We'll Be Together", singing response to Diana Ross' lead vocal. (Ross actually recorded the song as her initial solo release with session singers the Waters Sisters.)

== Producer and solo performer ==
Bristol left Motown in 1973 to join CBS as a producer. He worked with a number of emerging singers that included Randy Crawford, for whom Bristol wrote "Caught in Love's Triangle", as well as producing and writing for established performers such as: Tom Jones, Marlena Shaw, Johnny Mathis, Jerry Butler and Boz Scaggs. In 1974 he wrote and produced "La La Peace Song" recorded by both Al Wilson and O.C. Smith. Bristol's vocals are featured on the Al Wilson version.

Now in his early 30s, he was anxious to resume his own recording career, and when CBS/Columbia showed little enthusiasm he signed a recording contract with MGM. At MGM, Bristol recorded two successful albums Hang On in There Baby and Feeling the Magic and charted with several singles, notably "Hang On in There Baby" (1974, number 8 US Pop, number 2 US R&B chart and number 3 UK), "You and I" (1974, number 20 US R&B), "Leave My World" (1975, number 23 US R&B) and "Do It to My Mind" (1976, number 5 US R&B). He also recorded the original version of "Love Me for a Reason", later a major hit for The Osmonds. He was nominated for a Grammy Award in 1975 for Best New Artist, ultimately losing out to Marvin Hamlisch.

Bristol then recorded two albums for Atlantic, Bristol's Creme (1976) and Strangers (1978). One track from the Atlantic period, "Strangers In The Dark Corners", has become popular on the European rare-soul scene. He maintained a parallel role as a producer during this period, working mainly for artists signed to Columbia Records, including Boz Scaggs. Bristol can be credited with creating Scaggs' blue-eyed soul sound for the Slow Dancer album (1974). Bristol also produced Tom Jones' 1975 album, Memories Don't Leave Like People Do, which included five covers of Bristol's songs, including the title track. He continued to be held in high regard as a producer, and some of the other acts with whom he worked included: Tavares, Margie Joseph, The Jackson Sisters and two duets with Linda Evans, “Sweet and Deep” and “Share with Me My Dream” on his 1981 album “Free to Be Me”.

Bristol's main market was in Europe by the early 1980s. His duet with Amii Stewart on a medley of "My Guy – My Girl" reached number 39 on the UK Singles Chart in 1980. A deal for Ariola/Hansa saw him score with club hits "Love No Longer Has a Hold on Me" and "Take Me Down". An accompanying album failed to consolidate his status, and it would be eight years before new product by Bristol appeared, with a 12" single "I'm Just a Musician" for Hansa. An affiliation in 1989 with the UK record label Motorcity Records was brief, but did result in one of Bristol's most popular releases, "Man Up in the Sky", and his version of the Bristol-penned "What Does It Take to Win Your Love", originally a hit for Jr. Walker & the All Stars.

Bristol's last releases were a 12" single in 1991 for Whichway Records, "Come to Me", and an album, Life & Love, released for the Japanese market in 1993 by Blues Interactions (P-Vine Records). The latter included Earth, Wind & Fire's "That's the Way of the World" as a duet with his daughter, Shanna J. Bristol. The album received a US release three years later under the title Come To Me.

Bristol died in his Brighton Township, Michigan, home on March 21, 2004, of natural causes, at the age of 65.

A comprehensive article on his career is contained in issue 51 of the music magazine, In the Basement.

Bristol was inducted into the North Carolina Music Hall of Fame in 2009.

Bristol was married twice. His first marriage was to Maude Perry. They had two children. His second marriage was to Iris Gordy. They had one child, Karla Gordy Bristol, who is a City of Beverly Hills Commissioner.

== Discography ==
=== Albums ===
| Year | Title | Chart positions | | | |
| Year | Title | UK | AUS | US | US R&B |
|---|---|---|---|---|---|
| 1974 | Hang On in There Baby | 12 | 74 | 82 | 7 |
| 1975 | Feeling the Magic | — | — | — | 29 |
| 1976 | Bristol's Creme | — | — | 154 | 43 |
| 1978 | Strangers | — | — | — | — |
| 1981 | Free to Be Me | — | — | — | — |
| 1993 | Life & Love (retitled Come to Me for 1995 US release) | — | — | — | — |
"—" denotes the album failed to chart

=== Compilation albums ===
- Best of Johnny Bristol (Polydor, 1978)
- The MGM Years (Hip-O Select, 2004)

=== Singles ===
| Year | Title / Songwriter(s) | Chart positions | | | | | Certifications |
| Year | Title / Songwriter(s) | UK | AUS | US Hot 100 | US R&B | US Dance | Certifications |
|---|---|---|---|---|---|---|---|
| 1974 | "Hang On in There Baby" (Bristol) | 3 | 37 | 8 | 2 | — | BPI: Silver |
| 1974 | "Memories Don't Leave Like People Do" (Bristol) | 52 (Note: Chart position is from the official UK "Breakers List".) | — | — | — | — | |
| 1974 | "You and I" (Bristol) | — | — | 48 | 20 | — | |
| 1975 | "Leave My World" (Bristol) | — | — | — | 23 | — | |
| 1975 | "Love Takes Tears" (Bristol) | — | — | — | 72 | — | |
| 1976 | "Do It to My Mind" (Bristol) | — | — | 43 | 5 | — | |
| 1976 | "I Sho' Like Groovin' with Ya" (Bristol) | — | — | — | 47 | — | |
| 1976 | "You Turned Me on to Love" (Bristol) | — | — | — | 36 | — | |
| 1978 | "Waiting on Love" (Bristol) | — | — | — | 27 | — | |
| 1978 | "When He Comes (You Will Know)" (Bristol) | — | — | — | — | — | |
| 1978 | "Strangers in the Dark Corners" (Bristol) | — | — | — | — | — | |
| 1979 | "Hang On in There Baby" (duet with Alton McClain) (Bristol) | — | — | — | — | — | |
| 1980 | "My Guy – My Girl" (Robinson/White) (duet with Amii Stewart) | 39 | — | 63 | 76 | — | |
| 1980 | "Love No Longer Has a Hold on Me" (Bristol/Powell) | — | — | — | 75 | 17 | |
| 1981 | "Take Me Down" (Pennington/Gray) | — | — | — | — | — | |
| 1981 | "Sweet and Deep" w/Linda Evans | — | — | — | — | — | |
| 1981 | "Share with Me My Dream" w/Linda Evans | — | — | — | — | — | |
| 1989 | "Man Up in the Sky" | — | — | — | — | — | |
| 1989 | "I'm Just a Musician" (Powell/Glasco/Colby) | — | — | — | — | — | |
| 1991 | "Come to Me" (Thomas/Taylor) | — | — | — | — | — | |
"—" denotes the single failed to chart

== See also ==
- List of 1970s one-hit wonders in the United States
- List of disco artists (F-K)
- List of performers on Top of the Pops
