= Kim Weston =

American soul singer and Motown alumna (born 1939)

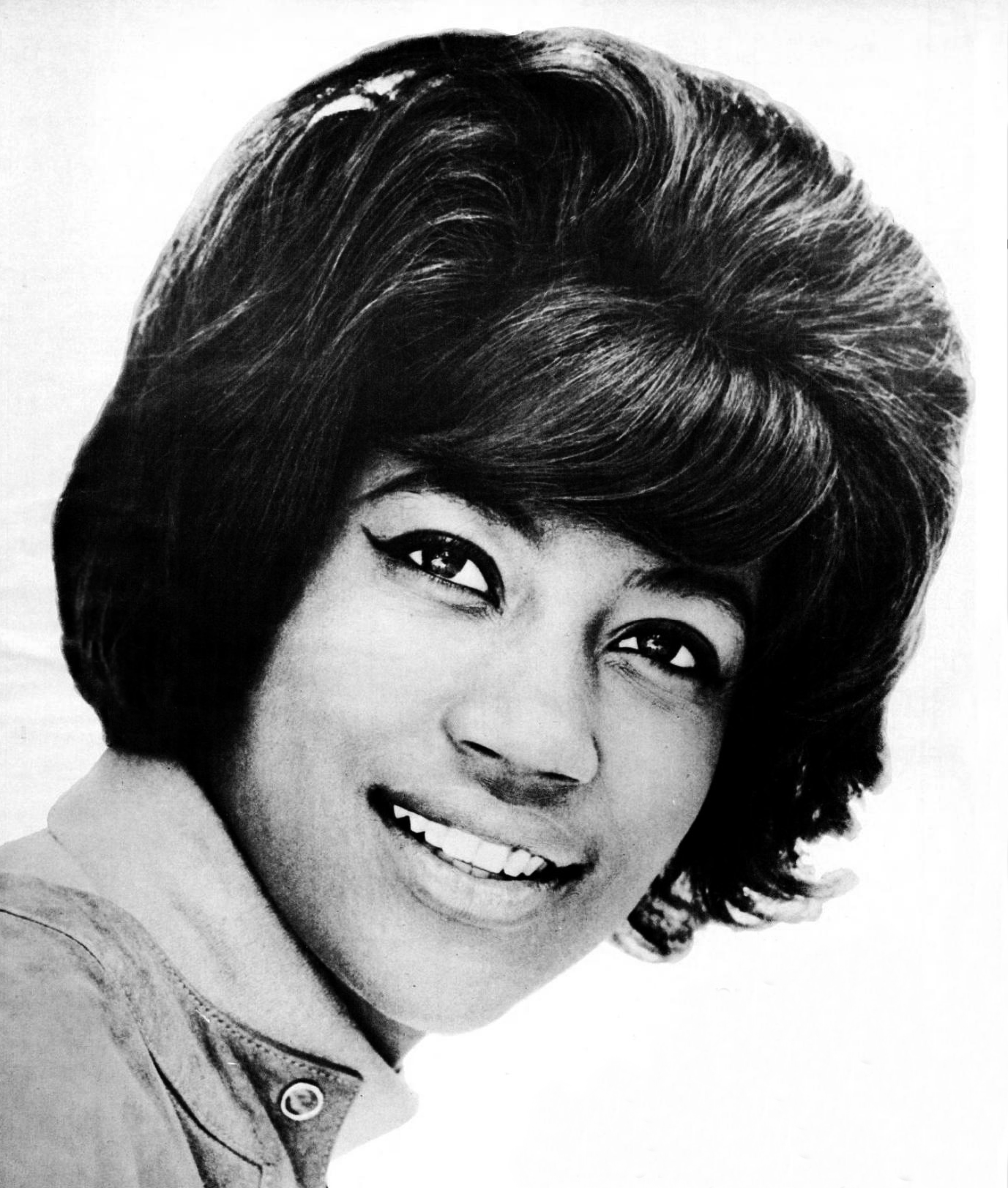
- Weston in 1965

Background information
- Born: Agatha Nathalia Weston; December 20, 1939 (age 86)
- Origin: Detroit, Michigan, U.S.
- Genres: Soul; R&B
- Occupation: Singer
- Instrument: Vocals
- Years active: 1961–present
- Labels: Motown (Tamla, Gordy); MGM; Stax; Motorcity

Kim Weston (born December 20, 1939) is an American soul singer and Motown alumna. In the 1960s, she scored hits with the songs "Love Me All the Way" and "Take Me in Your Arms (Rock Me a Little While)", and with her duet with Marvin Gaye, "It Takes Two".

== Career ==
Born Agatha Nathalia Weston in Detroit, she was signed to Motown in 1961, scoring a minor hit with "Love Me All the Way" (R&B No. 24, Pop No. 88). "Love Me All the Way" was originally the b-side to "It Should Have Been Me", however, it was switched when a DJ reacted to "Love Me All the Way". Weston's biggest solo hits with Motown were "Take Me in Your Arms (Rock Me a Little While)" (R&B No. 4, Pop No. 50, later covered by the Isley Brothers; Blood, Sweat & Tears; Jermaine Jackson; the Doobie Brothers; and Phil Collins), and "Helpless" (R&B No. 13, Pop No. 56, entered Cashbox March 26, 1966, previously recorded by The Four Tops on their album, Four Tops Second Album). She is notable for singing the hit "It Takes Two" with Marvin Gaye in 1966, and for her later recording of the Black National Anthem, "Lift Every Voice and Sing". It was the success of "It Takes Two" that caused Motown to partner Gaye with Tammi Terrell, spawning even more success for the label.

Weston left Motown in 1967, and later sued the company over disputes about royalties. She and her then-husband William "Mickey" Stevenson (former A&R head at Motown) both moved to Los Angeles and began their career with MGM Records, with Stevenson running his own label at MGM. Weston cut a couple of singles for MGM, "I Got What You Need" "Nobody," which went largely unnoticed due to lack of airplay and promotion. She made an album for the label, This Is America, which included her popular version of the Black National Anthem, "Lift Every Voice and Sing". This was released as a single and featured in the movie, Wattstax. All the money from the single was donated to the United Negro College Fund. She recorded several more albums for various labels, Stax/Volt among them, and also made an album of duets with Johnny Nash. Weston declined in charts by the time new singles were released, and Weston reportedly relocated to Israel, where she worked with young singers. Weston also participated in a musical called Sound and the Kidnapped African.

Weston made a guest appearance on The Bill Cosby Show (1969–1971), in episode No. 50 in March 1971.

Along with many former Motown artists, Weston signed with Ian Levine's Motorcity Records in the 1980s, releasing the single "Signal Your Intention", which peaked at No. 1 in the UK Hi-NRG chart. It was followed by the album Investigate (1990), which included some re-recordings of her Motown hits as well as new material. A second album for the label, Talking Loud (1992), was never released, although all the songs were included on the compilation The Best Of Kim Weston (1996).

Weston was inducted into the inaugural class of the Official Rhythm & Blues Music Hall of Fame at Cleveland State University in August 2013.

== Discography ==
Studio albums

- 1966: Take Two (duet album with Marvin Gaye) (Tamla T 270)
- 1966: Take Me in Your Arms (Motown) (shelved)
- 1967: For the First Time (MGM SE-4477)
- 1968: This Is America (MGM SE-4561)
- 1969: Johnny Nash & Kim Weston (duet album with Johnny Nash) (Major Minor SMLP 54)
- 1970: Big Brass Four Poster (People PLP-5001)
- 1970: Kim Kim Kim (Volt VOS 6014)
- 1990: Investigate (Motorcity MOTCLP29)
- 1991: Talking Loud (Motorcity Records) (shelved)

Compilations

- 1991: Greatest Hits & Rare Classics
- 1996: The Very Best of the Motorcity Recordings
- 2003: 20th Century Masters – The Millennium Collection: The Best of Kim Weston
- 2005: Motown Anthology

Live releases

- 2020: Live in Detroit 1978

Chart singles

Year	Single	Chart positions			Album
Year	Single	US	U.S. R&B	UK	Album
1963	"Love Me All the Way"	88	24	-	
1964	"What Good Am I Without You" (duet with Marvin Gaye)	61	28	-	Take Two (1967)
1965	"Take Me in Your Arms (Rock Me a Little While)"	50	4	-	
1966	"Helpless"	56	13	-	
1967	"It Takes Two" (duet with Marvin Gaye)	14	4	16	Take Two
1967	"I Got What You Need"	99	-	-	
1968	"Nobody"	-	39	-	
1969	"We Try Harder" (duet with Johnny Nash)	135	-	-	
1970	"Danger, Heartbreak Ahead"	-	49	-	
1970	"Lift Ev'ry Voice and Sing"	120	50	-	
