= The Complete Tony Bennett/Bill Evans Recordings =

Compilation album by Tony Bennett and Bill Evans
- Released: April 14, 2009
- Recorded: June 10–13, 1975 & September 27–30, 1976
- Genre: Vocal jazz
- Length: 140:21
- Label: Fantasy
- Producer: Nick Phillips

Tony Bennett and Bill Evans chronology
Together Again (1977)	The Complete Tony Bennett/Bill Evans Recordings (2009)

Bill Evans chronology
The Complete Village Vanguard Recordings, 1961 (2005)	The Complete Tony Bennett/Bill Evans Recordings (2009)	Momentum (2012)

Professional ratings
Review scores
Source	Rating
All About Jazz	(favorable)
Allmusic	5/5 stars

The Complete Tony Bennett/Bill Evans Recordings is a two-CD box set released in 2009 compiling the two recording sessions by singer Tony Bennett and pianist Bill Evans which produced The Tony Bennett/Bill Evans Album in 1975 and Together Again in 1976, including twenty alternate takes and two bonus tracks not released on the original albums.

== Track listing ==
=== Disc one ===
1. "Young and Foolish" (Albert Hague, Arnold B. Horwitt) – 3:54
2. "The Touch of Your Lips" (Ray Noble) – 3:56
3. "Some Other Time" (Leonard Bernstein, Betty Comden, Adolph Green) – 4:42
4. "When in Rome" (Cy Coleman, Carolyn Leigh) – 2:55
5. "We'll Be Together Again" (Carl T. Fischer, Frankie Laine) – 4:38
6. "My Foolish Heart" (Ned Washington, Victor Young) – 4:51
7. "Waltz for Debby" (Bill Evans, Gene Lees) – 4:04
8. "But Beautiful" (Johnny Burke, Jimmy Van Heusen) – 3:36
9. "Days of Wine and Roses" (Henry Mancini, Johnny Mercer) – 2:23
10. "The Bad and the Beautiful" (Dory Previn, David Raksin) – 2:18
11. "Lucky to Be Me" (Bernstein, Comden, Green) – 3:45
12. "Make Someone Happy" (Comden, Green, Jule Styne) – 3:53
13. "You're Nearer" (Lorenz Hart, Richard Rodgers) – 2:23
14. "A Child Is Born" (Thad Jones, Alec Wilder) – 3:17
15. "The Two Lonely People" (B. Evans, Carol Hall) – 4:27
16. "You Don't Know What Love Is" (Gene de Paul, Don Raye) – 3:27
17. "Maybe September" (Ray Evans, Percy Faith, Jay Livingston) – 3:55
18. "Lonely Girl" (R. Evans, Livingston, Neal Hefti) – 2:49
19. "You Must Believe in Spring" (Alan Bergman, Marilyn Bergman, Jacques Demy, Michel Legrand) – 5:51
20. "Who Can I Turn To (When Nobody Needs Me)" (Leslie Bricusse, Anthony Newley) – 2:28 Bonus track not on original LP
21. "Dream Dancing" (Cole Porter) – 3:46 Bonus track not on original LP

=== Disc two ===
1. "Young and Foolish" alternate take 4 – 4:45
2. "The Touch of Your Lips" alternate take 1 – 2:54
3. "Some Other Time" alternate take 7 – 4:56
4. "When in Rome" alternate take 11 – 2:57
5. "Waltz for Debby" alternate take 8 – 3:50
6. "The Bad and the Beautiful" alternate take 1 – 2:12
7. "The Bad and the Beautiful" alternate take 2 – 2:09
8. "Make Someone Happy" alternate take 5 – 3:54
9. "You're Nearer" alternate take 9 – 2:58
10. "A Child Is Born" alternate take 2 – 3:26
11. "A Child Is Born" alternate take 7 – 3:12
12. "The Two Lonely People" alternate take 5 – 4:43
13. "You Don't Know What Love Is" alternate take 16 – 3:33
14. "You Don't Know What Love Is" alternate take 18 – 3:37
15. "Maybe September" alternate take 5 – 4:37
16. "Maybe September" alternate take 8 – 4:31
17. "Lonely Girl" alternate take 1 – 2:57
18. "You Must Believe in Spring" alternate take 1 – 6:01
19. "You Must Believe in Spring" alternate take 4 – 5:36
20. "Who Can I Turn To?" alternate take 6 – 2:29

== Personnel ==
- Tony Bennett – vocals
- Bill Evans – piano
