= Dreamland (Glass Animals album) =

- Standard physical edition cover. Six limited-edition physical copies and the digital edition were all issued with alternative covers.

Studio album by Glass Animals
- Released: 7 August 2020
- Length: 45:17
- Labels: Wolf Tone; Polydor
- Producer: Dave Bayley

Glass Animals chronology
| How to Be a Human Being (2016) | Dreamland (2020) | I Love You So F***ing Much (2024) |

Singles from Dreamland
- 1. "Tokyo Drifting" Released: 13 November 2019; 2. "Your Love (Déjà Vu)" Released: 19 February 2020; 3. "Dreamland" Released: 1 May 2020; 4. "Heat Waves" Released: 29 June 2020; 5. "It's All So Incredibly Loud" Released: 31 July 2020; 6. "Tangerine" Released: 20 December 2020; 7. "Space Ghost Coast to Coast" Released: 13 May 2021; 8. "I Don't Wanna Talk (I Just Wanna Dance)" Released: 10 September 2021

Dreamland is the third studio album by English indie rock band Glass Animals. It was released on 7 August 2020, having been pushed back from its initial release date of 10 July 2020.

Dreamland is the band's first album since How to Be a Human Being (2016) and was conceived in the aftermath of their drummer being involved in a near-fatal collision in July 2018. The album was written and produced almost entirely by frontman Dave Bayley and features heavily autobiographical lyrics, a radical difference from the band's previous work. It derives musical and lyrical inspiration from Bayley's childhood in Texas, particularly from the popular culture and media of 1990s and early 2000s America. The album has been described as being "drenched in" nostalgia and is structured around a series of interludes of audio from Bayley's childhood home videos. Dreamland was influenced by the R&B and hip hop music from the early 2000s, and features an appearance from American rapper Denzel Curry.

Dreamland received mostly favourable reviews from music critics and debuted at number 2 on the UK Albums Chart and number 7 on the US Billboard 200. Five singles were issued in promotion of the album: "Tokyo Drifting" (with Denzel Curry), "Your Love (Déjà Vu)", the eponymously named "Dreamland", the chart-topping "Heat Waves", and "It's All So Incredibly Loud". A visual album, entitled Dreamland: The Home Movies, was released on VHS shortly after the album's release.

== Background and recording ==
On 2 July 2018, Glass Animals drummer Joe Seaward was hit by a lorry while cycling in Dublin, Ireland and suffered a broken leg and fractured skull, and subsequently underwent brain surgery. The band cancelled their remaining tour dates for rest of the year as a result. With Seaward's fate unknown at the time, Dave Bayley said it was "difficult to look forwards" and he found himself looking backwards, thinking back to old memories and "finding comfort in them even if they were uncomfortable in themselves". In September 2018, Seaward posted an update detailing his recovery in having to learn to talk, read, and walk again, and revealed he started playing the drums again.

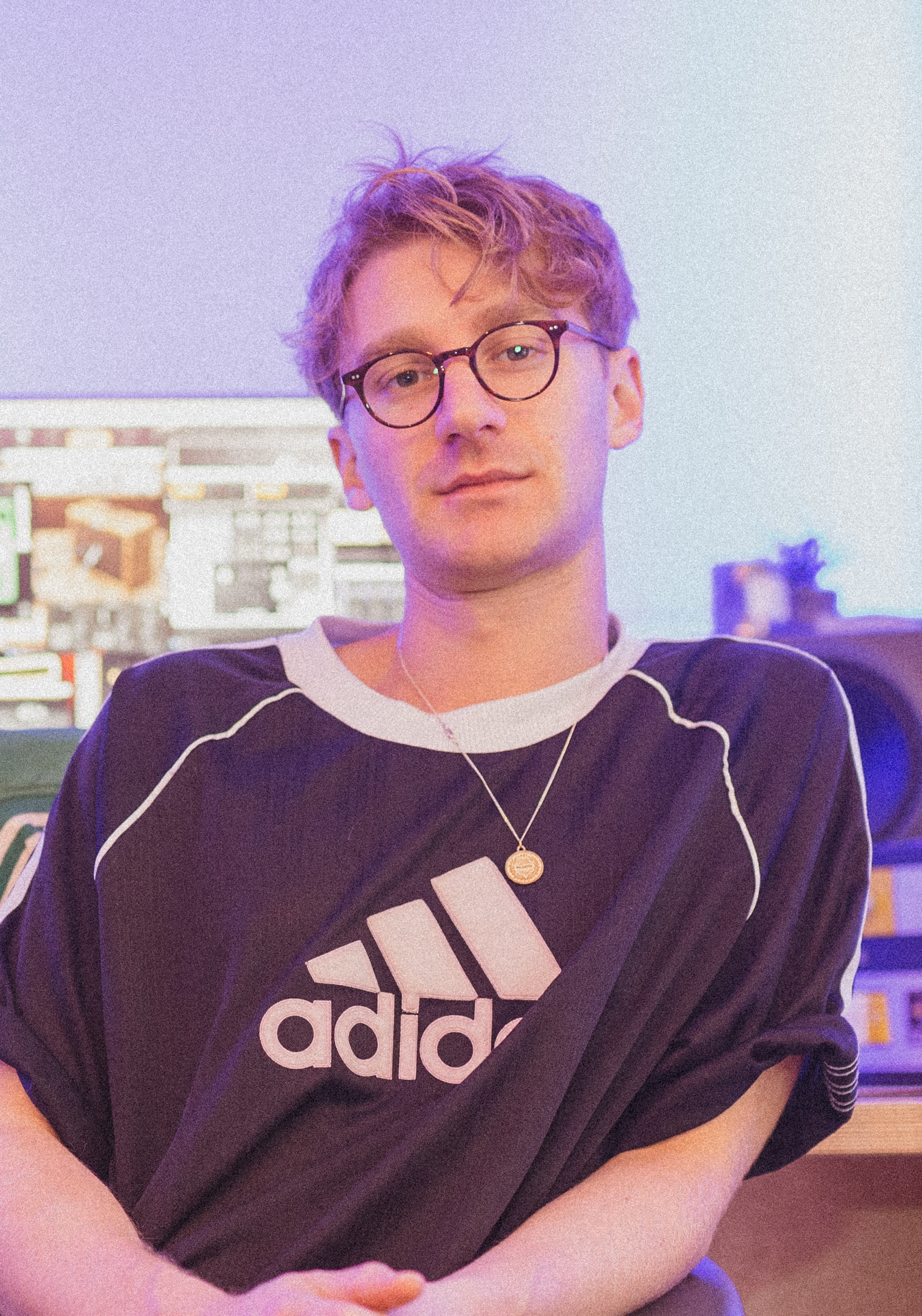
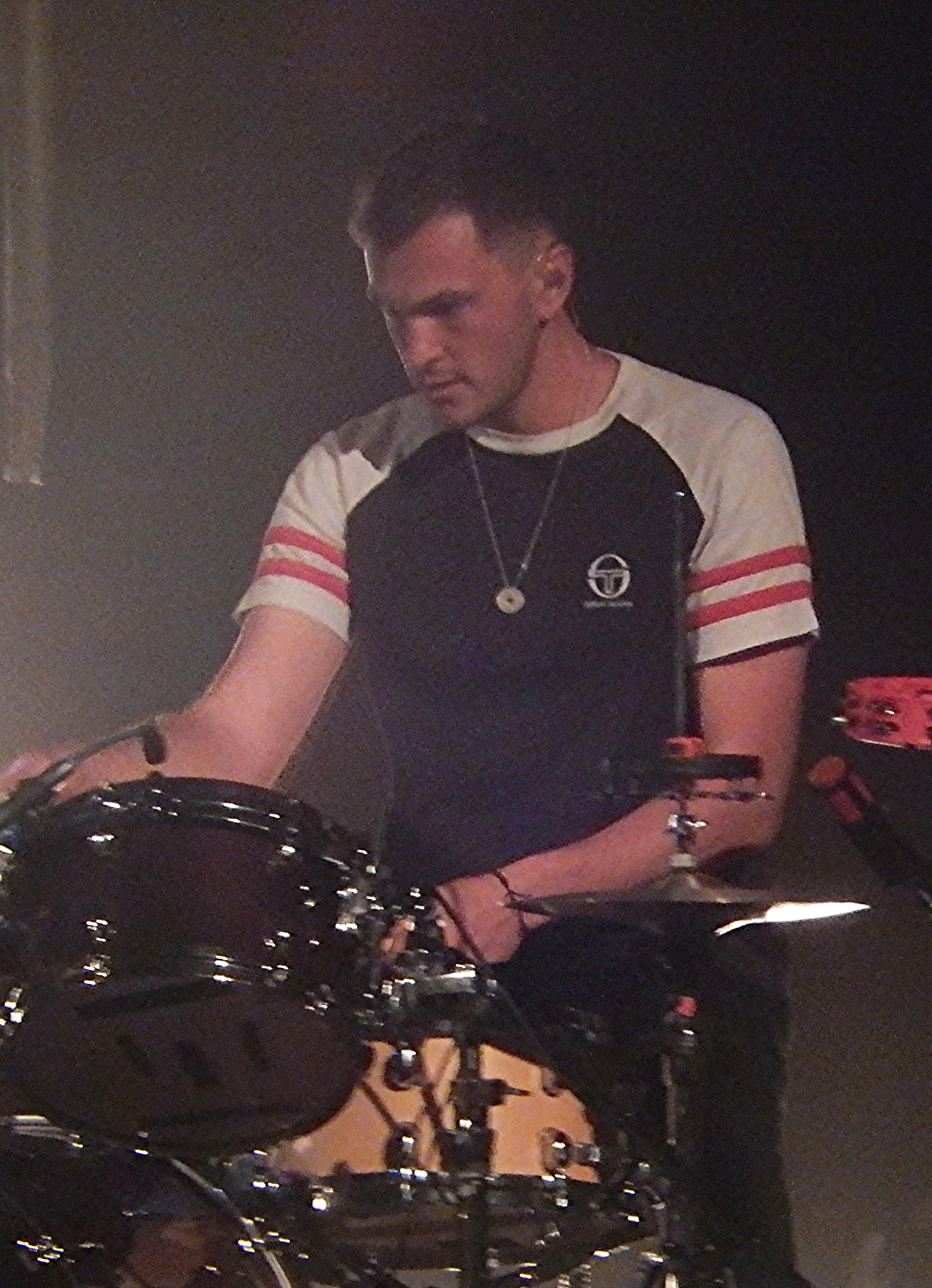
Dave Bayley (left) and Joe Seaward (right) of Glass Animals

While Seaward was in recovery, Bayley travelled repeatedly to Los Angeles. He was providing songwriting and production contributions to the music of other artists, including 6lack, King Princess, Khalid and DJ Dahi. While writing for other artists, Bayley learned how other artists wrote about themselves and he began writing lyrics with more personal themes. The positive reception to his more personal songwriting inspired Bayley to do the same in his own music for Glass Animals. The second Glass Animals record, How to Be a Human Being (2016), was a concept album featuring 11 songs with each song representing a person. The songs were inspired by people they met and stories they were told during their travels while promoting their debut album Zaba (2014). Bayley had mostly refused to write autobiographical songs before, using other real and fictional characters as his inspiration. However, the final track on How to Be a Human Being, "Agnes", was about a friend who committed suicide. Bayley told The Independent that writing "Agnes" "opened the door" to Dreamland.

Dreamland was recorded in London in 2019, with Seaward participating. Most of the album was formulated by Bayley, but his bandmates were responsible for some of the more technical performances on the album and were involved in deciding which songs to put on the album. Dreamland was almost entirely produced by Bayley, although he had assistance from the band's longtime mentor Paul Epworth. American hip hop record producer Mike Dean was also present during some of the album's recording. The album was mixed by Bayley, David Wrench, Manny Marroquin and MixedByAli.

== Music and lyrics ==
Dreamland was written and produced almost entirely by frontman Dave Bayley. The album's lyrics are highly autobiographical in nature, with many publications calling the album a "memoir". Dreamland is an exploration of Bayley's life from his first memories growing up in Texas up to his most recent. In a press release, Bayley said:

The idea of Dreamland is to go from my first memory up until now, through all the big realizations that happen in life. It's about the things that happened and the people that surrounded me in that time, good things, bad things, horrific things, funny things, confusing things, bits where I hated myself, bits where I hated other people, first loves, discovering sexuality, sadness, abandonment, mental health. It's just painting pictures of those moments and times that, looking back, make you who you are.

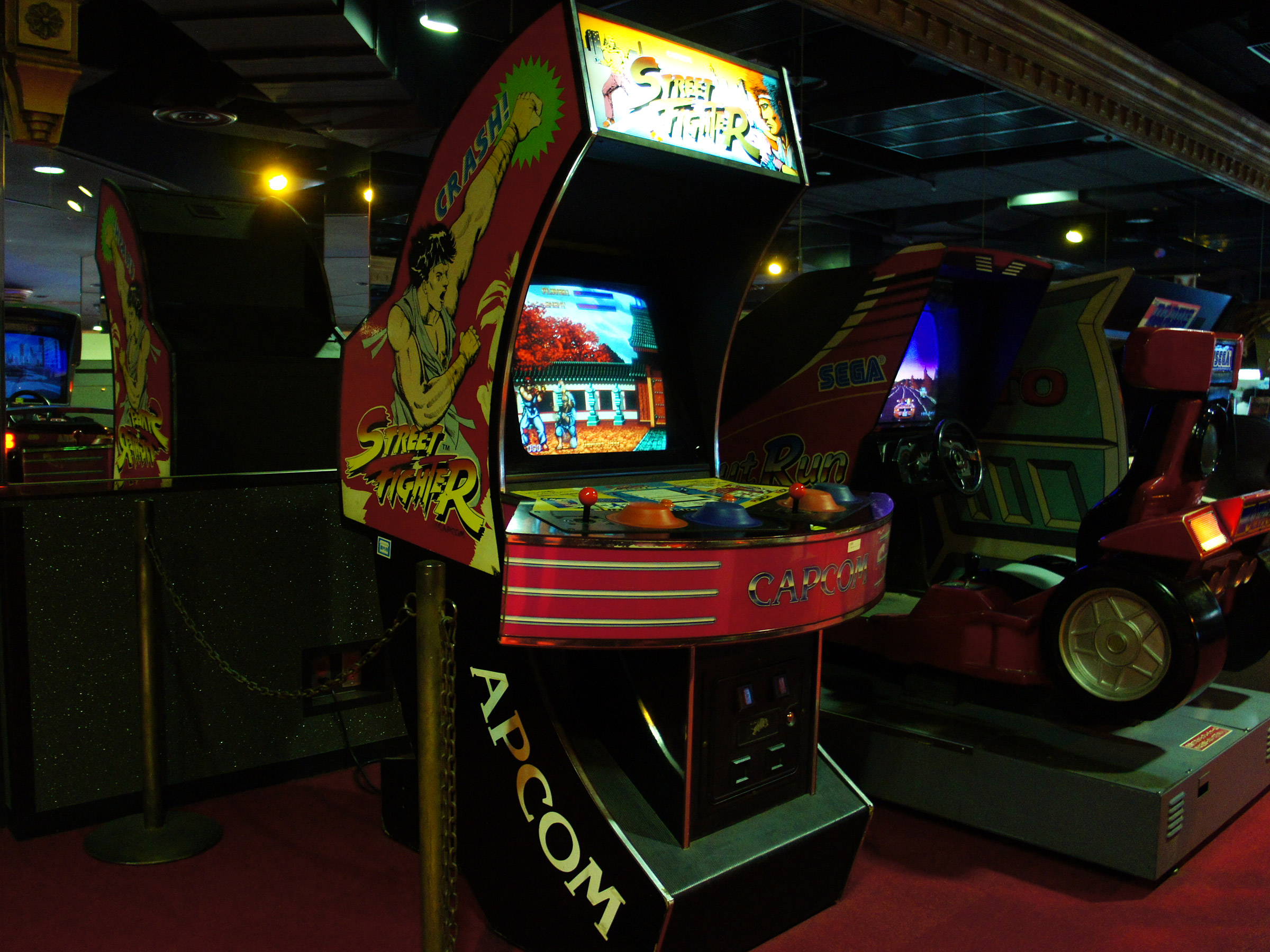
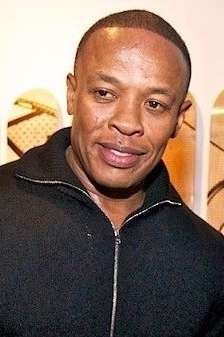
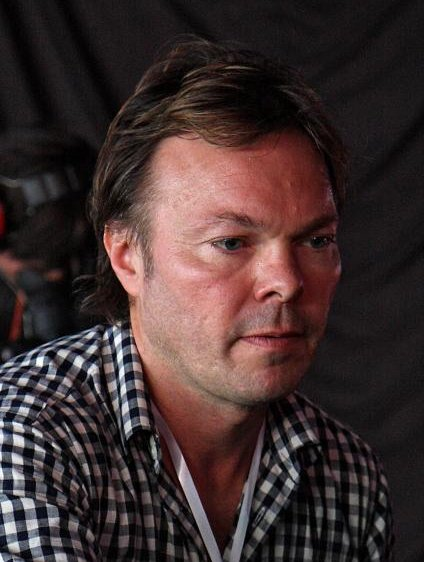
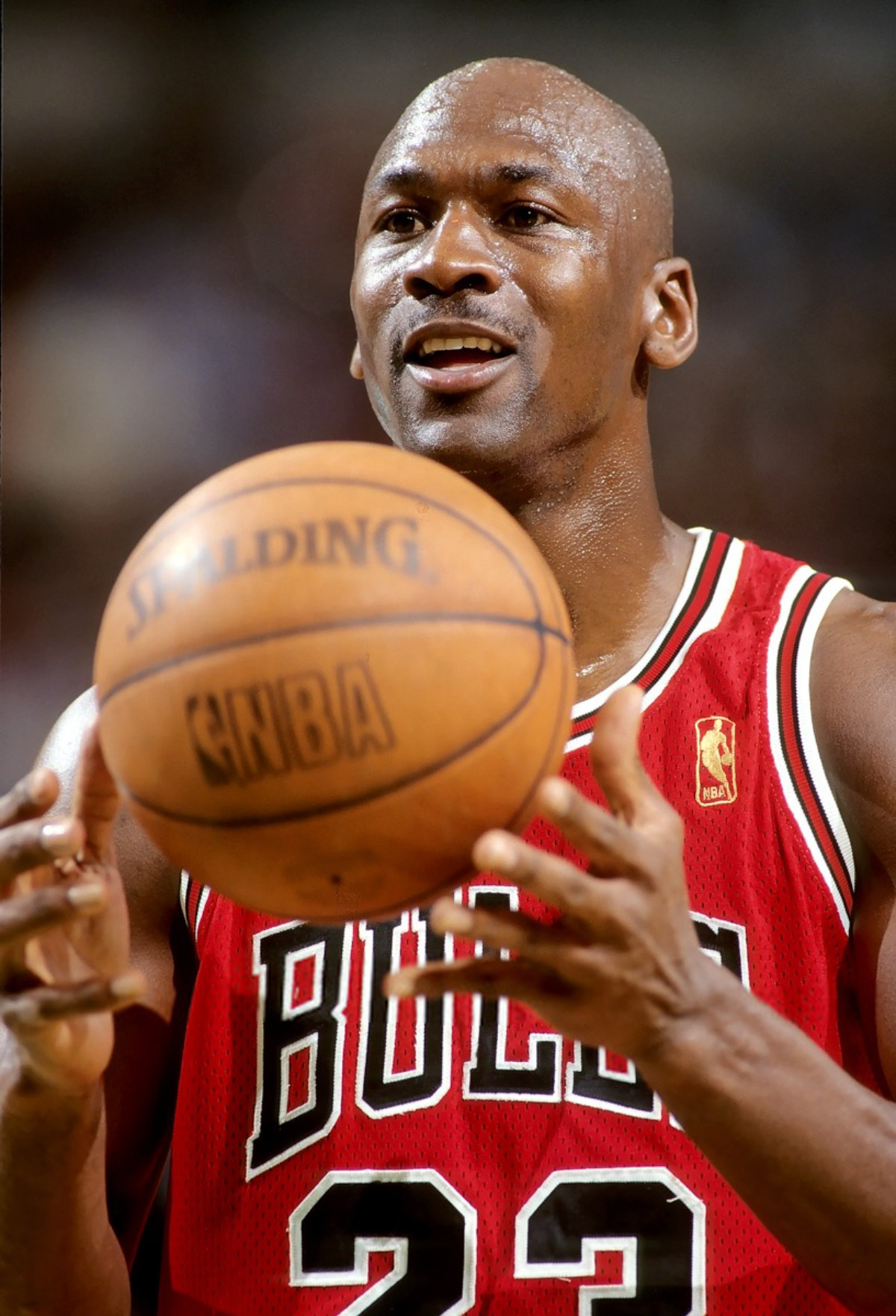
The album creates a sense of nostalgia for a 1990s and early 2000s childhood through its lyrical references, including (clockwise from top left) Street Fighter, Dr. Dre, Michael Jordan, Friends, and Pete Tong.

The album is structured around "home movie" interlude skits featuring audio from home movies that were videotaped by Bayley's mother Orit Braha during his childhood. The short interludes feature his mother stating the current date as 7 May 1994, discussing Sesame Street and rockets with Bayley, and laughing at Bayley putting his shoes on wrong. With his childhood in Texas as the album's backdrop, Bayley intended to create a "combination of sounds" that he grew up with as well as blending references to "what I was eating, watching on TV, what I would do in my spare time, who my friends were." Accordingly, the album features audio of children's voices and computer game sound effects. The lyrical references on the album include Memorex, Kodachrome, ice cream sandwiches, Mr. Miyagi, ramen noodles, Friends, Space Ghost Coast to Coast, Grand Theft Auto, Dr. Dre, Doom, Quake, the Geo Metro, Pokémon, bottle rockets, Dunkaroos, Capri Sun, kickball, GoldenEye 007, Hot Pockets, Street Fighter, Michael Jordan, Scottie Pippen, Pete Tong, G.I. Joe, Air Force 1s, Aquemini, Pepsi Blue, Scooby-Doo, Froot Loops and The Price Is Right.

The album's instrumentation and production borrow heavily from R&B, pop and hip hop from the early 2000s, as well as rock music of the 1960s. As a child in Texas, Bayley listened to a radio station that played hip hop songs by artists including Missy Elliott, Dr. Dre, Eminem and producer Timbaland. These artists influenced the music of Dreamland, as well as Talking Heads, The Beatles, The Beach Boys, Nina Simone, Otis Redding and Bob Marley, artists who Bayley gained an appreciation for from his parents. The Strokes and Radiohead also lend an influence to the melodies on Dreamland. The album's sound was shaped by its inspired recording process, which involved Bayley purchasing instruments that he felt The Beatles and The Beach Boys would have used and resampling them on samplers that Timbaland and Dr. Dre used. Conversely, Bayley also used samplers that Dr. Dre and Timbaland used and recorded them through tape machines and amplifiers that he felt the Beatles and Beach Boys would have used.

== Release and promotion ==
On 13 November 2019, Glass Animals released "Tokyo Drifting", a collaboration with American rapper Denzel Curry.

On 19 February 2020, the band released the single "Your Love (Déjà Vu)". On 1 May 2020, the band released a single named "Dreamland", and announced an album of the same name to be released on 10 July 2020. On 28 June 2020, the band announced that the album had been delayed to 7 August, in order to "keep focus on the Black Lives Matter movement and the discussions taking place around racism and police brutality around the world." On 29 June 2020, "Heat Waves" was released as a single. On 27 July 2020, the band shared a video of frontman Dave Bayley and guitarist Drew MacFarlane performing "Heat Waves" live under a Dreamland billboard on a street in the London Borough of Hackney. "It's All So Incredibly Loud" was released as a single on 31 July 2020.

In promotion of the album, the band redesigned their official website to look and operate like the desktop of a Windows 98 computer.

In October 2020, Glass Animals released a re-recorded new version of the track "Tangerine", this time with British singer Arlo Parks.

On 25 March 2021, a new version of "Heat Waves", this time with Puerto Rican rapper Iann Dior, was released.

On 13 May 2021, a music video for "Space Ghost Coast to Coast" was released. Inspired by video games, the surrealist video features Bailey dancing in a park around naked bodies. On 20 May 2021, a new version of "Space Ghost Coast to Coast", this time with British singer Bree Runway, was released.

=== Dreamland: The Home Movies ===
On 9 August 2020, the band premiered the "visual album" Dreamland: The Home Movies in a one-time YouTube livestream. The 45-minute long film was edited by guitarist Drew MacFarlane and contains footage from Bayley's home videos as well as unseen footage from throughout the band's career, and is soundtracked by the album. The next day, the film was put up for sale on the band's website in the form of VHS tapes that were handmade and packaged by members of the band.

== Artwork and packaging ==
Bayley conceptualised the cover artwork to feature objects from throughout his life scattered in the air, inspired by the I Spy children's book series. One of the band members suggested adding Bayley's head for the artwork to have a focus point. The band created all the artwork for the album in a computer programme which uses 3D graphics. The standard cover artwork features a floating 3D scan of Bayley's head around neon text and 3D objects. It was inspired by the 1980s and 1990s aesthetic employed in the vaporwave microgenre, and was intentionally designed to induce feelings of nostalgia.

The standard vinyl LP and the CD edition were issued with the standard cover artwork. Six limited-edition physical copies and a digital edition were all issued with alternative covers. The four different limited-edition cassettes were issued with four different colourways, each featuring one of the four 3D head scans of Glass Animals members Dave Bayley, Drew MacFarlane, Edmund Irwin-Singer and Joe Seaward. The limited-edition deluxe vinyl was issued as translucent vinyl LP with purple splatter. The limited-edition picture disc was issued as a vinyl LP featuring a zoetrope animation of a 3D head scan rotating. The album was also sold in limited edition in a compressed form on two floppy discs.

== Critical reception ==
Professional ratings
Aggregate scores
| Source | Rating |
|---|---|
| AnyDecentMusic? | 7.4/10 |
| Metacritic | 75/100 |
Review scores
| Source | Rating |
| AllMusic | 4/5 stars |
| Clash | 8/10 |
| DIY | 5/5 stars |
| Financial Times | 4/5 stars |
| The Guardian | 3/5 stars |
| The Independent | 4/5 stars |
| NME | 4/5 stars |
| Pitchfork | 5.7/10 |
| Q | 4/5 stars |
| Slant Magazine | 3/5 stars |

Dreamland received favourable reviews from music critics. The album has a score of 75 out of 100 on Metacritic, indicating "generally favorable reviews", based on 11 reviews.

Jenessa Williams of DIY gave the album a perfect score, calling it "Dave's opus" and praising the band for "pulling together all of their strengths and vulnerabilities". Robin Murray of Clash summarised it as a "record that balances its need for fresh innovation with an adherence to melody" and also praised the album's structure, calling it "superbly designed" between its main songs and interludes. Heather Phares of AllMusic praised Bayley's "fluency at melding R&B and hip-hop elements into Glass Animals' music" and called it the band's "most cohesive" album to date. Roisin O'Connor of The Independent praised the "analytical detail" in Bayley's lyrics about childhood for making Dreamland a "complex, thoughtful and moving record". Dave Everley of Q wrote, "The nostalgia would be overwhelming were it not for Bayley's ability to offset it with woozy, elastic beats". Hannah Mylrea of NME wrote that the album "is stuffed with effervescent nuggets of pop gold" and praised the "new strength and resilience" of Bayley's personal storytelling. Helena Wadia of the Evening Standard praised "Your Love (Déjà Vu)" and "Tokyo Drifting" as the album's "standout" tracks, but criticised the rest of the songs as "disappointing" in their blending into one another.

Aimee Cliff of The Guardian pointed to the production of "Tokyo Drifting" and the chorus of "Tangerine" as examples of the album bordering on "self-pastiche" at times, but nonetheless praised the "soft and searing" subject matter of "Domestic Bliss". In a mixed review, Charles Lyons-Burt of Slant Magazine criticised Dreamland's focus on Bayley's "mundane" realities and felt that Glass Animals' previous music which focused on the lives of others offered a "more enveloping experience, fleshing out imagined places and people with an intrigue that's missing here." Ian Cohen of Pitchfork criticised Bayley's shift to autobiographical lyrics and wrote, "Dreamland falls prey to the unfortunate mode of modern branding that conflates personal nostalgia with making a point."

== Track listing ==
All tracks are written and produced by Dave Bayley, except where noted.

Dreamland track listing
| No. | Title | Writer(s) | Producer(s) | Length |
|---|---|---|---|---|
| 1. | "Dreamland" | | | 3:23 |
| 2. | "Tangerine" | Dave Bayley; Paul Epworth; Brittany Hazzard | | 3:20 |
| 3. | "((Home Movie: 1994))" | Bayley; Orit Braha | | 0:07 |
| 4. | "Hot Sugar" | Bayley; Ann Bridgeforth; Dave Hamilton; Rony Darrel | | 3:54 |
| 5. | "((Home Movie: BTX))" | | | 0:13 |
| 6. | "Space Ghost Coast to Coast" | | | 3:07 |
| 7. | "Tokyo Drifting" (with Denzel Curry) | Bayley; Caiphus Semenya; Denzel Curry | | 3:36 |
| 8. | "Melon and the Coconut" | | | 2:28 |
| 9. | "Your Love (Déjà Vu)" | | Bayley; Paul Epworth^{[a]} | 3:54 |
| 10. | "Waterfalls Coming Out Your Mouth" | | | 2:41 |
| 11. | "It's All So Incredibly Loud" | | | 4:19 |
| 12. | "((Home Movie: Rockets))" | | | 1:00 |
| 13. | "Domestic Bliss" | | | 3:18 |
| 14. | "Heat Waves" | | | 3:58 |
| 15. | "((Home Movie: Shoes On))" | | | 0:31 |
| 16. | "Helium^{[+]}" | | | 5:28 |
| Total length: | | | | 45:17 |

Dreamland (+ Bonus Levels)
| No. | Title | Length |
|---|---|---|
| 1. | "Heat Waves" (Diplo Remix) | 2:21 |
| 2. | "Heat Waves" (Shakur Ahmad Remix) | 3:18 |

Dreamland (+ Bonus Levels 2.0)
| No. | Title | Length |
|---|---|---|
| 17. | "I Don't Wanna Talk (I Just Wanna Dance)" | 3:15 |

Dreamland: Real Life Edition
| No. | Title | Writer(s) | Producer(s) | Length |
|---|---|---|---|---|
| 17. | "Heat Waves" (Stripped Back) | | | 3:14 |
| 18. | "Space Ghost Coast to Coast" (Stripped Back) | | | 3:02 |
| 19. | "Your Love (Déjà Vu)" (Stripped Back) | | | 4:09 |
| 20. | "I Don't Wanna Talk (I Just Wanna Dance)" (with Albert Hammond Jr.) | | | 4:14 |
| 21. | "Tangerine" (with Arlo Parks) | Dave Bayley; Paul Epworth; Brittany Hazzard | Bayley; Epworth | 3:27 |
| 22. | "Space Ghost Coast to Coast" (with Bree Runway) | Bayley; Bree Runway | | 2:56 |
| 23. | "Heat Waves" (Shakur Ahmad Remix) | | Bayley; Epworth | 3:18 |
| 24. | "Tokyo Drifting" (with Denzel Curry) (Oliver Malcolm Remix) | Bayley; Caiphus Semenya; Denzel Curry | | 2:52 |
| 25. | "Heat Waves" (Diplo Remix) | | Bayley; Epworth | 2:22 |

Notes

- ^{^[a]} signifies a co-producer.

+ "Helium" contains the hidden track "(Home Movie: Are You Watching TV)"

- "Hot Sugar" contains a sample of "Deep Shadows", written by Ann Bridgeforth, Dave Hamilton and Rony Darrel and performed by Little Ann.
- "Tokyo Drifting" contains elements from "Mahlalela (Lazy Bones)", written by Caiphus Semenya and performed by Letta Mbulu.

== Personnel ==
Credits adapted from the album's liner notes.

=== Musicians ===
Glass Animals

- Dave Bayley – vocals (1, 2, 4, 6–11, 13–16), vocal bass (1, 6, 13), keyboards (1, 3–5, 8, 10, 11, 13–16), guitar (4, 6, 8, 10, 11, 13–16), drums (1, 4, 6–11, 13–16), synthesizer (4, 7, 9, 14), percussion (11, 13, 15), strings (1, 2, 4, 7, 9, 11–16), mixing (3, 5, 12, 15), programming (1, 4, 6–16)
- Andrew MacFarlane – strings (2, 11, 12, 13, 14), guitar (6, 10, 14, 16), keyboards (6, 9, 13), programming (12, 13, 14)
- Edmund Irwin Singer – guitar (6, 14, 16), keyboards (9), vocal bass (10), strings (12), synthesizer (13), programming (12, 13, 14)
- Joe Seaward – drums (9, 14), percussion (11)

Additional musicians

- Paul Epworth – percussion (11), strings (2), synthesizer (6)
- David Wrench – programming (1, 8, 10, 11, 13, 16)
- Orit Braha – vocals (3)
- Denzel Curry – vocals (7)
- Letta Mbulu – vocals (7)

=== Technical ===
- Dave Bayley – production (all tracks), recording engineer (all tracks)
- Paul Epworth – co-production (9)
- David Wrench – mixing (1, 8, 10, 11, 13, 16)
- Manny Marroquin – mixing (2, 4, 9, 14)
- Derek "MixedByAli" Ali – mixing (6)
- David Nakaji – mixing (7)
- Riley McIntyre – recording engineer (1–6, 8–16)
- Luke Pickering – assistant recording engineer (1–6, 8–16)
- Chloe Kramer – assistant recording engineer (1–6, 8–16)
- Chris Galland – mix engineer (2, 4, 14)
- Curtis "Sircut" Bye – assistant mixer (6)
- Cyrus "NOIS" Taghipour – assistant mixer (6)
- Jeremie Inhaber – assistant mixer (2, 4, 14)
- Robin Florent – assistant mixer (2, 4, 14)
- Scott Desmarais – assistant mixer (2, 4, 14)
- Chris Gehringer – mastering (1–6, 8–16)
- Mike Bozzi – mastering (7)

== Charts ==
=== Weekly charts ===
Weekly chart performance for Dreamland
| Chart (2020–2021) | Peak position |
|---|---|
| Australian Albums (ARIA) | 6 |
| Austrian Albums (Ö3 Austria) | 69 |
| Belgian Albums (Ultratop Flanders) | 32 |
| Belgian Albums (Ultratop Wallonia) | 106 |
| Canadian Albums (Billboard) | 13 |
| Dutch Albums (Album Top 100) | 15 |
| German Albums (Offizielle Top 100) | 43 |
| Irish Albums (Official Charts) | 8 |
| New Zealand Albums (RMNZ) | 8 |
| Scottish Albums (Official Charts) | 3 |
| Swiss Albums (Schweizer Hitparade) | 51 |
| UK Albums (Official Charts) | 2 |
| US Billboard 200 | 7 |
| US Top Rock Albums (Billboard) | 1 |

=== Year-end charts ===
2020 year-end chart performance for Dreamland
| Chart (2020) | Position |
|---|---|
| US Top Rock Albums (Billboard) | 46 |

2021 year-end chart performance for Dreamland
| Chart (2021) | Position |
|---|---|
| Australian Albums (ARIA) | 87 |
| Dutch Albums (Album Top 100) | 84 |
| US Billboard 200 | 87 |
| US Top Rock Albums (Billboard) | 9 |

2022 year-end chart performance for Dreamland
| Chart (2022) | Position |
|---|---|
| Canadian Albums (Billboard) | 28 |
| Dutch Albums (Album Top 100) | 72 |
| US Billboard 200 | 64 |
| US Top Rock Albums (Billboard) | 7 |

== Certifications ==
Sales certifications for Dreamland
| Region | Certification | Certified units/sales |
|---|---|---|
| Australia (ARIA) | Gold | 35,000^{‡} |
| Brazil (Pro-Música Brasil) | 2× Platinum | 80,000^{‡} |
| Brazil (Pro-Música Brasil) (+Bonus Levels 2.0) | 2× Platinum | 80,000^{‡} |
| Canada (Music Canada) | Platinum | 80,000^{‡} |
| Denmark (IFPI Danmark) | Gold | 10,000^{‡} |
| Poland (ZPAV) | 2× Platinum | 40,000^{‡} |
| United Kingdom (BPI) | Gold | 100,000^{‡} |
| United States (RIAA) | Gold | 500,000^{‡} |
^{‡} Sales+streaming figures based on certification alone.
