= Together Again (Tony Bennett and Bill Evans album) =

Studio album by Tony Bennett and Bill Evans
- Released: 1977
- Recorded: September 27–30, 1976
- Studios: Columbia (San Francisco, California)
- Genre: Vocal jazz
- Length: 35:05
- Labels: Improv Records; Improv 7117
- Producers: Helen Keane; Don Cody

Tony Bennett chronology
The Tony Bennett/Bill Evans Album (1975)	Together Again (1977)	Tony Bennett with the McPartlands and Friends Make Magnificent Music (1977)

Bill Evans chronology
Alone (Again) (1975)	Together Again (1977)	Crosscurrents (1977)

Together Again is a 1977 studio album by singer Tony Bennett and jazz pianist Bill Evans. It was originally issued on Bennett's own Improv Records label, which went out of business later that year, but was subsequently reissued on Concord.

Their first album together, The Tony Bennett/Bill Evans Album, had been released by Fantasy Records in 1975. Both albums plus alternate takes and additional tracks were later released as The Complete Tony Bennett/Bill Evans Recordings by Fantasy in 2009.

On November 8, 2011, Sony Music Distribution included the CD in a box set entitled The Complete Collection.

== Repertoire ==
The album opens with a brief solo by Evans on David Raksin's theme "The Bad and the Beautiful" from the film of that title.

As with the previous collaboration, this one features a song by Leonard Bernstein, "Lucky to Be Me," that Evans had previously recorded solo for the album Everybody Digs Bill Evans (1958). He had also previously recorded a vocal version of it with Monica Zetterlund in 1964. And as with its predecessor, it contains one Evans original, in this case, "The Two Lonely People," which Evans had first presented on The Bill Evans Album (1971), although earlier live recordings of it were later issued.

There are also performances of what were quickly becoming important modern jazz standards, "A Child Is Born" by Thad Jones, which Evans had recorded with a quintet just a few months earlier for the album Quintessence, and Michel Legrand's "You Must Believe in Spring," which would later be featured as the title track of one of Evans's most acclaimed trio albums.

Bennett had made the original recording of the song "Maybe September" back in 1966 for The Movie Song Album. The new collaboration was rounded out by four other jazz standards.

== Critical reception ==
Professional ratings
Review scores
Source	Rating
AllMusic	3/5 stars
The Penguin Guide to Jazz Recordings	3/4 stars
The Rolling Stone Album Guide	4/5 stars
The Encyclopedia of Popular Music	3/5 stars

The AllMusic reviewer William Ruhlman wrote, "If anything, Evans dominates this encounter more than he did the first, but it's still a good showcase for Bennett, too." Evans biographer Peter Pettinger said, "the two artists produced a recording at least as relaxed and mutually in tune as their first" and singled out the "hushed rendering of one of Michel Legrand's finest songs, 'You Must Believe in Spring.'"

== Track listing ==
1. "The Bad and the Beautiful" (Dory Langdon, David Raksin) – 2:18
2. "Lucky to Be Me" (Leonard Bernstein, Betty Comden, Adolph Green) – 3:45
3. "Make Someone Happy" (Betty Comden, Adolph Green, Jule Styne) – 3:53
4. "You're Nearer" (Lorenz Hart, Richard Rodgers) – 2:23
5. "A Child Is Born" (Thad Jones, Alec Wilder) – 3:17
6. "The Two Lonely People" (Bill Evans, Carol Hall) – 4:27
7. "You Don't Know What Love Is" (Gene de Paul, Don Raye) – 3:27
8. "Maybe September" (Ray Evans, Percy Faith, Jay Livingston) – 3:55
9. "Lonely Girl" (Ray Evans, Jay Livingston, Neal Hefti) – 2:49
10. "You Must Believe in Spring" (Michel Legrand, Alan Bergman, Marilyn Bergman, Jacques Demy) – 5:51

Bonus tracks on CD reissue:

11. "Who Can I Turn To (When Nobody Needs Me)" (Leslie Bricusse, Anthony Newley) – 2:28
12. "Dream Dancing" (Cole Porter) – 3:46

== Personnel ==
- Tony Bennett - vocals (except track 1)
- Bill Evans - piano
