= Greatest Hits (Marvin Gaye album) =

Greatest hits album by Marvin Gaye
- Released: 1964
- Recorded: 1961–1963 at Hitsville USA, Detroit
- Genre: R&B, soul
- Length: 30:58
- Label: Tamla; T252
- Producer: William "Mickey" Stevenson, Brian Holland, Lamont Dozier

Marvin Gaye chronology
When I'm Alone I Cry (1964)	Greatest Hits (1964)	Together (1964)

Greatest Hits is a 1964 greatest hits album, the first for American R&B-soul singer Marvin Gaye, released on the Tamla label. Released during Gaye's first period of success, it was also his first charted album as a solo artist after making his album chart debut with the Mary Wells duet album, Together, the same year.

Three of the singles, "Sandman", "Can I Get a Witness" (also featuring that song's B-side, "I'm Crazy 'bout My Baby"), and "You're a Wonderful One", were non-album tracks that made it to release on this particular album.

== Track listing ==
=== Side one ===
1. "Can I Get a Witness" (Brian Holland, Lamont Dozier, Eddie Holland) – 2:46
2. "You're a Wonderful One" (Holland, Dozier, Holland) – 2:48
3. "Stubborn Kind of Fellow" (Marvin Gaye, George Gordy, Mickey Stevenson) – 2:45
4. "I'm Crazy 'bout My Baby" (Stevenson) – 2:43
5. "Pride and Joy" (Gaye, Norman Whitfield, Stevenson) – 2:08
6. "Hitch Hike" (Gaye, Clarence Paul, Stevenson) – 2:30

=== Side two ===
1. "Sandman" (Pat Ballard) – 2:31
2. "Hello There Angel" (Stevenson, Berry Gordy) – 2:44
3. "One of These Days" (Stevenson) – 2:59
4. "I'm Yours, You're Mine" (Stevenson, Gordy) – 1:55
5. "Taking My Time" (Stevenson, Gordy) – 2:29
6. "It Hurt Me Too" (Gaye, Stevenson, Ricardo) – 2:43

== Personnel ==
- Marvin Gaye – lead vocals, piano, drums
- Martha and the Vandellas – background vocals
- The Temptations – background vocals
- The Supremes – background vocals
- Four Tops – background vocals
- Holland–Dozier–Holland – background vocals
- The Andantes – background vocals
- The Miracles – background vocals
- The Funk Brothers – instrumentation
