= The Tony Bennett/Bill Evans Album =

1975 studio album by Tony Bennett and Bill Evans

The Tony Bennett Bill Evans Album

Studio album by Tony Bennett, Bill Evans
- Released: July 1975
- Recorded: June 10–13, 1975
- Studio: Fantasy (Berkeley, California)
- Genre: Vocal jazz
- Length: 34:59
- Labels: Fantasy; F-9489
- Producer: Helen Keane

Tony Bennett chronology
Life is Beautiful (1975)	The Tony Bennett Bill Evans Album (1975)	Together Again (1977)

Bill Evans chronology
Intuition (1975)	The Tony Bennett Bill Evans Album (1975)	Montreux III (1975)

Professional ratings
Review scores
Source	Rating
All About Jazz	(favorable)
AllMusic	4.5/5 stars
The Penguin Guide to Jazz Recordings	4/4 stars
The Encyclopedia of Popular Music	4/5 stars

The Tony Bennett Bill Evans Album is a 1975 studio album by singer Tony Bennett and pianist Bill Evans.

Their second album together, Together Again, was released in 1977. Both albums plus alternate takes and additional tracks were released on The Complete Tony Bennett/Bill Evans Recordings by Fantasy Records in 2009.

On November 8, 2011, Sony Music Distribution included the CD in a box set entitled The Complete Collection.

== Background ==
The singer Annie Ross suggested to Bennett that he should make an album with Evans. Since the managers of the two artists, Jack Rollins and Helen Keane, respectively, were close friends, the collaboration was readily negotiated for Fantasy Records, Evans's label at the time. Evans commented, "I like Tony's singing. To me, he is one of those guys that keep developing—digging deeper into their resources." Evans and Bennett met in London to establish the recording dates and decide on the repertoire. Bennett said that Evans worked "for three or four hours on each song we did .... I couldn't believe what he was doing, over and over again, each thing was magnificent." Later, Bennett said of the album, "That's the most prestigious thing I ever did."

== Repertoire ==
Peter Pettinger notes that "Most of the titles on this now classic recording were firm favorites of Evans's." Evans had previously recorded the opener, "Young and Foolish", as well as Leonard Bernstein's "Some Other Time" for his second trio album, Everybody Digs Bill Evans (1958). He recorded "The Touch of Your Lips" several times, including just a few months later for the solo album Alone (Again). A classic trio version of "My Foolish Heart" was recorded during Evans's legendary live Village Vanguard recordings in 1961. "But Beautiful," reportedly Evans's favorite song, had previously been recorded by Evans with Stan Getz twice and live with his trio for the album Since We Met (1974). This album with Bennett also features a version of Evans's most famous original, "Waltz for Debby," which Bennett had previously recorded in 1964, much to Evans's delight. This is the only time that Evans recorded it with the lyrics by his friend Gene Lees; previously, he had recorded the Swedish version with Monica Zetterlund.

== Reception ==
All About Jazz reviewer C. Michael Bailey commented, "These two exceptional musicians came together at the top of their game to record one of the most memorable vocal-piano duets committed to vinyl. ... This is a superb reissue that demands to be heard."

Pettinger notes that Evans "was one of the most accomplished and sensitive accompanists in the business. His backings made much use of that quietly processional chord technique ... that he had employed on Undercurrent with Jim Hall. ... The pianist reveled in fulfilling the orchestral support to which the singer was accustomed, and undoubtedly both were having a grand time."

Will Friedwald observes that "Instead of the singer being accompanied by the pianist ... both participants [on this album] are equal partners."

Ted Gioia praised this performance of "Waltz for Debby" for "the vocalist's touching delivery of Gene Lees' lyrics" and "because this track gives us a rare chance to hear the pianist solo over the changes in 3/4" instead of his usual practice of shifting to 4/4 for his improvisations on the waltz.

== Track listing ==
1. "Young and Foolish" (Albert Hague, Arnold B. Horwitt) – 3:54
2. "The Touch of Your Lips" (Ray Noble) – 3:56
3. "Some Other Time" (Leonard Bernstein, Betty Comden, Adolph Green) – 4:42
4. "When in Rome" (Cy Coleman, Carolyn Leigh) – 2:55
5. "We'll Be Together Again" (Carl T. Fischer, Frankie Laine) – 4:38
6. "My Foolish Heart" (Ned Washington, Victor Young) – 4:51
7. "Waltz for Debby" (Bill Evans, Gene Lees) – 4:04
8. "But Beautiful" (Johnny Burke, Jimmy Van Heusen) – 3:36
9. "Days of Wine and Roses" (Henry Mancini, Johnny Mercer) – 2:23

== Personnel ==
- Tony Bennett – vocals
- Bill Evans – piano
