= Pork Soda (disambiguation) =

Pork Soda is a 1993 album by Primus.

Pork Soda may also refer to:

- "Pork Soda", a song by Glass Animals from their 2016 album How to Be a Human Being
- Pork Soda, a 2014 EP by Groove Armada
- Pork Soda, a song by The Headhunters from their 1977 album Straight From The Gate
