= I Love You So F***ing Much =

Studio album by Glass Animals
- Released: 19 July 2024
- Length: 40:41
- Label: Polydor
- Producer: Dave Bayley

Glass Animals chronology
Dreamland (2020)	I Love You So F***ing Much (2024)

Singles from I Love You So F***ing Much
- 1. "Creatures in Heaven" Released: 3 April 2024; 2. "A Tear in Space (Airlock)" Released: 7 June 2024; 3. "Show Pony" Released: 19 July 2024; 4. "Wonderful Nothing" Released: 6 September 2024

I Love You So F***ing Much is the fourth studio album by English indie rock band Glass Animals, released on 19 July 2024 through Polydor Records. It was preceded by two singles; "Creatures in Heaven", released on 3 April 2024, and "A Tear in Space (Airlock)", released on 7 June 2024. Much like Glass Animals' previous albums, this one follows a theme. In this case, the complex and emotional ramifications of love. The album received mixed reviews from critics.

== Background ==
The album was partly inspired by the success of "Heat Waves" in 2020, with frontman Dave Bayley saying that "sometimes you aren't able to change as quickly on a personal level". He explained that success can leave one feeling like a "spectator" with accompanying expectations to act a certain way, which "confused [him] to the point of not knowing who [he] was or if anything was real". The title is about the power and mystery of human connection in a universe that "may make us feel overwhelmingly small". Bayley also explained that the lead single "Creatures in Heaven" is about "a moment in time [...] having the capacity to be enormously formative and life-changing".

== Promotion ==
The album was promoted with a concert tour entitled “The Tour of Earth”, which started on 4 August 2024 in Charlotte, North Carolina, US and ended on 17 August 2025 in Stateline, Nevada, US. Opening acts for the tour include Kevin Abstract, Eyedress, Blondshell, The Big Moon, and Sofia Isella.

== Reception ==
Professional ratings
Aggregate scores
Source	Rating
Metacritic	61/100
Review scores
Source	Rating
The Independent	7/10
Dork	5/5
DIY	4.5/5
AllMusic	4/5
The Line of Best Fit	8/10
The Telegraph	4/5
Rolling Stone	4/5
Clash	7/10
Exclaim!	4/10
The Guardian	2/5
The Observer	2/5
Far Out	1/5

At Metacritic, which aggregates scores from mainstream critics and assigns a weighted average, I Love You So F***ing Much has an average score of 61 based on 10 reviews, indicating "generally favourable" reviews.

== Track listing ==
All tracks are written by Dave Bayley.

I Love You So F***ing Much track listing
No.	Title	Length
1.	"Show Pony"	4:15
2.	"Whatthehellishappening?"	3:44
3.	"Creatures in Heaven"	3:41
4.	"Wonderful Nothing"	4:24
5.	"A Tear in Space (Airlock)"	3:23
6.	"I Can't Make You Fall in Love Again"	4:48
7.	"How I Learned to Love the Bomb"	4:09
8.	"White Roses"	3:37
9.	"On the Run"	4:34
10.	"Lost in the Ocean"	4:06
Total length:		40:41

=== Notes ===
- "Whatthehellishappening" is stylised as "whatthehellishappening?".

== Personnel ==
Glass Animals

- Dave Bayley – lead vocals, drums, guitar, keyboards, percussion, programming, sequencer, synthesizer, production, engineering (all tracks); bass guitar (tracks 1, 2, 4, 7, 9, 10), string arrangement (4)
- Andrew MacFarlane – keyboards, programming, synthesizer, engineering (all tracks); string arrangement (tracks 1, 3–6, 9), guitar (2, 3), percussion (9)
- Edmund Irwin-Singer – keyboards, programming, synthesizer, engineering (all tracks); bass guitar (tracks 2, 5–7, 9, 10)
- Joe Seaward – percussion (all tracks), drums (tracks 1–7, 9, 10)

Additional musicians

- Leos Strings – strings (tracks 1, 3–6, 8–10)
  - Rachel Shakespeare – cello
  - Andy Crick – cello
  - Jordan Bowron – viola
  - Rhiannon Fallows – viola
  - Jody Smith – violin
  - Sarah Thornett – violin
  - Su Sturman – violin
  - Matthew Chadbond – violin
  - Lucy McKay – violin
  - Elaine Ambridge – violin
  - Laurie Dempsey – violin

Technical

- Chris Gehringer – mastering
- Manny Marroquin – mixing
- Matt Wiggins – engineering
- Anthony Vilchis – mix engineering
- Trey Station – mix engineering
- Will Quinnell – mastering assistance

== Charts ==
Chart performance for I Love You So F***ing Much
Chart (2024)	Peak position
Australian Albums (ARIA)	5
Austrian Albums (Ö3 Austria)	24
Belgian Albums (Ultratop Flanders)	34
Belgian Albums (Ultratop Wallonia)	90
Dutch Albums (Album Top 100)	20
German Albums (Offizielle Top 100)	19
Irish Albums (Official Charts)	44
Lithuanian Albums (AGATA)	44
New Zealand Albums (RMNZ)	7
Polish Albums (ZPAV)	99
Scottish Albums (Official Charts)	5
UK Albums (Official Charts)	5
US Billboard 200	11
US Top Rock Albums (Billboard)	3
US Top Alternative Albums (Billboard)	3
