= What's the Matter with You Baby =

Single by Marvin Gaye and Mary Wells

from the album Together
- A-side: "Once Upon a Time"
- Released: 1964
- Recorded: Hitsville USA, Detroit, Michigan; 1963
- Genre: Rhythm and blues
- Length: 2:24
- Label: Motown
- Songwriters: William "Mickey" Stevenson; Clarence Paul; Barney Ales
- Producer: Mickey Stevenson

Marvin Gaye singles chronology
| "Once Upon a Time" (1964) | "What's the Matter with You Baby" (1964) | "Try It Baby" (1964) |

Mary Wells singles chronology
| "Once Upon a Time" (1964) | "What's the Matter with You Baby" (1964) | "Ain't It the Truth" (1964) |

"What's the Matter with You Baby" is a 1964 single written by William "Mickey" Stevenson, Clarence Paul, and Barney Ales and produced by Stevenson. It was recorded and released by Marvin Gaye and Mary Wells on the Motown label. Released as a double A-side single alongside "Once Upon a Time", the song gave Gaye and Wells another charted smash.

== Background ==
The song has Gaye and Wells going back and forth with Gaye apologizing to Wells for leaving her behind for someone else begging Wells to give him one more chance. At first, Wells says taking Gaye back would "hurt (her) pride" and that she cannot let him take her out for the night but after Gaye pleads for Wells to come back to him, Wells relents but still passes on him taking her out for the night. The song begins and ends with the two harmonizing together.

== Chart performance ==
"What's the Matter with You Baby" peaked at number seventeen on the U.S. Pop Singles chart when released. On Cash Box "Top 50 in R&B Locations", the song went to number two.

| Chart (1964) | Peak position |
|---|---|
| U.S. Billboard Hot 100 | 17 |

== Personnel ==
- All vocals by Marvin Gaye and Mary Wells
- Produced by William "Mickey" Stevenson
- Instrumentation by The Funk Brothers
