= Quintessence (Bill Evans album) =

Studio album by Bill Evans
- Released: August–September 1977
- Recorded: May 27–30, 1976
- Studio: Fantasy Studios, Berkeley
- Genre: Jazz, post-bop, cool jazz
- Length: 42:56 (reissue)
- Label: Fantasy F-9529; CD: Original Jazz Classics OJCCD 698-2
- Producer: Helen Keane

Bill Evans chronology
Alone (Again) (1975)	Quintessence (1977)	Together Again (1976)

Quintessence is an album by American jazz pianist Bill Evans. It was recorded in 1976 for Fantasy Records and released the following year. At this time usually playing solo or with his trio, for these sessions Evans was the leader of an all-star quintet featuring Harold Land on tenor saxophone, guitarist Kenny Burrell, Ray Brown on bass, and Philly Joe Jones on drums.

Evans had never previously worked with Land, Burrell, or Brown, but the quintet instrumentation, with tenor sax and guitar, mirrors that of the second Interplay session of 1962. One track, "The Second Time Around," is played by trio only. As with many Evans albums from this period, it includes a selection by Michel Legrand, in this case "Martina," which Barbra Streisand had recorded in 1965.

== Reception ==
Professional ratings
Review scores
Source	Rating
AllMusic	3/5 stars
The Penguin Guide to Jazz Recordings	2.5/4 stars
The Rolling Stone Jazz Record Guide	4/5 stars

Writing for AllMusic, Scott Yanow called the album "a nice change of pace ... tasteful and explorative in a subtle way."

Biographer Keith Shadwick notes that Evans here "seems mostly concerned with being a pianist within a group rather than leading it by example, and the resulting album sounds very much a co-operative effort. ... Perhaps [Evans's] best and most concentrated playing comes on Thad Jones's ballad 'A Child Is Born' where he presents the first three minutes of the performance as a piano-trio arrangement, including a piano solo, before Kenny Burrell's entry." Shadwick also notes that even though the album did not "set out to make a Significant Statement," it was nonetheless "a relaxed and rewarding quintet session and one of the highlights in Evans's later recording career" and that the pun of the album's title is "typical of Evans's penchant for wordplay."

== Track listing ==
1. "Sweet Dulcinea Blue" (Kenny Wheeler) – 6:02
2. "Martina" (Michel Legrand, Eddy Marnay, Hal Shaper) – 8:12
3. "Second Time Around" (Jimmy Van Heusen, Sammy Cahn) – 3:41
4. "A Child Is Born" (Thad Jones, Alec Wilder) – 7:30
5. "Bass Face" (Kenny Burrell) – 10:04

CD reissue bonus track:

6. "Nobody Else but Me" (Jerome Kern, Oscar Hammerstein II) – 7:27

== Personnel ==
- Bill Evans – piano
- Harold Land – tenor saxophone
- Kenny Burrell – guitar
- Ray Brown – bass
- Philly Joe Jones – drums

=== Technical personnel ===
- Helen Keane – producer
- Phil Kaffel – engineer
- Phil DeLancie – remastering
- Galen Rowell – cover photo
- Phil Bray – booklet photos

== Chart positions ==
Year	Chart	Position
1977	Billboard Jazz Albums	20
