= Glass Animals =

English indie rock band

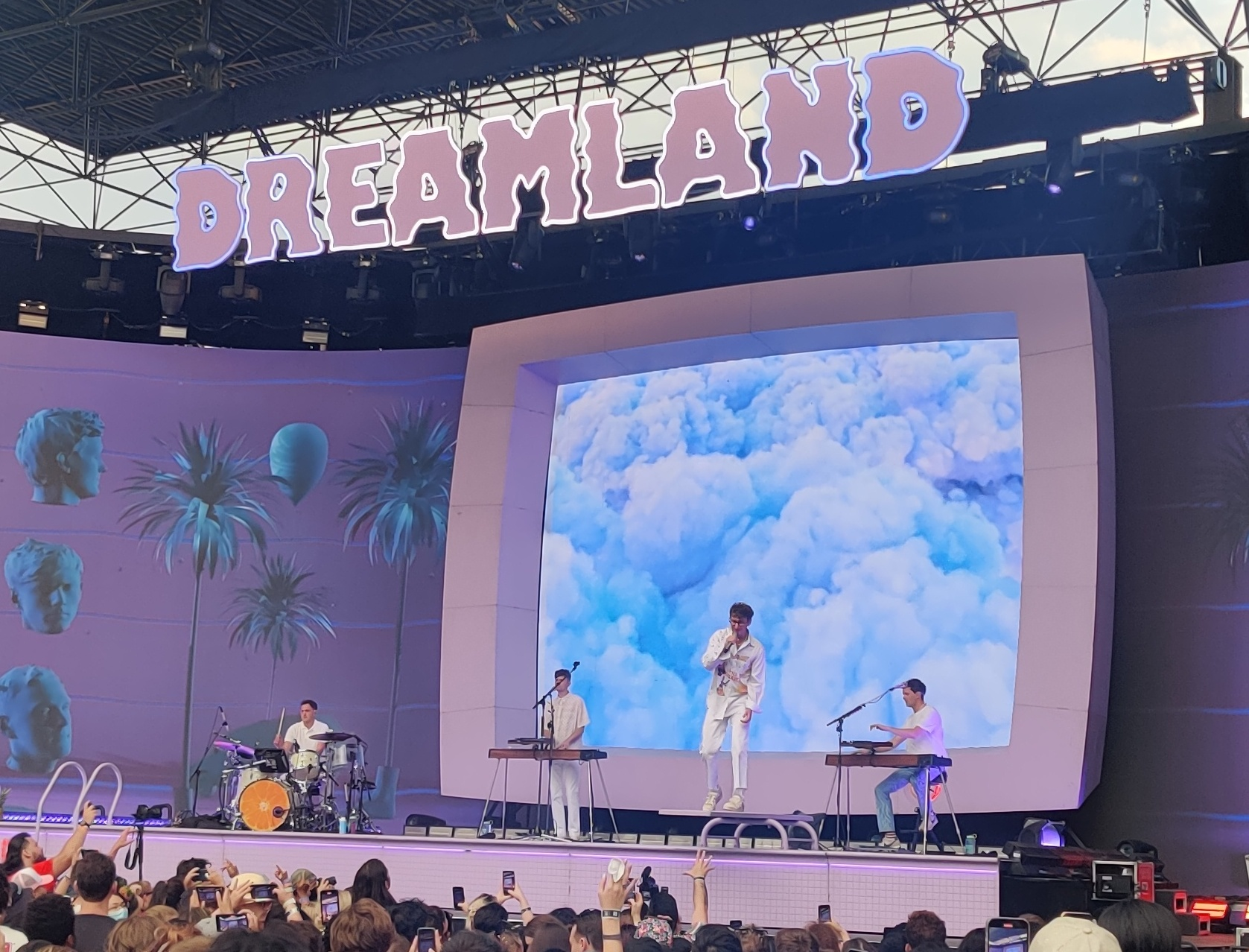
- Glass Animals performing in 2022

Background information
- Origin: Oxford, England
- Genres: Indie rock; psychedelic pop; indie pop; electronic rock; alternative pop
- Years active: 2010–present
- Labels: Wolf Tone; Caroline; Harvest; Polydor; Republic
- Members: Dave Bayley; Drew MacFarlane; Edmund Irwin-Singer; Joe Seaward
- Website: www.glassanimals.com

Glass Animals are an English indie rock band formed in Oxford, England in 2010. The band's line-up consists of Dave Bayley (vocals, guitar, keyboards, drums, songwriting), Drew MacFarlane (guitar, keyboards, backing vocals), Edmund Irwin-Singer (bass, keyboards, backing vocals), and Joe Seaward (drums).

Their first album, Zaba (2014), spawned the hit single "Gooey", which was eventually certified platinum in the U.S. and propelled the band into worldwide recognition. Their second full album, How to Be a Human Being, received positive reviews and won in two categories at the 2018 MPG Awards for UK Album of the Year and Self Producing Artist of the Year, as well as a spot on the Mercury Prize shortlist. The third, Dreamland, peaked at number two on the UK Albums Chart and number seven on the US Billboard 200.

The band is best known for their biggest hit single "Heat Waves", which went viral on TikTok during the COVID-19 pandemic. It reached number one in Australia in February 2021 and was voted number one on the Triple J Hottest 100 of 2020. The song surpassed two billion streams on Spotify by September 2022, and eventually reached number one on the U.S. Billboard Hot 100 and number five on the UK Singles Chart. At the 2022 Brit Awards, the band were nominated for two Brit Awards (Best British Alternative/Rock Act and "Heat Waves" for Best British Single). They received their first Grammy nomination in the Best New Artist category at the 2022 Grammy Awards.

== History ==
=== 2010–2015: Formation, Zaba, and various EPs ===
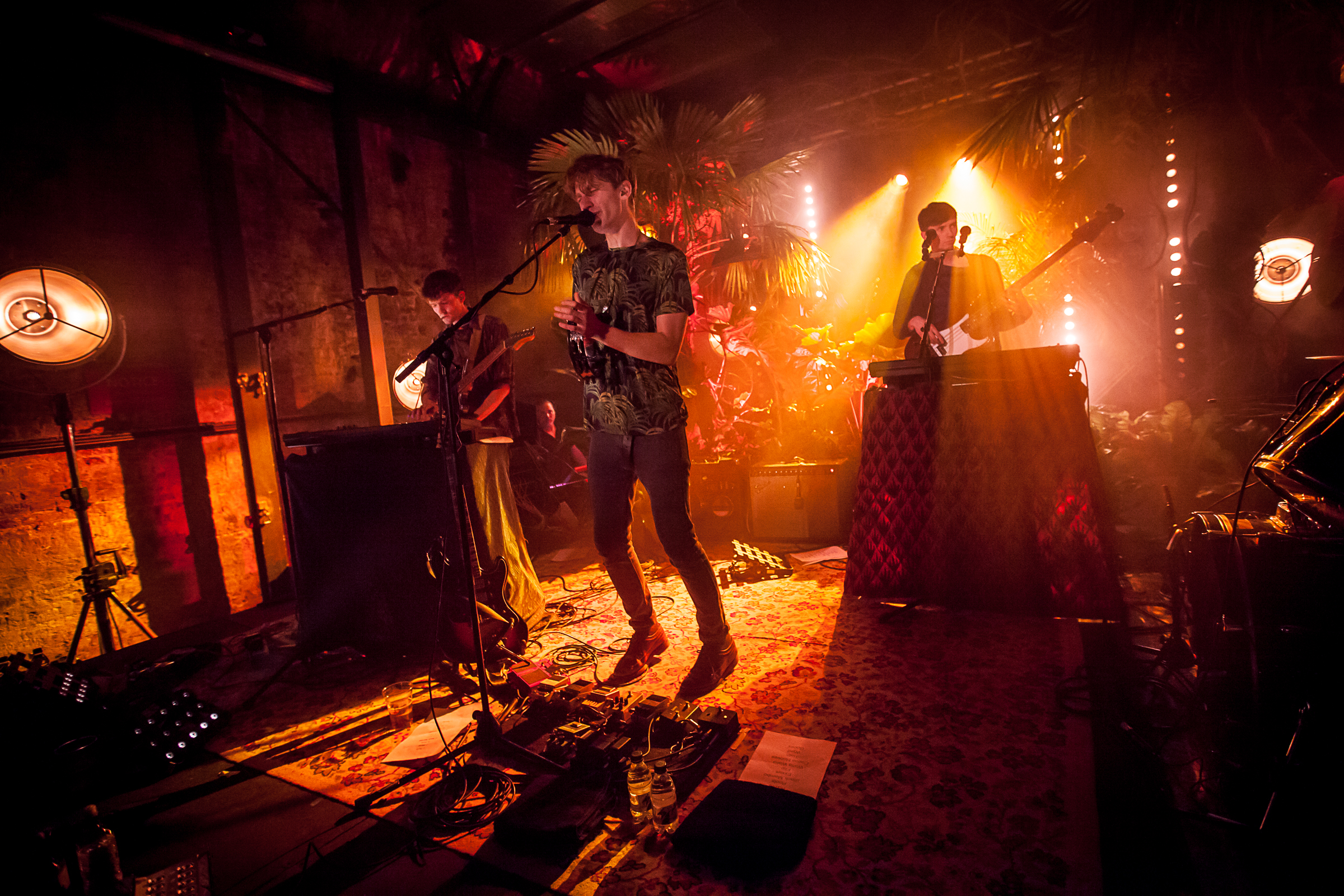
Glass Animals performing in 2014

All four members of the band met at St Edward's School in Oxford. The band's lead singer and songwriter Dave Bayley, who moved to the U.S. at a young age due to his father's job, grew up in Massachusetts and Texas before returning to England at the age of 13. He attended St Edward's on a music scholarship and was introduced to Drew MacFarlane, who would become the band's guitarist and backing vocalist; the two bonded over the fact that they were both Britons who had spent their childhoods in the U.S. MacFarlane then introduced Bayley to Edmund Irwin-Singer, the band's bassist, and Joe Seaward, its drummer. They began playing together as a group in 2010.

On 28 May 2012, the band released their debut EP Leaflings, which included the single "Cocoa Hooves". The EP was released on independent label Kaya Kaya Records, a subsidiary and imprint of XL Recordings (part of the Beggars Group of labels).

In 2013, the band released Black Mambo / Exxus EP in Europe, and Glass Animals EP in the US. The Glass Animals EP also saw the band collaborating with Jean Deaux, a soulful hip-hop teenager from Chicago, on a song titled "Woozy".

In 2014, the band made their first tour of the U.S. and performed at the South by Southwest festival in Austin, Texas. They released three more singles: "Gooey", "Pools", and "Hazey", along with a collaboration, Holiest, with Argentine singer-songwriter and producer Tei Shi.

All five singles were included on the band's debut album, Zaba, which was released on 6 June 2014. The band performed the single "Gooey" on Late Night with Seth Meyers on 9 October 2014 and again on Late Show with David Letterman on 24 February 2015, and toured extensively after Zaba, visiting both hemispheres and playing over 130 shows in 2015 alone. Their October 2015 US tour included two sold-out shows at The Wiltern in LA and sold-out shows across America including T5 in NYC, The Riverside in Milwaukee, and the Midland Theatre in Kansas City.

A collaboration with American rapper Joey Bada$$, titled "Lose Control", was released on 6 October 2015.

=== 2016–2019: How to Be a Human Being ===
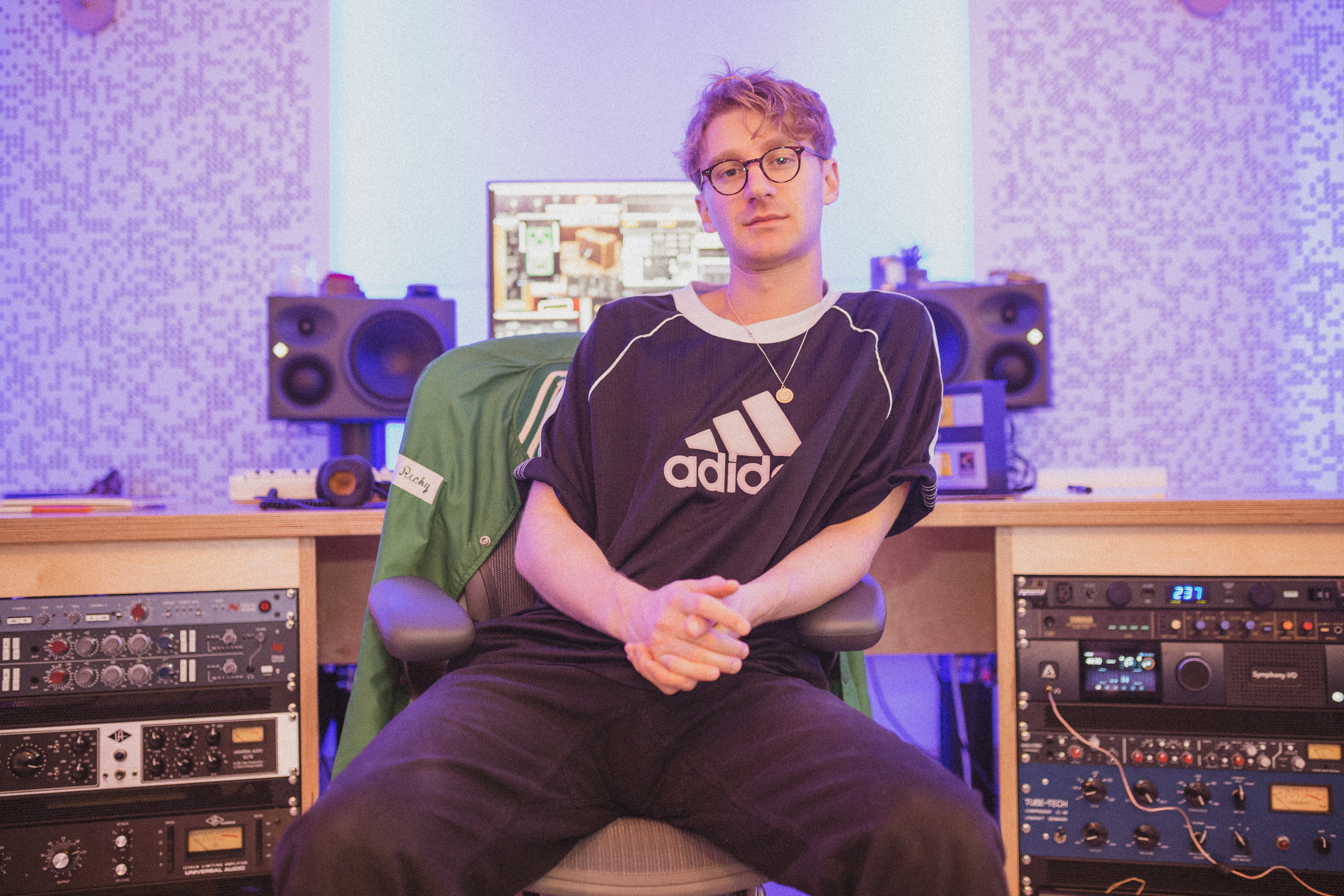
Founder and frontman Dave Bayley in November 2018

On 16 May 2016, the band released the lead single, "Life Itself", from their second album How to Be a Human Being. "Life Itself" peaked at number 14 on Billboard's Alternative Songs chart and spent 26 weeks on Sirius XM's Alt-18 chart, peaking at number one. A music video for the song was released on 7 June 2016. The band also created a website based on the character from "Life Itself".

On 25 July, a second single from the album, "Youth", was released along with its music video. The song was also used as a soundtrack in the popular soccer video game by EA Sports, FIFA 17. Four days before the release of the album, on 22 August, the band released a third single, "Season 2 Episode 3", about a girl who "spends her entire time watching TV, lounging around, not doing anything, being high, eating mayonnaise from a jar".

The full album How to Be a Human Being was released on 26 August 2016 by Wolf Tone and Caroline International in Europe, and Harvest Records in the United States. It was inspired by stories of strangers that Bayley met on tour, with each song telling a different story from a different perspective.

In July 2018, drummer Joe Seaward was seriously injured when he was hit by a lorry while cycling in Dublin. Seaward's accident and recovery resulted in the band cancelling their remaining tour dates for rest of the year.

=== 2019–2024: Dreamland ===
After touring for How to Be a Human Being, the band released two singles; "Tokyo Drifting", a duet with Denzel Curry, on 14 November 2019, and "Your Love (Déjà Vu)" on 19 February 2020. On 1 May 2020, the band released a single named "Dreamland", and announced an album of the same name to be released on 10 July 2020. The beginnings of Dreamland originated after drummer Joe Seaward's bike accident in Dublin. While spending long hours by Seaward's side in the hospital as he recovered, Bayley started "writing down memories and searching for more memories." Those memories eventually evolved into the nostalgic and very personal Dreamland album full of references to Bayley's childhood and other points in his life.

On 28 June, the band announced that the album had been delayed, to "keep focus on the Black Lives Matter movement and the discussions taking place around racism and police brutality around the world." In the lead-up to Dreamland, Glass Animals launched an open-source website where fans could access and download song samples, artwork, and other content related to the album. Dreamland was released on 7 August 2020 via Polydor Records. In an interview with Atwood Magazine, Bayley explained: "I guess the goal with this record was to make something that was incredibly honest and incredibly us." The album entered the UK Albums Chart at number two. "Heat Waves" was included on the FIFA 21 soundtrack.

On 23 January 2021, "Heat Waves" placed first on the Triple J Hottest 100 of 2020 in Australia, with "Tangerine" placing at 18th and "Your Love (Déjà Vu)" at 51st. The following month, "Heat Waves" reached number one on the ARIA Singles Chart. In April 2021, "Tokyo Drifting" was featured in a television commercial released by Peloton as part of their Champions Collection campaign.

A bonus track and single, "I Don’t Wanna Talk (I Just Wanna Dance)", was included on the FIFA 22 soundtrack. After a record-breaking 59-week climb on the US Billboard Hot 100, "Heat Waves" topped the chart for the week ending 12 March 2022.

=== 2024–present: I Love You So F***ing Much ===
In February 2024, posters began to appear in major cities that read "I love you so f***ing much". Around this same time, the Glass Animals website changed from the Dreamland computer to a dark screen with a dolphin next to a search bar where you could ask questions. Next, the account "hal9000000" began posting snippets of the new single on SoundCloud, including "Fake Blood" and "3am". Finally, on 21 March, Glass Animals uploaded a video titled "Incoming" with the same single from the "hal9000000" snippets. On 28 March 2024, the band announced their single "Creatures in Heaven". It was released on 3 April 2024, along with the album title and release date. On 4 April, the "Tour of Earth 2024" was announced, with 42 shows across North America and Europe, with further shows being announced in Australia and New Zealand. In May, Glass Animals began teasing a second song from the album, "A Tear In Space (Airlock)". The intro was first teased at a popup show at Pappy & Harriet’s in Pioneertown CA on April 11, 2024, and played in full during the encore at Liberty Hall, Sydney, on May 9. The song and accompanying music video were released on June 7. I Love You So F***ing Much was released on 19 July 2024, to mixed reviews from critics.

The band released the single "Vampire Bat" on 8 August 2025.

== Musical style ==
Glass Animals' musical style has been described as indie rock, psychedelic pop, indie pop, electronic rock, and alternative pop.

== Band members ==
- Dave Bayley – lead vocals, guitar, keyboards, drums, tambourine, songwriting
- Drew MacFarlane – guitar, keyboards, backing vocals
- Edmund Irwin-Singer – bass guitar, keyboards, backing vocals
- Joe Seaward – drums

== Discography ==
=== Studio albums ===
List of studio albums, with selected chart positions
Title	Details	Peak chart positions										Sales	Certifications
Title	Details	UK	AUS	BEL (FL)	BEL (WA)	CAN	IRL	NLD	NZ	SWI	US	Sales	Certifications
Zaba	Released: 6 June 2014; Label: Wolf Tone, Caroline; Formats: CD, LP, digital download	92	12	—	162	—	—	—	—	—	177	US: 136,000	BPI: Silver; RMNZ: Gold
How to Be a Human Being	Released: 26 August 2016; Label: Wolf Tone, Caroline; Formats: CD, LP, digital download	23	11	68	151	50	20	77	— (Note: How to Be a Human Being did not enter the NZ Top 40 Albums Chart, but peaked at number two on the NZ Heatseekers Singles Chart.)	87	20	US: 12,000	BPI: Gold; ARIA: Gold; RMNZ: Gold
Dreamland	Released: 7 August 2020; Label: Wolf Tone, Polydor; Formats: CD, LP, digital download	2	6	32	106	13	8	15	8	51	7	US: 60,000	BPI: Gold; ARIA: Gold; MC: Platinum; RIAA: Gold; RMNZ: 2× Platinum
I Love You So F***ing Much	Released: 19 July 2024; Label: Polydor; Formats: CD, LP, digital download	5	5	34	90	—	44	20	7	44	11		
"—" denotes an album that did not chart, or was not released in that country.

=== Remix albums ===
List of remix albums
Title	Details
Remixes	Released: 17 February 2015; Label: Wolf Tone; Formats: CD, digital download

=== Extended plays ===
List of extended plays
Title	Details
Leaflings	Released: 28 May 2012; Label: Kaya Kaya; Formats: Digital download
Glass Animals	Released: 2013; Label: Wolf Tone; Formats: Digital download
Pools	Released: 2014; Label: Wolf Tone; Formats: Digital download
Adulthood	Released: 20 November 2020; Label: Wolf Tone; Formats: Digital download
Adolescence	Released: 4 December 2020; Label: Wolf Tone; Formats: Digital download
Childhood	Released: 8 January 2021; Label: Wolf Tone; Formats: Digital download
Heat Waves (Expansion Pack)	Released: 18 March 2021; Label: Wolf Tone; Formats: Digital download

=== Singles ===
List of singles as lead artist, with selected chart positions, showing year released and album name
Title	Year	Peak chart positions										Certifications	Album
Title	Year	UK	AUS	BEL (FL)	CAN	GER	IRL	NZ	SWI	US	WW	Certifications	Album
"Cocoa Hooves"	2012	—	—	—	—	—	—	—	—	—	—		Leaflings EP
"Psylla"	2013	—	—	—	—	—	—	—	—	—	—		Glass Animals EP
"Black Mambo"	2013	—	—	—	—	—	—	—	—	—	—	ARIA: Gold	Zaba
"Pools"	2014	—	—	—	—	—	—	—	—	—	—		Zaba
"Gooey"	2014	— (Note: "Gooey" did not enter the UK Singles Chart, but peaked at number 36 on the UK Physical Singles Chart Top 100.)	40	—	—	—	—	—	—	— (Note: "Gooey" did not enter the Billboard Hot 100, but peaked at number 20 on the Hot Singles Sales chart.)	—	BPI: Silver; ARIA: 3× Platinum; MC: Platinum; RIAA: 2× Platinum	Zaba
"Hazey"	2014	—	—	—	—	—	—	—	—	—	—		Zaba
"Lose Control" (with Joey Bada$$)	2015	—	—	—	—	—	—	—	—	—	—		Non-album single
"Life Itself"	2016	—	—	— (Note: "Life Itself" did not enter the Flanders Ultratop 50, but charted as an "extra tip" on the Ultratip chart.)	—	—	—	—	—	—	—	ARIA: Gold	How to Be a Human Being
"Youth"	2016	—	—	— (Note: "Youth" did not enter the Flanders Ultratop 50, but charted as an "extra tip" on the Ultratip chart.)	—	—	—	—	—	—	—	BPI: Silver; ARIA: Platinum	How to Be a Human Being
"Season 2 Episode 3"	2016	—	—	— (Note: "Season 2 Episode 3" did not enter the Flanders Ultratop 50, but charted as an "extra tip" on the Ultratip chart.)	—	—	—	—	—	—	—	ARIA: Gold	How to Be a Human Being
"Pork Soda"	2017	—	—	—	—	—	—	—	—	—	—	ARIA: Gold	How to Be a Human Being
"Agnes"	2017	—	—	—	—	—	—	—	—	—	—		How to Be a Human Being
"Tokyo Drifting" (with Denzel Curry)	2019	— (Note: "Tokyo Drifting" did not enter the UK Singles Chart, but peaked at number 69 on the UK Singles Sales Chart Top 100.)	—	— (Note: "Tokyo Drifting" did not enter the Flanders Ultratop 50, but charted as an "extra tip" on the Ultratip chart.)	—	—	—	— (Note: "Tokyo Drifting" did not enter the New Zealand Top 40 Singles Chart, but peaked at number 40 on the New Zealand Hot Singles Chart.)	—	—	—	ARIA: Platinum; RIAA: Gold	Dreamland
"Your Love (Déjà Vu)"	2020	—	—	— (Note: "Your Love (Déjà Vu)" did not enter the Flanders Ultratop 50, but charted as an "extra tip" on the Ultratip chart.)	—	—	—	— (Note: "Your Love (Déjà Vu)" did not enter the New Zealand Top 40 Singles Chart, but peaked at number 35 on the New Zealand Hot Singles Chart.)	—	—	—	ARIA: Gold	Dreamland
"Dreamland"	2020	—	—	—	—	—	—	— (Note: "Dreamland" did not enter the New Zealand Top 40 Singles Chart, but peaked at number 28 on the New Zealand Hot Singles Chart.)	—	—	—		Dreamland
"Heat Waves"	2020	5	1	5	1	2	5	2	1	1	1	BPI: 6× Platinum; ARIA: 23× Platinum; BVMI: Diamond; IFPI SWI: 6× Platinum; MC: 8× Platinum; RIAA: Diamond; RMNZ: 7× Platinum	Dreamland
"It's All So Incredibly Loud"	2020	—	—	—	—	—	—	— (Note: "It's All So Incredibly Loud" did not enter the New Zealand Top 40 Singles Chart, but peaked at number 35 on the New Zealand Hot Singles Chart.)	—	—	—		Dreamland
"Tangerine" (featuring Arlo Parks) (Note: The chart numbers refer to both the solo version of the song and the non-album version featuring Arlo Parks, however only the latter was released as a single.)	2020	—	—	—	—	—	—	— (Note: "Tangerine" did not enter the New Zealand Top 40 Singles Chart, but peaked at number 13 on the New Zealand Hot Singles Chart.)	—	—	—	ARIA: Gold	Dreamland
"Space Ghost Coast to Coast" (with Bree Runway) (Note: The chart numbers refer to both the solo version of the song and the non-album version featuring Bree Runway, however only the latter was released as a single.)	2021	—	—	—	—	—	—	— (Note: "Space Ghost Coast to Coast" did not enter the New Zealand Top 40 Singles Chart, but peaked at number 25 on the New Zealand Hot Singles Chart.)	—	—	—		Dreamland
"I Don't Wanna Talk (I Just Wanna Dance)"	2021	— (Note: "I Don't Wanna Talk (I Just Wanna Dance)" did not enter the UK Singles Chart, but peaked at number 58 on the UK Singles Sales Chart Top 100.)	—	—	—	—	92	— (Note: "I Don't Wanna Talk (I Just Wanna Dance)" did not enter the New Zealand Top 40 Singles Chart, but peaked at number 22 on the New Zealand Hot Singles Chart.)	—	—	—	ARIA: Gold	Dreamland (+ Bonus Levels 2.0)
"Creatures in Heaven"	2024	— (Note: "Creatures in Heaven" did not enter the UK Singles Chart, but peaked at number 39 on the UK Singles Sales Chart Top 100.)	—	—	—	—	—	—	—	—	—		I Love You So F***ing Much
"A Tear in Space (Airlock)"	2024	— (Note: "A Tear in Space (Airlock)" did not enter the UK Singles Chart, but peaked at number 19 on the UK Physical Singles Chart Top 100.)	—	—	—	—	—	— (Note: "A Tear in Space (Airlock)" did not enter the NZ Top 40 Singles Chart, but peaked at number 23 on the NZ Hot Singles Chart.)	—	—	—		I Love You So F***ing Much
"Show Pony"	2024	—	—	—	—	—	—	— (Note: "Show Pony" did not enter the NZ Top 40 Singles Chart, but peaked at number 22 on the NZ Hot Singles Chart.)	—	—	—		I Love You So F***ing Much
"Wonderful Nothing"	2024	—	—	—	—	—	—	— (Note: "Wonderful Nothing" did not enter the NZ Top 40 Singles Chart, but peaked at number 39 on the NZ Hot Singles Chart.)	—	—	—		I Love You So F***ing Much
"Vampire Bat"	2025	—	—	—	—	—	—	— (Note: "Vampire Bat" did not enter the NZ Top 40 Singles Chart, but peaked at number 27 on the NZ Hot Singles Chart.)	—	—	—		Non-album single
"—" denotes a recording that did not chart or was not released in that territory.

=== Promotional singles ===
List of promotional singles as lead artist showing year released and album name
Title	Year	Album
"Heart-Shaped Box (Quarantine Covers Ep. 1)"	2020	Non-album promotional singles
"Young and Beautiful (Quarantine Covers Ep. 2)"	2020	Non-album promotional singles

=== Other charted and certified songs ===
List of non-single chart appearances
Title	Year	Peak chart positions					Certifications	Album
Title	Year	BLR Air.	EST Air.	NZ Hot	UKR	US Rock	Certifications	Album
"The Other Side of Paradise"	2016	—	—	—	—	45	ARIA: Platinum	How to Be a Human Being
"Take a Slice"	2016	—	—	—	—	—	BPI: Silver; ARIA: Gold	How to Be a Human Being
"Hot Sugar"	2020	—	—	28	—	41		Dreamland
"Waterfalls Coming Out Your Mouth"	2020	—	—	—	—	45		Dreamland
"Heatwaves" (Diplo remix)	2020	181	174	—	175	—		"Heatwaves" single
"—" denotes a recording that did not chart or was not released in that territory.

== Awards and nominations ==
Year	Association	Category	Nominated work	Result	Ref.
2017	Mercury Prize	Album of the Year	How to Be a Human Being	Nominated	
2018	MPG	UK Album of the Year	How to Be a Human Being	Won	
2018	MPG	Self Producing Artist of the Year	Dave Bayley (Glass Animals)	Won	
2021	Variety	Group of the Year	Glass Animals	Won	
2021	Video Music Awards	Best Alternative	"Heat Waves"	Nominated	
2022	Billboard Music Awards	Top Duo/Group	Glass Animals	Nominated	
2022	Billboard Music Awards	Top Rock Artist	Glass Animals	Won	
2022	Billboard Music Awards	Top Streaming Song	"Heat Waves"	Nominated	
2022	Billboard Music Awards	Top Viral Song	"Heat Waves"	Nominated	
2022	Brit Awards	Best British Single	"Heat Waves"	Nominated	
2022	Brit Awards	Best British Rock/Alternative Act	Glass Animals	Nominated	
2022	Grammy Awards	Best New Artist	Glass Animals	Nominated	
2022	Kids' Choice Awards	Favorite Breakout Artist	Glass Animals	Nominated	
2022	iHeartRadio Titanium Award	1 Billion Total Audience Spins on iHeartRadio Stations	"Heat Waves"	Won	
2023	iHeartRadio Music Awards	Song of the Year	"Heat Waves"	Nominated	
2023	iHeartRadio Music Awards	Alternative Song of the Year	"Heat Waves"	Nominated	
2023	iHeartRadio Music Awards	Best Duo/Group of the Year	Glass Animals	Nominated	
2025	Berlin Music Video Awards	Best Concept	"Show Pony"	Nominated	
2026	Clio Awards	Use of Artists, Talent & Influencers	Roblox Experience	Bronze	
