= Hello Broadway =

Studio album by Marvin Gaye
- Released: November 12, 1964
- Recorded: 1964
- Studio: Graystone Ballroom, Detroit, MI
- Genre: Traditional Pop
- Length: 32:22
- Label: Tamla; TS 259
- Producer: Hal Davis, Marc Gordon

Marvin Gaye chronology
Together (1964)	Hello Broadway (1964)	How Sweet It Is to Be Loved by You (1965)

Professional ratings
Review scores
Source	Rating
Record Mirror	3/5 stars

Hello Broadway is the fourth studio album by soul singer Marvin Gaye, released in 1964. It is an album of standards and Broadway material.

Released during the middle of Gaye's coming-of-age as Motown's premier male solo star, the album showcases more of Gaye's personal desire to be a Nat King Cole/Frank Sinatra styled crooner rather than the R&B hitmaker Motown was grooming him into. Hello Broadway and Gaye's When I'm Alone I Cry albums were released at a time when Motown executives wanted Gaye to record for strictly the young R&B crowds rather than capture a more mature audience. It would take Gaye years to craft an album of standards that were more of his making, rather than the Cole-styled vocals he laid during this earlier period.

== Track listing ==
Side one

1. "Hello Broadway" (Ronald Miller, William O'Malley) – 3:11
2. "People" (Bob Merrill, Jule Styne) – 3:03
3. "The Party's Over" (Betty Comden, Adolph Green, Jule Styne) – 3:02
4. "On the Street Where You Live" (Frederick Loewe, Alan Jay Lerner) – 2:24
5. "What Kind of Fool Am I?" (Leslie Bricusse, Anthony Newley) – 3:40
6. "My Kind of Town" (Sammy Cahn, Jimmy Van Heusen) – 2:36

Side two

1. "Days of Wine and Roses" (Henry Mancini, Johnny Mercer) – 3:36
2. "This Is the Life" (Charles Strouse, Lee Adams) – 2:36
3. "My Way" (Richard Jacques, Ronald Miller) – 2:53
4. "Hello Dolly!" (Jerry Herman) – 2:53
5. "Walk on the Wild Side" (Mack David, Elmer Bernstein) – 2:18

== Personnel ==
- Marvin Gaye – vocals
- Gene Page – arranger
- Jerry Long – arranger (on ‘Walk On the Wild Side)

== See also ==
- List of 1964 albums
- On Broadway, a similar recording by fellow Motown act Four Tops
