= Try It Baby =

Single by Marvin Gaye

from the album How Sweet It Is to Be Loved by You
- B-side: "If My Heart Could Sing"
- Released: May 21, 1964
- Recorded: January 28 & 29, 1964
- Genre: R&B
- Length: 2:30
- Label: Tamla
- Songwriter(s): Berry Gordy, Jr.
- Producer(s): Berry Gordy, Jr.

Marvin Gaye singles chronology
"What's the Matter With You Baby" (1964)	"Try It Baby" (1964)	"Baby Don't You Do It" (1964)

"Try It Baby" is a slow blues ballad recorded by American soul singer Marvin Gaye, released on the Tamla label in 1964. The ballad was written and produced by Gaye's brother-in-law, Motown chairman Berry Gordy.

== Background ==
The ballad talked of a woman who was "moving up" and "leaving (her man) behind". To help him along the way, the Temptations (fresh off scoring their first few hits) assisted Gaye in the track providing background vocals.

Cash Box described it as "a tantalizing, chorus-backed rhythm shuffler that Marvin does up in winning style."

== Chart history ==
"Try It Baby" reached number 15 on the pop singles chart and number six on the R&B singles chart.

Chart (1964)	Peak position
U.S. Billboard Hot 100	15

== Cover versions ==
- "Try It Baby" was covered in 1968 as a joint effort by Diana Ross & the Supremes and the Temptations. Featuring Melvin Franklin, Diana Ross, and Paul Williams on leads, the track was included on the 1968 LP Diana Ross & the Supremes Join the Temptations, their first of four joint albums.

== Personnel ==
Marvin Gaye version

- Lead vocals by Marvin Gaye
- Background vocals by the Temptations: Paul Williams, Eddie Kendricks, David Ruffin, Melvin Franklin and Otis Williams
- Trumpet solo by Maurice Davis
- Instrumentation by the Funk Brothers

Supremes/Temptations version

- Lead vocals by Diana Ross, Paul Williams and Melvin Franklin
- Background Vocals by Otis Williams, Melvin Franklin, Eddie Kendricks, Paul Williams, Dennis Edwards, and the Andantes
- Instrumentation by Los Angeles session musicians
