= Gooey (song) =

2014 single by Glass Animals

Single by Glass Animals

from the album Zaba
- Released: 14 February 2014
- Genre: R&B; neo-psychedelia
- Length: 4:49
- Label: Wolf Tone
- Songwriter: Dave Bayley
- Producers: Dave Bayley; Paul Epworth

Glass Animals singles chronology
| "Pools" (2014) | "Gooey" (2014) | "Hazey" (2014) |

Music video
- "Gooey" on YouTube

"Gooey" is a song by British experimental rock band Glass Animals, released on 14 February 2014 as the lead single from their debut studio album Zaba (2014).

The song received positive reviews from critics, and ranked at number 12 on the Triple J's Hottest 100 of 2014, the band's highest placing until 2020, when "Heat Waves" topped the poll.

== Composition ==
Dave Bayley laid down his vocals holding a pineapple named "Sasha Fierce", and recorded the final chorus in eight different impressions, including "an old woman, a drunk crack addict, [and] a terrible impression of James Brown" to replicate the sound of a choir.

== Live performances ==
Glass Animals performed "Gooey" on Late Night with Seth Meyers in 2014, and again on The Late Show with David Letterman on 24 February 2015.

== In popular culture ==
"Gooey" was featured on the soundtrack for the film Magic Mike XXL.

== Charts ==
=== Weekly charts ===
Weekly chart performance for "Gooey"
| Chart (2014–2015) | Peak position |
|---|---|
| Australia (ARIA) | 40 |
| Mexico Ingles Airplay (Billboard) | 25 |
| UK Physical Singles (OCC) | 36 |
| US Billboard Hot Singles Sales | 20 |
| US Hot Rock & Alternative Songs (Billboard) | 26 |
| US Rock & Alternative Airplay (Billboard) | 31 |

=== Year-end charts ===
Year-end chart performance for "Gooey"
| Chart (2015) | Position |
|---|---|
| US Hot Rock Songs (Billboard) | 88 |

== Certifications ==
Certifications for "Gooey"
| Region | Certification | Certified units/sales |
|---|---|---|
| Australia (ARIA) | 3× Platinum | 210,000^{‡} |
| Canada (Music Canada) | Platinum | 80,000^{‡} |
| United Kingdom (BPI) | Silver | 200,000^{‡} |
| United States (RIAA) | 2× Platinum | 2,000,000^{‡} |
^{‡} Sales+streaming figures based on certification alone.
