= Dave Hamilton (musician) =

Musical artist (1920–1994)

- Born: David Lewis Hamilton; January 15, 1920; Savannah, Georgia, U.S.
- Origin: Detroit, Michigan, U.S.
- Died: August 8, 1994 (aged 74) Detroit, Michigan, U.S.
- Genres: R&B, jazz, funk
- Occupations: Musician, record producer, recording studio owner
- Instruments: Guitar, vibes
- Years active: 1930s–1990s
- Labels: Sensation, Motown, Tempo, Topper

David Lewis Hamilton (January 15, 1920 – August 9, 1994) was an American R&B and jazz musician and record producer in Detroit, Michigan.

== Life and career ==
Dave Hamilton was born in Savannah, Georgia, and moved to Detroit with his parents as a child. He played guitar and vibraphone, and in the late 1930s toured as a member of the Helen Pennilton Quartet. In the 1940s he formed his own band, the Noc-Tunes, who recorded for the Sensation label. Hamilton remained active as a performer and session musician on the Detroit music scene, and from 1954 recorded several singles with a vocal group, the Peppers, released on the Checker label. He came to know Berry Gordy, and played on Jackie Wilson's hits "Reet Petite" (1957) and "Lonely Teardrops" (1958), which Gordy co-wrote and in the latter case produced.

In the early 1960s Hamilton played on such recordings as John Lee Hooker's "Boom Boom" (1961), as well as many recordings for Gordy's Motown label and associated labels. He was an early member of the loose aggregation of studio musicians at Motown who later became known as "The Funk Brothers". He played guitar on Marvin Gaye's "Stubborn Kind of Fellow" (1962), and vibes on Mary Wells' 1964 hit "My Guy". As a songwriter, Hamilton co-wrote "Once Upon a Time", released as a duet by Gaye and Wells. In 1963 he released under his own name a jazz album, Blue Vibrations, on the Workshop Jazz label set up as a subsidiary of Motown. The record was produced by Clarence Paul, who also co-composed some of the tracks with Hamilton.

After leaving Motown, Hamilton continued to release occasional singles credited to Dave Hamilton and the Peppers, including "Beatle Walk" (1964). He set up his own record labels, Tempo and Topper, and in 1965 established the Da Da recording studio with singer and songwriter Darrell Goolsby (who recorded as Rony Darrell). Releases on the Topper label included singles by Tobi Lark (a.k.a. Tobi Legend), Little Ann (Bridgeforth) and Priscilla Page. As label owner, producer and studio musician, Hamilton recorded a wide variety of material during the 1960s and 1970s, much of which was unreleased at the time, including gospel and funk recordings. He also started further record labels, including TCB and Demoristic.

From the 1980s, British collectors and fans of the music that had become known as "Northern soul" became aware of Hamilton's recordings, and they started to be reissued in the UK on CD by Kent and Ace Records. After Hamilton's death in 1994, aged 74, researcher Ady Croasdell gained access to Hamilton's archives, and as a result compiled several CDs of recordings made by Hamilton, including three volumes of Dave Hamilton's Detroit Dancers, and Dave Hamilton's Detroit Funk which included recordings originally intended for an instrumental album, Soul Suite.
