= How Sweet It Is to Be Loved by You =

Studio album by Marvin Gaye
- Released: January 21, 1965
- Studio: Hitsville USA (Detroit, Michigan)
- Genre: Soul; R&B
- Length: 33:24
- Label: Tamla (TS-258)
- Producer: Brian Holland; Lamont Dozier; Berry Gordy; William "Mickey" Stevenson

Marvin Gaye chronology
| Hello Broadway (1964) | How Sweet It Is to Be Loved by You (1965) | A Tribute to the Great Nat King Cole (1965) |

Singles from How Sweet It Is to Be Loved By You
- 1. "You're a Wonderful One" Released: February 20, 1964; 2. "Try It Baby" Released: May 21, 1964; 3. "Baby Don't You Do It" Released: September 2, 1964; 4. "How Sweet It Is (To Be Loved by You)" Released: November 4, 1964

How Sweet It Is to Be Loved by You is the fifth studio album released by the American singer-songwriter Marvin Gaye, released on January 21, 1965.

== Background ==
The album features the successful title track, which at the time was his best-selling single and was covered by James Taylor in 1975. Other hits include "Try It Baby" (which features the Temptations) and "Baby Don't You Do It" (with backing vocals provided by the Andantes).

== Chart performance ==
The album was Gaye's second album to reach the Billboard 200, peaking at number 128 for the week of April 3, 1965, eventually staying on the chart for ten weeks. It was Gaye's first R&B charting album, peaking more successfully at number four for the week of March 6, 1965, spending a total of seven weeks.

== Track listing ==
Side one

1. "You're a Wonderful One" (Holland-Dozier-Holland) – 2:45
2. "How Sweet It Is (to Be Loved by You)" (Holland-Dozier-Holland) – 2:58
3. "Try It Baby" (Berry Gordy, Jr.) – 2:51
4. "Baby Don't You Do It" (Holland-Dozier-Holland) – 2:38
5. "Need Your Lovin' (Want You Back)" (Marvin Gaye, Clarence Paul) – 2:15
6. "One of These Days" (William "Mickey" Stevenson) – 3:00

Side two

1. "No Good Without You" (William "Mickey" Stevenson) – 2:43
2. "Stepping Closer to Your Heart" (Marvin Gaye, Harvey Fuqua) – 2:43
3. "Need Somebody" (Ivy Hunter, William "Mickey" Stevenson) – 2:51
4. "Me and My Lonely Room" (Barrett Strong, Norman Whitfield) – 2:52
5. "Now That You've Won Me" (Smokey Robinson) – 2:40
6. "Forever" (Lamont Dozier, Brian Holland, Freddie Gorman) – 2:20

== Personnel ==
- Marvin Gaye – lead vocals
- The Andantes – backing vocals (side 1, tracks 2, 4, and 6; side 2, track 4)
- The Spinners – backing vocals (side 1, track 5; side 2, tracks 1–4)
- The Supremes – backing vocals (side 1, track 1)
- The Temptations – backing vocals (side 1, track 3)
- The Love-Tones – backing vocals (side 1, track 6)
- Martha and the Vandellas – backing vocals (side 2, track 5)
- The Funk Brothers – instrumentation
  - Maurice Davis – trumpet solo (side 1, track 3)
  - Marcus Belgrave – trumpet (side 1, track 1)
  - Russell Conway – trumpet (side 1, track 1)
  - Paul Riser – trombone (side 1, track 1)
  - Patrick Lanier – trombone (side 1, track 1)
  - Henry Cosby – tenor saxophone (side 1, track 1)
  - Mike Terry – baritone saxophone (side 1, tracks 1, 2 and 4)
  - George Fowler – organ (side 1, tracks 1 and 2)
  - Johnny Griffith – piano (side 1, track 1)
  - Earl Van Dyke – piano (side 1, track 2)
  - Clarence Isabell – bass (side 1, track 1)
  - James Jamerson – bass (side 1, track 2)
  - Benny Benjamin – drums (side 1, track 1)
  - Richard "Pistol" Allen – drums (side 1, track 2)
  - Eddie Willis – guitar (side 1, track 1)
  - Robert White – guitar (side 1, track 2)
  - Jack Ashford – tambourine (side 1, tracks 1 and 2)

== Weekly charts ==
| Chart (1965) | Peak position |
|---|---|
| U.S. Billboard Top Pop Albums | 128 |
| U.S. Billboard Top R&B Albums | 4 |
