= Together (Marvin Gaye and Mary Wells album) =

Studio album by Marvin Gaye and Mary Wells
- Released: April 15, 1964
- Recorded: February – April 1963
- Studios: Hitsville U.S.A. (Detroit, Michigan)
- Genre: Soul
- Length: 28.25
- Label: Motown
- Producers: William "Mickey" Stevenson; Clarence Paul on "Once Upon a Time"

Marvin Gaye chronology
Greatest Hits (1964)	Together (1964)	Hello Broadway (1964)

Mary Wells chronology
Greatest Hits (1964)	Together (1964)	Mary Wells Sings My Guy (1964)

Singles from Together
- 1. "Once Upon a Time" / "What's the Matter with You Baby" Released: April 14, 1964

Professional ratings
Review scores
Source	Rating
AllMusic	2.5/5 stars
Record Mirror	3/5 stars

Together is the only studio album released by the duo team of American Motown artists Marvin Gaye and Mary Wells. It was released on the Motown label on April 15, 1964. The album brought Gaye together with Wells, an established star with a number-one pop hit to her name (1964's "My Guy"), singing mostly standards and show tunes, in the hopes that Gaye would benefit from the exposure.

This album became the first charted album credited to Gaye, peaking at number 42 on the Billboard Pop Albums chart and yielding two top 20 singles, "Once Upon a Time" and "What's the Matter with You Baby". Shortly afterwards, upon reaching twenty-one, Wells, who received bad advice from her former husband and manager, left Motown. The label had to find another duet partner for Gaye, enlisting Kim Weston for one album, Take Two, also consisting of similar material, but later yielding a longer-lasting pairing of Gaye with Tammi Terrell, with more contemporary material.

== Track listing ==
No.	Title	Writer(s)	Length
1.	"Once Upon a Time"	Barney Ales, Dave Hamilton, Clarence Paul, William "Mickey" Stevenson	2:32
2.	"'Deed I Do"	Walter Hirsch, Fred Rose	3.00
3.	"Until I Met You"	Freddie Green, Donald Wolf	3:26
4.	"Together"	Buddy G. DeSylva, Lew Brown, Ray Henderson	2:49
5.	"(I Love You) For Sentimental Reasons"	William Best, Deek Watson	2:35
6.	"The Late, Late Show"	Roy Alfred, Murray Berlin	2:42
7.	"After the Lights Go Down Low"	Phil Belmonte, Leroy Lovett, Allen White	2:53
8.	"Just Squeeze Me (Don't Tease Me)"	Duke Ellington, Lee Gaines	2:32
9.	"What's the Matter with You Baby"	Barney Ales, Clarence Paul, William "Mickey" Stevenson	2:24
10.	"You Came a Long Way from St. Louis"	John Brooks, Bob Russell	2:52

== Personnel ==
- Marvin Gaye – lead vocals
- Mary Wells – lead and additional vocals
- The Love Tones – background vocals
- The Andantes – background vocals
- The Funk Brothers – instrumentation
