= Once Upon a Time (Marvin Gaye and Mary Wells song) =

Single by Marvin Gaye and Mary Wells

from the album Together
- B-side: "What's the Matter with You Baby"
- Released: 1964
- Genre: Pop; rhythm and blues
- Length: 2:32
- Label: Motown
- Songwriters: Clarence Paul; Barney Ales; Dave Hamilton; William "Mickey" Stevenson
- Producer: Mickey Stevenson

Marvin Gaye singles chronology
| "You're a Wonderful One" (1964) | "Once Upon a Time" (1964) | "What's the Matter with You Baby" (1964) |

Mary Wells singles chronology
| "My Guy" (1964) | "Once Upon a Time" (1964) | "What's the Matter with You Baby" (1964) |

"Once Upon a Time" is a 1964 single released by Marvin Gaye and Mary Wells from their sole duet album, Together. "Once Upon a Time' was written by Clarence Paul, Barney Ales, Dave Hamilton and William "Mickey" Stevenson. The song's co-writer, Dave Hamilton, also plays the vibraharp solo on the record.

== Background ==
The song discussed how the two narrators felt lonely until they met each other referring to their past as it happened "once upon a time".

Cash Box described it as "a most attractive shuffle-beat cha cha romancer" and an "excellent instrumental showcase."

The duo of Gaye and Wells would never be able to promote the record as Wells had already left the label at the time of its release. Gaye himself wouldn't perform it until his final concert tour, the Sexual Healing Tour, in 1983, rearranging it as a slow quiet storm ballad to the delight of his fans.

== Personnel ==
- All vocals by Marvin Gaye and Mary Wells
- Produced by William "Mickey" Stevenson
- Instrumentation by The Funk Brothers

== Chart history ==
"Once Upon a Time" brought simultaneous top forty pop success for the duo as the single hit number nineteen while its B-side, "What's the Matter with You Baby" peaked at number seventeen on the pop singles chart.

| Chart (1964) | Peak position |
|---|---|
| UK Singles Chart | 50 |
| US Billboard Hot 100 | 19 |
