= On Broadway (Four Tops album) =

Studio album by Four Tops
- Released: March 1, 1967
- Studio: Los Angeles
- Genre: Broadway show tunes; soul
- Length: 35:24
- Language: English
- Label: Motown
- Producer: Frank Wilson

Four Tops chronology
Four Tops Live! (1966)	On Broadway (1967)	Reach Out (1967)

On Broadway is the fourth studio album by American soul vocal group Four Tops, mostly covering Broadway show tunes and musical numbers.

== Recording and release ==
Motown founder Berry Gordy had the idea for this album, encouraging his stable of artists to turn toward new audiences for their music, particularly higher class listeners. The band recorded On Broadway with musician Frank Wilson in Los Angeles, with the exception of their covers of "Make Someone Happy" (recorded in 1964) and "Nice 'n' Easy" (recorded in 1963).

== Reception ==
A brief review in Billboard suggests to retailers that this album will be a "sure-fire hit LP" with "smooth performances". Editors at AllMusic Guide scored this album 2.5 out of five stars, with critic Andrew Hamilton considering this album a failed experiment that Motown should have stopped, but calling the cover of "Make Someone Happy" "an endearing rendition". While many reviewers consider this a failed experiment, a 1995 review of pop stars covering musical show tunes notes that this was an innovative release.

== Track listing ==
1. "Hello Broadway" (Ronald Miller and William O'Malley) – 3:50
2. "Maria" (Leonard Bernstein and Stephen Sondheim) – 2:50
3. "Climb Ev'ry Mountain" (lyrics: Oscar Hammerstein II, music: Richard Rodgers) – 2:50
4. "Mame" (Jerry Herman) – 2:38
5. "I Want to Be with You" (Lee Adams and Charles Strouse) – 2:34
6. "On the Street Where You Live" (lyrics: Alan Jay Lerner, music: Frederick Loewe) – 2:54
7. "The Sound of Music" (lyrics: Hammerstein, music: Rodgers) – 2:58
8. "What Did I Have That I Don't Have" (Lerner and Burton Lane) – 2:16
9. "For Once in My Life" (Miller and Orlando Murden) – 2:45
10. "My Way" (Miller and Richard Jacques) – 2:26
11. "Make Someone Happy" (lyrics: Betty Comden and Adolph Green, music: Jule Styne) – 4:26
12. "Nice 'n' Easy" (Alan Bergman, Marilyn Keith, and Lew Spence) – 2:57

== Personnel ==
Four Tops

- Renaldo Benson – bass vocals
- Abdul Fakir – first tenor vocals
- Lawrence Payton – keyboards, second tenor vocals, vocal arrangement
- Levi Stubbs – baritone lead and baritone vocals

Additional personnel

- Frank Dandridge – photography
- Jule Styne – liner notes
- H. Webber – design
- Frank Wilson – production

== Chart performance ==
Although initial sales of this album were strong, On Broadway was not as successful as previous Four Tops albums, reaching 79 on the Billboard 200 and fifteenth on the Billboard Top R&B/Hip Hop Albums chart.

== See also ==
- Hello Broadway, a 1964 album by fellow Motown artist Marvin Gaye covering Broadway tunes
- List of 1967 albums
