= The Demensions =

Bronx NY-based doo wop group

The Demensions are an American doo wop group from The Bronx, New York. They attended Christopher Columbus High School. Over the years, there have been a number of lineup changes. The group that sang on most of their earlier recordings includes Lenny Dell, Phil Del Giudice, Howie Margolin, and Marisa Martelli.

At the height of their popularity in the early 1960s, The Demensions played often in Palisades Park, New Jersey, as well as on American Bandstand and The Clay Cole Show. They also appeared at the Braniff Space Rover, known as the "Space Ship," at Freedomland U.S.A. in The Bronx. They first scored radio airplay as a result of Cousin Brucie, a disc jockey at New York radio station WINS, who began spinning their version of "Over the Rainbow". The song became a hit, peaking at No. 16 on the Billboard Hot 100 in 1960 and No. 17 in Canada. Their only other chart hit was 1962's "My Foolish Heart", which peaked at No. 95 early in 1963.

In 1992, The Demensions (with an altered lineup) recorded again for the first time since 1963, releasing Beyond the Rainbow.

Original lead singer Lenny Dell died in 2021.

== Members ==
Note: This list is incomplete

- Lenny Dell (Original lead)

Present members:

- Tom Clemente
- Robin Robbert
- Vinny Pizzo
- Charlie Marrone (Guitar / background)
- Dennis Cirolia (Drums)
- Michael Banek (Bass guitar)

Previous members:

- John Martinucci
- Ron Scauri
- Patti McTernan
- Richard Carnese (Guitar)
- Peter Soonarie (Bass guitar)
- Dominick V. Cassano (Drums)
- Uncle Phil Del Giudice (deceased)
- Marisa Martelli
- Howie Margolin
- Charlie Peterson
- Joel Reinlieb
- Patrick Gamberdella (Bass guitar)
