= Little Ann (singer) =

American singer-songwriter

- Also known as: A. Bridgeforth, Ann Bridgeforth, Ann Bridgeworth, Little Anne
- Born: Ann Bridgeforth; March 22, 1945; Chicago, US
- Died: January 26, 2003 (aged 57) Michigan, US
- Genres: Soul, Northern soul
- Occupations: Singer, songwriter
- Instrument: Vocals
- Years active: c1960-69, 2003
- Labels: Ric-Tic, Kent Records, Deep Soul

Little Ann (born Ann Bridgeforth; 22 March 1945 – 26 January 2003) was an American soul singer. Her recording career was short-lived but her work was 'rediscovered' shortly before her death.

== Life and career ==
Originally from Chicago, but growing up in the small town of Mount Clemens in Michigan, "Little Ann" Bridgeforth performed regularly as a singer, including at her cousin's club, Michelle's Playroom. When she was getting gigs elsewhere, she changed her name to Little Ann - how she was known within the family, as the youngest of seven brothers and sisters.

In 1967 in Detroit, she recorded "Deep Shadows", produced by Dave Hamilton, but it was not released, and was almost lost to history. In 1969, she recorded an album's worth of her soulful singing, with Hamilton. The record company, Ric-Tic, released only one song, "Going Down a One Way Street", as a single (Ric-Tic142). It was to be her only release for a long time. (One of the executives of the company was Joanne Bratton-Jackson, with whom Little Ann is sometimes, erroneously, identified.)

In the early 1980s, an acetate of a Little Ann song was discovered by someone in England. Under the title "When He's Not Around" by Rose Valentine, it became a big hit in the Northern soul scene.

Then in 1990, that original master tape, including the song, which was really called "What Should I Do?", was discovered at Hamilton's home, leading to a release of the single on Ace/Kent Records.

"Deep Shadows" was finally heard by the world on the CD compilation Dave Hamilton's Detroit Dancers, Vol 1 in 1998, along with two other, at-that-time unreleased, tracks. It has since been covered several times and has featured in a Nike Jordan trainers ad in the US. Further unreleased tracks appeared on Detroit Dancers Volumes 2 and 3, in 1999 and 2006 respectively, before the tracks were compiled on vinyl in 2009 with the release of the entire Deep Shadows album on Helsinki's Timmion Records.

Finally, with the release of some of her music, Little Ann performed in the UK shortly before her death in 2003.

Little Ann (Bridgeforth) is not to be confused with Little Ann (Sandford) who recorded with Tarheel Slim between 1959 and 1965.

== Discography ==
- "Going Down a One-Way Street (The Wrong Way)"/"I'd Like to Know You Better" 7" (1968)
- Deep Shadows LP (2009)
- Detroit's Secret Soul: Little Ann (2020)
