= Zaba (album) =

Studio album by Glass Animals
- Released: 9 June 2014
- Studios: Wolf Tone Studios (London, United Kingdom)
- Genres: Psychedelic pop; indie rock; indie pop
- Length: 45:31
- Labels: Wolf Tone, Caroline
- Producers: Dave Bayley, Paul Epworth (exec.)

Glass Animals chronology
Glass Animals (2013)	Zaba (2014)	How to Be a Human Being (2016)

Singles from Zaba
- 1. "Black Mambo" Released: 16 June 2013; 2. "Gooey" Released: 14 February 2014; 3. "Pools" Released: 17 April 2014; 4. "Hazey" Released: 13 October 2014

Zaba (stylised as ZABA) is the debut studio album by English rock group Glass Animals, released on 9 June 2014 by Wolf Tone and Caroline International and on 17 June 2014 by Harvest Records in the US.

== Background ==
Interest first arose in Glass Animals after the release of their debut extended play Leaflings on independent label Kaya Kaya Records, a subsidiary and imprint of XL Recordings, part of the Beggars Group of labels. After they became the first act to be signed to Wolf Tone, the record label of British producer Paul Epworth, they released their second, self-titled EP. A song from the EP, "Black Mambo", in addition to a re-recorded version of "Cocoa Hooves" from Leaflings, appears on Zaba, expanding the promotion of the album. Glass Animals also gained exposure in Europe by playing opening act on European shows of St. Vincent, Metronomy, Yeasayer and others. Zaba performed particularly well on the Australian charts, following three headline shows in the country and an appearance and regular airplay on Australian radio station Triple J. The album reached number 12 on the ARIA Charts.

== Composition ==
Zaba is primarily a psychedelic indie pop record. The album's sound is characterized by obscure tropical percussion and jungle timbres. This musical motif reflects lead singer David Bayley's exotic subject matter, which was inspired by the William Steig children's book The Zabajaba Jungle. To achieve this sound, Bayley would record ambient sounds of a field near his house or the chewing of rabbits and other animals, and percussive sounds of cooking utensils and children's toys. Some of the songs were based specifically on certain adventure novels: "Toes", for example, intends to recreate the atmosphere of The Island of Doctor Moreau and Heart of Darkness.

Various music critics have indicated that Zaba holds strong R&B influences, particularly in its use of "hard-hitting" hip-hop basslines, pop-influenced melodies, and husky vocals with a lyrical focus on sensuality. Additionally, Zaba is regularly noted for its subtle electronica influences and use of synthesizers. This is evident on the first track of the album, "Flip", which begins as a slow, seductive build of understated electronica and dream pop evocative of Jamie xx and Flying Lotus. The song then "erupting" into a "warm" wash of electronics and bass sounds; its deep, "sticky" beat is paired with percussion to form a "sonic honeycomb". "Black Mambo" opens with a similar steady build, and leads with pizzicato strings which "cascade" over xylophones into rich, soulful vocal harmonies.

Throughout its composition, Zaba explores the concept of minimalism, allowing the beats, melodies, and lyrics to "speak for themselves". The songs feature sparse, uncluttered, groove-driven electronic structures and mix soulful vocals, R&B beats, and gentle percussion with unobtrusive synths and light, glitchy electronica. Zaba's songs are connected by self-described "interludes" of echoed electronics, varied percussion, and smooth jazz, weaving them together so that while each individual track is distinctive, the album "melts" into a single, mellow groove. Carey Hodges of Paste noted that the "danceable" music on Zaba contains "bizarre, gorgeous, playful" dark atmospheres, saying it's "ideal for lazy Sunday mornings and hazy Friday nights".

The band were regularly placed out of their comfort zone while recording Zaba. Speaking on the recording of the album, Bayley said: "We were really worried about what our friends and family would think, basically. We kept everything quite toned down, and then we spent six or seven months experimenting, trying to find out what to do on the record, and after we finished those tracks, we had a much better idea of what we needed to do and how we wanted to sound." Executive producer Paul Epworth was the source of more unorthodox recording methods in the studio, particularly in the vocal take of "Gooey", during which Bayley laid down his vocals holding a pineapple named "Sasha Fierce", and recorded the final chorus in eight different impressions, including "an old woman, a drunk crack addict, [and] a terrible impression of James Brown" to replicate the sound of a choir. Nevertheless, Bayley assured that Epworth was a positive influence on the band: "He's a really great producer, he knows how to make everyone feel really relaxed and push you out of your comfort zone so you're not just regurgitating ideas but coming up with new ones and trying things out – even if they don't work."

== Critical reception ==
Professional ratings
Aggregate scores
Source	Rating
AnyDecentMusic?	7.3/10
Metacritic	77/100
Review scores
Source	Rating
AllMusic	3.5/5 stars
Clash	8/10
DIY	4/5 stars
Drowned in Sound	5/10
NME	8/10
The Observer	3/5 stars
Paste	9.0/10
Q	4/5 stars
The Skinny	4/5 stars
Uncut	7/10

Zaba received generally favourable reviews, with an aggregated score of 77 out of 100 on Metacritic, based on 12 reviews.

== Commercial performance ==
As of October 2016, Zaba has sold 600,000 equivalent copies worldwide. It charted at No.12 in Australia and No.92 in the UK, where it has sold 18,824 copies, 6,515 of them as streams, according to the Official Charts Company.

As of October 2015, the LP has sold over 190,000 units in the US, and peaked at No.1 on the Alternative New Artist Chart after 64 weeks.

== Track listing ==
All songs written, composed, and produced by Dave Bayley.

Zaba – Standard edition
No.	Title	Length
1.	"Flip"	3:42
2.	"Black Mambo"	4:08
3.	"Pools"	4:48
4.	"Gooey"	4:49
5.	"Walla Walla"	3:37
6.	"Intruxx"	2:49
7.	"Hazey"	4:25
8.	"Toes"	4:14
9.	"Wyrd"	4:05
10.	"Cocoa Hooves"	4:31
11.	"JDNT" (on some CD versions, the track length is 8:53 and contains the previously released song "Psylla" from the Glass Animals EP as a hidden track beginning at 5:24)	4:24
Total length:		45:31

Zaba – iTunes deluxe edition
No.	Title	Length
12.	"Psylla"	3:31
13.	"Exxus"	4:19
14.	"Black Mambo" (Zodiac Remix)	3:40
15.	"Gooey" (Gilligan Moss Remix)	5:39
Total length:		62:40

Zaba – Amazon deluxe edition
No.	Title	Length
12.	"Black Mambo" (Stripped)	3:51
13.	"Gooey" (Stripped)	4:08
14.	"Hazey" (Stripped)	3:49
15.	"Cocoa Hooves" (Stripped)	3:36
Total length:		60:55

== Personnel ==
- David Bayley – producer
- David Wrench – mixing
- Glass Animals – primary artist, engineer
- Joseph Hartwell Jones – engineer
- Mandy Parnell – mastering
- Matt Wiggins – engineer
- Micah Lidberg – artwork, illustrations
- Paul Epworth – executive producer

== Charts ==
Chart (2014)	Peak position
Australian Albums (ARIA)	12
Belgian Albums (Ultratop Wallonia)	162
US Billboard 200	177
US Top Rock Albums (Billboard)	27

== Certifications ==
Region	Certification	Certified units/sales
New Zealand (RMNZ)	Gold	7,500^{‡}
^{‡} Sales+streaming figures based on certification alone.
