= We'll Be Together Again =

1945 song

Song
- Published: 1945 by Marmor Music
- Songwriter: Frankie Laine
- Composer: Carl T. Fischer

"We'll Be Together Again" is a 1945 popular song composed by Carl T. Fischer, with lyrics by Frankie Laine.

Fischer was Laine's pianist and musical director when he composed the tune, and Laine was asked to write the lyrics for it. Terry Fischer (the wife of Carl T. Fischer) was the first to release the song, followed by the Pied Pipers, and as well as Laine, it has since been recorded by such notable vocalists as Billie Holiday, Frank Sinatra, Louis Armstrong, Rosemary Clooney, Lou Rawls and Tony Bennett.

== Recordings ==
- Stan Kenton – On AFRS: 1944–45 (vocal: Gene Howard)
- Bing Crosby recorded the song in 1956 for use on his radio show and it was subsequently included in the box set The Bing Crosby CBS Radio Recordings (1954–56) issued by Mosaic Records (catalog MD7-245) in 2009.
- Frank Sinatra – Songs for Swingin' Lovers! (1956)
- Ella Fitzgerald – Like Someone in Love (1957)
- Billie Holiday – All or Nothing at All (1959)
- Sammy Davis Jr. - Sammy Davis Jr. Sings and Laurindo Almeida Plays (1966).
- Julie London – Easy Does It (1968)
- Tony Bennett and Bill Evans - The Tony Bennett/Bill Evans Album (1975)
- Dianne Reeves – A Little Moonlight (2003)
