= You're a Wonderful One =

"You're A Wonderful One"

Single by Marvin Gaye

from the album How Sweet It Is to Be Loved by You
- B-side: "When I'm Alone I Cry"
- Released: February 20, 1964
- Recorded: January 6, 1964, Hitsville, USA, Detroit, Michigan
- Genre: R&B, soul
- Length: 2:45
- Label: Tamla
- Songwriter: Holland–Dozier–Holland
- Producers: Brian Holland; Lamont Dozier

Marvin Gaye singles chronology
"Can I Get a Witness" (1963)	"You're A Wonderful One" (1964)	"Once Upon a Time" (1964)

"You're a Wonderful One" is a popular recording written by Holland–Dozier–Holland and recorded and released as a single by Marvin Gaye, released in 1964 on the Tamla label. It charted at #15 on the Billboard Hot 100.

In the song, the narrator praises his "wonderful one" for loving him and for being "always around" him. Gaye is helped along on this song by the Supremes on background. The group had earlier backed him on "Can I Get a Witness". Musically, the Funk Brothers took elements of Chuck Berry's "Memphis" single and incorporated it into the intro of this song. The song eventually charted at number fifteen on the pop charts and number three on the R&B singles chart.

Billboard described the song as "another stomper somewhat in the 'Can I Get a Witness' vein," stating that it "pumps along on middle tempo with fine, shouting chorus in support." Cash Box described it as "an engaging romancer...that moves along at a steady driving, thump-a-rhythmic beat" with a "sensational job by Marvin and his combo-choral support."

It was produced by Holland–Dozier–Holland, who worked with Gaye on "Witness" and later "How Sweet It Is (To Be Loved by You)" by Gaye a few months later giving him his biggest success as a solo artist until "I Heard It Through the Grapevine" in 1968.

== Personnel ==
- Lead vocals by Marvin Gaye
- Background vocals by the Supremes
- Instrumentation by the Funk Brothers
