= Do Re Mi (musical) =

Musical

- Original Broadway Cast Recording
- Music: Jule Styne
- Lyrics: Betty Comden; Adolph Green
- Book: Garson Kanin
- Productions: 1960 Broadway; 1961 West End; 1999 Broadway concert

Do Re Mi is a musical with music by Jule Styne, lyrics by Betty Comden and Adolph Green, and a book by Garson Kanin, who also directed the original 1960 Broadway production. The plot centers on a minor-league con man who decides to go (somewhat) straight by moving into the legitimate business of juke boxes and music promotion. The musical was headlined by the comedy couple of Phil Silvers and Nancy Walker, both of whom were Tony nominated. Popular songs introduced included "Cry Like the Wind" and "Make Someone Happy".

== Synopsis ==
Hubie Cram is "a loser endlessly scheming to win big." His long-suffering and patient wife Kay urges him to "Take a Job," while he plots. He finds three pals, Fatso O'Rear, Brains Berman and Skin Demopoulos, and they scheme to enter the juke-box business ("It's Legitimate"). Soon they have 300 juke-boxes, which they plan on selling to John Henry Wheeler, a record producer. Hubie discovers a naive singer, Tilda Mullen, and they plan their future ("Ambition"). At a fancy nightclub Hubie explains, and demonstrates, gangster's behavior that he learned from watching the Late Late Show. Kay compares her abandoned comfortable existence with the insecurity of life with Hubie ("Adventure"). Tilda and Wheeler fall in love ("Make Someone Happy"). In the end Hubie realizes that he has nothing except a wonderful marriage.

== Design elements ==
The musical was notable for its elaborate scenic design by Boris Aronson, who conceived the set as an enormous pop-art jukebox, and used extremely novel forms such as collage in his design. The curtain of juke boxes "evoked a cathedral's stained-glass effect." In a scene in a night club, the tables had drawn figures instead of actors, and the actors would talk with these drawings. (A similar design and staging conceit was seen when Silvers guest-starred in a 1967 TV adaptation of Damn Yankees!) And in the "Fireworks" number, black light is used to reveal shooting stars and Roman candles as Tilda and John's love affair explodes in song.

== Songs ==
Act I

- "Waiting, Waiting" – Kay Cram.
- "All You Need Is a Quarter" – The Swingers.
- "Take a Job" – Hubie and Kay Cram.
- "It's Legitimate" – Hubie, Fatso O'Rear, Brains Berman, Skin Demopoulos and the Loaders.
- "I Know About Love" – John Henry Wheeler.
- "The Auditions" – Marsha, Lou and Gretchen.
- "Cry Like the Wind" – Tilda Mullen.
- "Ambition" – Hubie and Tilda Mullen.
- "Success" – The Tilda Mullen Fans, Tilda Mullen, Hubie, Fatso O'Rear, Brains Berman and Skin Demopoulos.
- "Fireworks" – Tilda Mullen and John Henry Wheeler.
- "What's New at the Zoo" – Tilda Mullen and Animal Girls.
- "Asking for You" – John Henry Wheeler.
- "The Late, Late Show" – Hubie.

Act II

- "Adventure" – Hubie and Kay Cram.
- "Make Someone Happy" – John Henry Wheeler and Tilda Mullen.
- "Don't Be Ashamed of a Teardrop" – Hubie, Fatso O'Rear, Brains Berman and Skin Demopoulos.
- "V.I.P." – The Public and Hubie.
- "All of My Life" – Hubie.
- Finale – Hubie, Kay Cram and Company.

== Casts ==
Overview of casts of Do Re Mi
Character	Original Broadway Cast (1960)	Original West End Cast (1961)	Encores! Cast (1999)
Hubert Cram	Phil Silvers	Max Bygraves	Nathan Lane
Kay Cram	Nancy Walker	Maggie Fitzgibbon	Randy Graff
John Henry Wheeler	John Reardon	Steve Arlen	Brian Stokes Mitchell
Tilda Mullen	Nancy Dussault	Jan Waters	Heather Headley
Fatso O'Rear	George Mathews	Danny Green	Lee Wilkof
Skin Demopoulos	George Givot	David Lander	Stephen DeRosa
Brains Berman	David Burns	Harry Ross	Lewis J. Stadlen
Moe Shtarker	Al Lewis	Norman Mitchell	Michael Mulheren
Marsha Denkler	Carolyn Ragaini	Joyce Endean	Marilyn Cooper
Irving Feinberg	Steve Roland		Gerry Vichi
Gretchen Mulhausen	Betty Kent	Elizabeth Reid	Tovah Feldshuh

In the original Broadway production, the understudy for Hubert Cram was Bernie West. Brad Oscar appeared in the ensemble of the 1999 Encores! production.

== Productions ==
The musical opened on Broadway at the St. James Theatre on December 26, 1960, transferred to the 54th Street Theatre on December 25, 1961 and closed on January 13, 1962 for a total of 400 performances. Scenic design was by Boris Aronson, assisted by Ming Cho Lee and Lisa Jalowetz, costume design by Irene Sharaff with assistance from Florence Klotz, and choreography was by Marc Breaux and Dee Dee Wood. The producer was David Merrick.

The West End production opened at the Prince of Wales Theatre on October 12, 1961 and ran for 169 performances. It starred Max Bygraves, Maggie Fitzgibbon, and Jan Waters.

Encores! at the New York City Center presented a concert version in 1999 directed by John Rando, choreographed by Randy Skinner and starring Nathan Lane, Brian Stokes Mitchell, Heather Headley and Randy Graff.

The 42nd Street Moon theatre company, San Francisco, California concert version ran in August 2001.

Porchlight Music Theatre, Chicago, Illinois, presented Do Re Mi as a part of their "Porchlight Revisits" season in which they stage forgotten musicals three times per year. The production was in May 2018. It was directed and choreographed by Christopher Pazdernik and music directed by David Fiorello.

The J2 Spotlight Musical Theatre Company, an Off-Broadway theatre company dedicated to producing revivals of worthy musicals, will produce Do, Re, Mi as part of their 2024 season in April 2024.

== Recordings ==
The Original Broadway cast recording was released in January 1961 on RCA Victor. The 1999 Encores! cast recording was released on September 21, 1999 by DRG.

In 1961, June Christy and Bob Cooper recorded the album Do-Re-Mi consisting of selections from the musical.

Numbers from both the New York and London productions were also restaged on television for The Ed Sullivan Show and the Royal Variety Performance.

== Response ==
The New York Times called the musical "fast, loud and occasionally funny." It noted that "a team of expensive talent has turned out some lively songs, set them in motion in feverishly paced production numbers and has managed to overcome, at least part of the time, the cheapness of a machine-made book." It commented that Phil Silvers was cast against type, here playing "the fall guy, the poor sap who ends as the victim.... Betty Comden and Adolph Green have written sprightly lyrics, and Jule Styne has contributed some attractive as well as some ear-shattering tunes. The loveliest is "Cry Like the Wind" which has the keening quality of a folk song of lamentation."

According to Stanley Green, the musical had "an average score that is worth the price just to hear Miss Walker describe her life of 'Adventure'". Ethan Mordden wrote that the song "Adventure" is "one of the grandest comedy songs ever.... Here we learn that she, at least, already knows that it's a wonderful marriage, because it's never boring ... then came a Mad Scene - a bolero complete with trumpets pealing out like the band in the Plaza del Toro on corrida day and woodwinds tripping up the scale with the flash of a hundred capes."

In reviewing the 1999 "Encores!" production for The New York Times, Ben Brantley wrote that, despite its famous creators, "the show still has the incomplete feeling of a work that never quite meets its own aspirations... A tale of buffoonish gangsters trying to muscle in on the music industry." He further suggested that the show was like a "shotgun marriage" of Bye Bye Birdie and Guys and Dolls with parts of the television sit-com The Honeymooners.

== Awards and nominations ==
=== Original Broadway production ===
Year	Award	Category	Nominee	Result
1961	Tony Award	Best Musical		Nominated
1961	Tony Award	Best Actor in a Musical	Phil Silvers	Nominated
1961	Tony Award	Best Actress in a Musical	Nancy Walker	Nominated
1961	Tony Award	Best Featured Actress in a Musical	Nancy Dussault	Nominated
1961	Tony Award	Best Direction of a Musical	Garson Kanin	Nominated
1961	Theatre World Award		Nancy Dussault	Won

== "Make Someone Happy" ==
The song "Make Someone Happy" has been recorded by numerous artists, including:

- Perry Como on his subsequent 1962 RCA Camden album Make Someone Happy (US #80, 1960)
- June Christy for her album Do-Re-Mi (1961)
- Doris Day for her album Bright and Shiny (1961)
- Coleman Hawkins for his album Coleman Hawkins Plays Make Someone Happy from Do Re Mi (1962)
- Aretha Franklin for her album Laughing on the Outside (1963)
- Sergio Franchi for his album Broadway, I Love You (1963)
- Joni James for her album Something for the Boys (1963)
- Steve Lawrence and Eydie Gorme for their album Two on the Aisle (1963)
- Dinah Washington for her album Dinah '63 (1963)
- Sammy Davis Jr. for his album The Shelter of Your Arms (1964)
- Jimmy Durante for his album Jimmy Durante's Way of Life... (1964); also appeared on the soundtrack of the film Sleepless in Seattle (1993)
- Judy Garland for her album "Live" at the London Palladium (1965)
- The Supremes for their unreleased album There's a Place for Us (1965) and their live album At the Copa (1965)
- Four Tops, from On Broadway (1967)
- We Five for their album Make Someone Happy (1967)
- Bill Evans for his album Alone (Again) (recorded in December 1975 but not released until 1977)
- Tony Bennett and Bill Evans for their album Together Again (1977)
- Florence Henderson for an episode of The Brady Bunch Variety Hour (1977)
- Vic Damone for his album Make Someone Happy (1981)
- Tierney Sutton for her album On the Other Side (2007)
- Sophie Milman for her album Make Someone Happy (2007)
- Kelli O'Hara for her album Wonder in the World (2008)
- Barbra Streisand for her album Love Is the Answer (2009)
- Bill Nighy for the film Arthur Christmas (2011)
- Audra McDonald for her album Go Back Home (2013)
- Jamie Cullum for his album Interlude (2014)
- Jeff Goldblum & The Mildred Snitzer Orchestra for their album I Shouldn't Be Telling You This (2019) (featuring Gregory Porter)
