= My Foolish Heart (song) =

1949 popular music song

Song
- Published: 1949
- Genre: Jazz
- Composer: Victor Young
- Lyricist: Ned Washington

"My Foolish Heart" is a popular song and jazz standard that was published in 1949. In the UK, the song reached number one on the chart based on sales of sheet music, staying at the top spot for 11 weeks in 1950.

== Overview ==
The music was composed by Victor Young, and the lyric was written by Ned Washington. The song was introduced by singer Martha Mears in the 1949 film of the same name. The song failed to escape critics' general laceration of the film. Time wrote in its review that "nothing offsets the blight of such tear-splashed excesses as the bloop-bleep-bloop of a sentimental ballad on the sound track." Nevertheless, the song was nominated for the Academy Award for Best Original Song in 1949, but lost out to "Baby, It's Cold Outside" by Frank Loesser.

== Cover versions ==
- The song was also a popular success, with two recordings of the song listed among the top 30 on the Billboard charts in 1950. Gordon Jenkins's recording of "My Foolish Heart", Sandy Evans, vocal, reached the top 10 on the charts. However, Billy Eckstine's version became a million-seller, spending 19 weeks on the charts and peaking at number six. Other successful versions in 1950 were by Mindy Carson, Margaret Whiting, Richard Hayes, and Hugo Winterhalter.
- A contemporary British cover by Steve Conway was released on Columbia Records.
- Bing Crosby debuted his version on radio on The Bing Crosby – Chesterfield Show, broadcast Wednesday March 8, 1950.
- The Demensions charted with an orchestral, sophisticated, doo-wop version in 1963 at number 95, featuring the blended harmonies of Lenny Dell, Phil del Giudice, Howie Margolin, and Marisa Martelli, in a unique arrangement with an added introductory stanza, directed by Henry Jerome, released on the Coral Records label.
- The Tony Bennett/Bill Evans Album (1975)
- Roberta Flack on her 1991 album Set the Night to Music, issued as the A-side and B-side#B-side to the single "You Make Me Feel Brand New"
- Susannah McCorkle on her 1992 album I'll Take Romance
- Kurt Elling on his 1998 album This Time It's Love
- Ralph Towner recorded it as the title track of his 2017 solo guitar album for ECM Records.
