= How to Be a Human Being =

2016 studio album by Glass Animals

Studio album by Glass Animals
- Released: 26 August 2016
- Studios: Wolf Tone Studios (London, England)
- Genres: Indie pop, indie rock, electronic rock, R&B, hip hop, trip hop, psychedelic pop
- Length: 43:16
- Labels: Wolf Tone; Caroline
- Producers: Dave Bayley; John Bettis

Glass Animals chronology
Zaba (2014)	How to Be a Human Being (2016)	Dreamland (2020)

Singles from How to Be a Human Being
- 1. "Life Itself" Released: 18 May 2016; 2. "Youth" Released: 27 July 2016; 3. "Season 2 Episode 3" Released: 23 August 2016

Professional ratings
Aggregate scores
Source	Rating
AnyDecentMusic?	7.5/10
Metacritic	74/100
Review scores
Source	Rating
AllMusic	3.5/5 stars
Consequence of Sound	B
DIY	4/5 stars
Financial Times	4/5 stars
The Guardian	4/5 stars
Mixmag	9/10
Mojo	3/5 stars
NME	4/5
Q	2/5 stars
The Skinny	4/5 stars

How to Be a Human Being is the second studio album by English indie rock group Glass Animals. It was released on 26 August 2016 by Wolf Tone and Caroline International in Europe, and Harvest Records in the United States. Each of the eleven songs throughout the album represent a different person on the front cover and their experiences.

The album received generally favourable reviews from music critics, who complimented its "sense of wonder" and "immediate impression", but felt it was somewhat premature. The album was nominated for the 2017 Mercury Prize.

== Background ==
Following the release of their debut studio album Zaba, Glass Animals began an aggressive tour which saw them play over 140 concerts in Europe, Australia, the United States and Mexico. They appeared at Glastonbury, Falls Music Festival and Southbound in 2014, Coachella, Wakarusa, Bonnaroo, Firefly, Glastonbury again, Lollapalooza, Osheaga and Reading and Leeds in 2015, and the Forecastle Festival in 2016.

How to Be a Human Being was simultaneously announced with the release of "Life Itself" and its respective music video. The foursome toured Australia for their second time, before they returned to North America for the album's release. Four days after the album was released, the band appeared on Jimmy Kimmel Live!, their third appearance on primetime television.

The band wrote eleven songs based on eleven different characters, many of which were inspired by people they met and stories they were told during their travels while promoting Zaba. Each character was portrayed on the album cover, and some appeared in music videos for their respective songs.

== Commercial performance ==
The album made a debut on US charts with first week sales of 14,575 copies, with 10,117 being pure album sales.

== Track listing ==
All tracks are written by David Bayley, except where noted.

No.	Title	Writer(s)	Length
1.	"Life Itself"	Bayley; Tariq Tafo	4:41
2.	"Youth"		3:51
3.	"Season 2 Episode 3"	Bayley; Ben McFadden	4:04
4.	"Pork Soda"		4:14
5.	"Mama's Gun"	Bayley; John Bettis; Richard Carpenter	4:27
6.	"Cane Shuga"		3:17
7.	"[Premade Sandwiches] (Note: On CD copies of the album, "Premade Sandwiches" is put at the end of the track "Cane Shuga" instead of being its own track.)"		0:36
8.	"The Other Side of Paradise"		5:21
9.	"Take a Slice"		3:50
10.	"Poplar St"		4:23
11.	"Agnes"		4:32
Total length:			43:16

== Personnel ==
Glass Animals

- Dave Bayley – vocals, programming, production (all tracks), guitar (1, 2, 4, 5, 8–10), percussion (1–5, 8–11); keyboards, synthesizer (1, 3–5, 8–11); art direction, design
- Drew MacFarlane – programming (1, 3–11), percussion (1–5, 8–11), keyboards, synthesizer (1, 3–5, 8–11), additional vocals (3, 8), guitar (4, 5, 9, 10), piano (11)
- Edmund Irwin-Singer – programming (1, 3–11), keyboards (1, 3–5, 8–11), percussion (1–5, 8–11); piano, synthesizer (1, 3–5, 8–11)
- Joe Seaward – drums, percussion (1–5, 8–11); additional vocals (4), programming (6, 7)

Additional personnel

- Tom Coyne – mastering
- David Wrench – mixing (1, 3, 5, 8, 9, 11)
- Matt Wiggins – mixing (2, 4, 6, 7, 10), engineering (all tracks)
- Riley MacIntyre – engineering assistance
- Marta Salogni – mixing assistance
- Mat Cook – art direction, design
- Neil Krug – photography
- Charlie Seaward – flute (5)
- Paul Epworth – executive production

== Charts ==
Chart (2016)	Peak position
Australian Albums (ARIA)	11
Belgian Albums (Ultratop Flanders)	68
Belgian Albums (Ultratop Wallonia)	151
Canadian Albums (Billboard)	50
Dutch Albums (Album Top 100)	77
French Albums (SNEP)	120
New Zealand Heatseeker Albums (RMNZ)	2
Swiss Albums (Schweizer Hitparade)	87
UK Albums (Official Charts)	23
US Billboard 200	20
US Top Rock Albums (Billboard)	2

== Certifications ==
Region	Certification	Certified units/sales
Australia (ARIA)	Gold	35,000^{‡}
United Kingdom (BPI)	Gold	100,000^{‡}
^{‡} Sales+streaming figures based on certification alone.
