= Alone (Again) =

1977 solo piano album by Bill Evans

Studio album by Bill Evans
- Released: Early December 1977
- Recorded: December 16–18, 1975
- Studio: Fantasy Studios, Berkeley
- Genre: Jazz
- Length: 43:07
- Label: Fantasy; F 9542
- Producer: Helen Keane

Bill Evans chronology
Montreux III (1975)	Alone (Again) (1977)	Quintessence (1976)

Alone (Again) is a solo piano album by American jazz pianist Bill Evans, recorded in December 1975. A follow-up to his earlier solo album Alone, it was released in 1977 on Fantasy Records and reissued on CD in 1994 by Original Jazz Classics. At the time it was recorded, Evans had been playing an increasing number of solo dates and was inspired after hearing Marian McPartland play solo in Monterey. Evans's manager Helen Keane commented:

As much as Bill enjoyed playing alone at home, and although by this time he regularly included a solo section in his concert program, he found recording in this context very difficult. It was probably the only area he felt insecure about musically, and the fact that he'd gotten a Grammy for Alone didn't seem to help.

== Repertoire ==
As with Alone, the album consists of five jazz standards, none originals, with the last track, in this case "People," receiving an especially extended treatment. Evans had first recorded "The Touch of Your Lips" with Art Farmer back in 1958, and just a few months earlier, he had recorded a vocal version with Tony Bennett. He had recorded Dave Brubeck's "In Your Own Sweet Way" in 1962 for the trio album How My Heart Sings!, and he returned to it live for the rest of his life. "Make Someone Happy" and "What Kind of Fool Am I?" had been in his repertoire since the early 60s, also; the latter was recorded at least eight times, this version being the last. "People," which is given an epic performance, was the only song new for him, and he never recorded it again.

== Reception ==
Professional ratings
Review scores
Source	Rating
AllMusic	2.5/5 stars
The Penguin Guide to Jazz Recordings	3.5/4 stars
The Rolling Stone Jazz Record Guide	3/5 stars

As with its predecessor, the album was nominated for a Grammy Award, but this time the pianist didn't win.

Writing for AllMusic, Scott Yanow said that "Evans plays well enough on this set of unaccompanied solos (reissued on CD), but the material is generally not worth the intense explorations that it receives."

Evans biographer Peter Pettinger says, "The weight of the album lay in Jule Styne's showstopper 'People,' from Funny Girl, here receiving the full rhapsodic treatment. Rendering a Wagner opera at home Evans would have sounded much like this. On this track he hardly improvised in the usual jazz sense at all; rather, he created interest with inner figurations and fluctuating grades of tone color. He made the song see-saw several times between the keys of Bb and E, two tonalities that enjoy a special relationship for musicians, being equidistant by a tritone."

== Track listing ==
1. "The Touch of Your Lips" (Ray Noble) – 7:07
2. "In Your Own Sweet Way" (Dave Brubeck) – 8:59
3. "Make Someone Happy" (Jule Styne, Betty Comden, Adolph Green) – 7:14
4. "What Kind of Fool Am I?" (Leslie Bricusse, Anthony Newley) – 6:10
5. "People" (Jule Styne, Bob Merrill) – 13:37

== Personnel ==
- Bill Evans – piano

=== Additional personnel ===
- Helen Keane – producer
- Ray Hall – engineer
- Dennis Drake – remastering
- Richard Seidel – liner notes

== Chart positions ==
Year	Chart	Position
1978	Billboard Jazz Albums	31
