= Marvin Gaye Recorded Live on Stage =

Live album by Marvin Gaye
- Released: September 9, 1963
- Recorded: 1963
- Venue: Regal Theater, Chicago
- Genre: Rhythm and blues
- Length: 25:35
- Label: Tamla
- Producer: William "Mickey" Stevenson

Marvin Gaye chronology
| That Stubborn Kinda Fellow (1963) | Marvin Gaye Recorded Live on Stage (1963) | When I'm Alone I Cry (1964) |

Marvin Gaye Recorded Live on Stage is the first live album released by singer Marvin Gaye on the Tamla label. Recorded during a Motortown Revue show at Chicago's Regal Theater, the album showcased the musician performing early hits such as "Stubborn Kind of Fellow", "Pride and Joy" and "Hitch Hike" while also adding in unreleased songs including "One of These Days" (a studio version was released on the B-side of "Pride and Joy" and later as a track on Gaye's 1966 album, Moods of Marvin Gaye), "Mo Jo Hanna" and That Stubborn Kinda Fellow album track, "Get My Hands on Some Lovin'" while also singing three covers - the jazz standard, "Days of Wine and Roses", blues song "Mo Jo Hanna" and his cover of Ray Charles' R&B version of "You Are My Sunshine".

== History ==
Gaye was accompanied throughout the album by Martha and the Vandellas. During these early days and later into his career, Gaye had stage fright and struggled with live performances. Despite this, he performed to enthusiastic audiences, who cheered him on throughout his set. He recorded another live album in the 1960s, the shelved Marvin Gaye at the Copa, Marvin Gaye Live! in 1974, and finally released another live effort in 1977, Live at the London Palladium.

== Track listing ==
Side one

1. "Stubborn Kind of Fellow" (Marvin Gaye, George Gordy, William "Mickey" Stevenson)
2. "One of These Days" (William "Mickey" Stevenson)
3. "Mo Jo Hanna" (Andre Williams, Clarence Paul)
4. "The Days of Wine and Roses" (Henry Mancini, Johnny Mercer)

Side two

1. "Pride and Joy" (Marvin Gaye, William "Mickey" Stevenson, Norman Whitfield)
2. "Hitch Hike" (Marvin Gaye, Clarence Paul, William "Mickey" Stevenson)
3. "Get My Hands on Some Lovin'" (Marvin Gaye, William "Mickey" Stevenson)
4. "You Are My Sunshine" (Jimmie Davis, Charles Mitchell)
