= Marvin Gaye =

American singer and songwriter (1939–1984)

- Gaye in 1973
- Born: Marvin Pentz Gay Jr. April 2, 1939; Washington, D.C., U.S.
- Died: April 1, 1984 (aged 44); Los Angeles, California, U.S.
- Cause of death: Gunshot wounds
- Occupations: Singer; musician; songwriter; record producer
- Years active: 1957–1984
- Spouse: Anna Gordy (m. 1963; div. 1977) Janis Hunter (m. 1977; div. 1982)
- Children: 3, including Nona
- Parents: Alberta Gay; Marvin Gay Sr.
- Relatives: Frankie Gaye (brother)
- Awards: Full list
- Musical career
- Origin: Detroit, Michigan
- Genres: Soul; R&B; jazz; funk
- Instruments: Vocals; piano; keyboards; drums; percussion
- Works: Discography
- Labels: Tamla; Tamla-Motown; Columbia
- Formerly of: The Marquees; The Moonglows

Marvin Pentz Gaye Jr. (né Gay; April 2, 1939 – April 1, 1984) was an American R&B and soul singer, songwriter, musician, and record producer. Commonly referred to as the "Prince of Motown" and "Prince of Soul", he helped to shape the sound of Motown and soul music in the 1960s and 1970s. A cultural icon, Gaye is often considered one of the greatest singers and songwriters of all time.

Born and raised in Washington, D.C., Gaye began his career being guided by Harvey Fuqua, who put him in his group, Harvey and the Moonglows, before Gaye ventured into a solo career at the beginning of the 1960s. Signing to Motown's Tamla subsidiary, he achieved stardom with a series of hit singles such as "How Sweet It Is (to Be Loved by You)", "Ain't That Peculiar" and "I Heard It Through the Grapevine" and also earned success as a collaborative duet partner with several female artists, most notably, Diana Ross and Tammi Terrell, the latter of whom recorded the hits "Ain't No Mountain High Enough" and "You're All I Need to Get By". Following the successful release of his landmark album, What's Going On and its hit of the same name, in 1971, Gaye became one of the first Motown artists to break away from the reins of a production company, later producing the albums, Let's Get It On, I Want You and Here, My Dear.

After a period as a tax exile in Europe from 1980 to 1981 and leaving Motown for Columbia Records in 1982, Gaye re-emerged that year with "Sexual Healing" and its album, Midnight Love, which became his most successful single and album respectively to date and performed a memorable rendition of "The Star-Spangled Banner" at the 1983 NBA All-Star Game. The success of "Sexual Healing" led to Gaye winning an American Music Award and two Grammy Awards.

On April 1, 1984, Gaye was shot and killed by his father, Marvin Gay Sr. at his parents' house in Western Heights, Los Angeles, on the eve of his 45th birthday. Gay Sr. later pleaded no contest to voluntary manslaughter, receiving a six-year suspended sentence and five years of probation.

In addition to 1960s soul music, Gaye also influenced 1970s soul music and his recordings of that era later influenced the R&B subgenres quiet storm and neo soul. Several of his hit singles and albums have made several best-of Rolling Stone lists, including its greatest albums and greatest songs of all time.

In addition to the two Grammys and American Music Award, Gaye's accolades include the Grammy Lifetime Achievement Award, a Hollywood Walk of Fame star and inductions into the NAACP Hall of Fame, National Rhythm and Blues Hall of Fame, Songwriters Hall of Fame and the Rock and Roll Hall of Fame.

== Early life ==
Marvin Pentz Gay Jr. was born on April 2, 1939, at Freedman's Hospital in Washington, D.C., to church minister Marvin Gay Sr. and domestic worker Alberta Gay (née Cooper). His first home was in a public housing project, the Fairfax Apartments (now demolished) at 1617 1st Street SW in the Southwest Waterfront neighborhood. Although it was one of the city's oldest neighborhoods, with many elegant Federal-style homes, most buildings were small, in disrepair, and lacking electricity and running water. The alleys were full of one- and two-story shacks, and nearly every dwelling was overcrowded. Gaye and his friends nicknamed the area "Simple City", calling it "half-city, half country". (Note: This area should not be confused with the present-day Benning Terrace public housing complex in the Benning Ridge neighborhood, which today is also nicknamed "Simple City".)

Gaye was the second of the couple's four children. He had two sisters, Jeanne and Zeola, and one brother, Frankie Gaye. He also had two half-brothers: Michael Cooper, his mother's son from a previous relationship, and Antwaun Carey Gay, born as a result of one of his father's extramarital affairs.

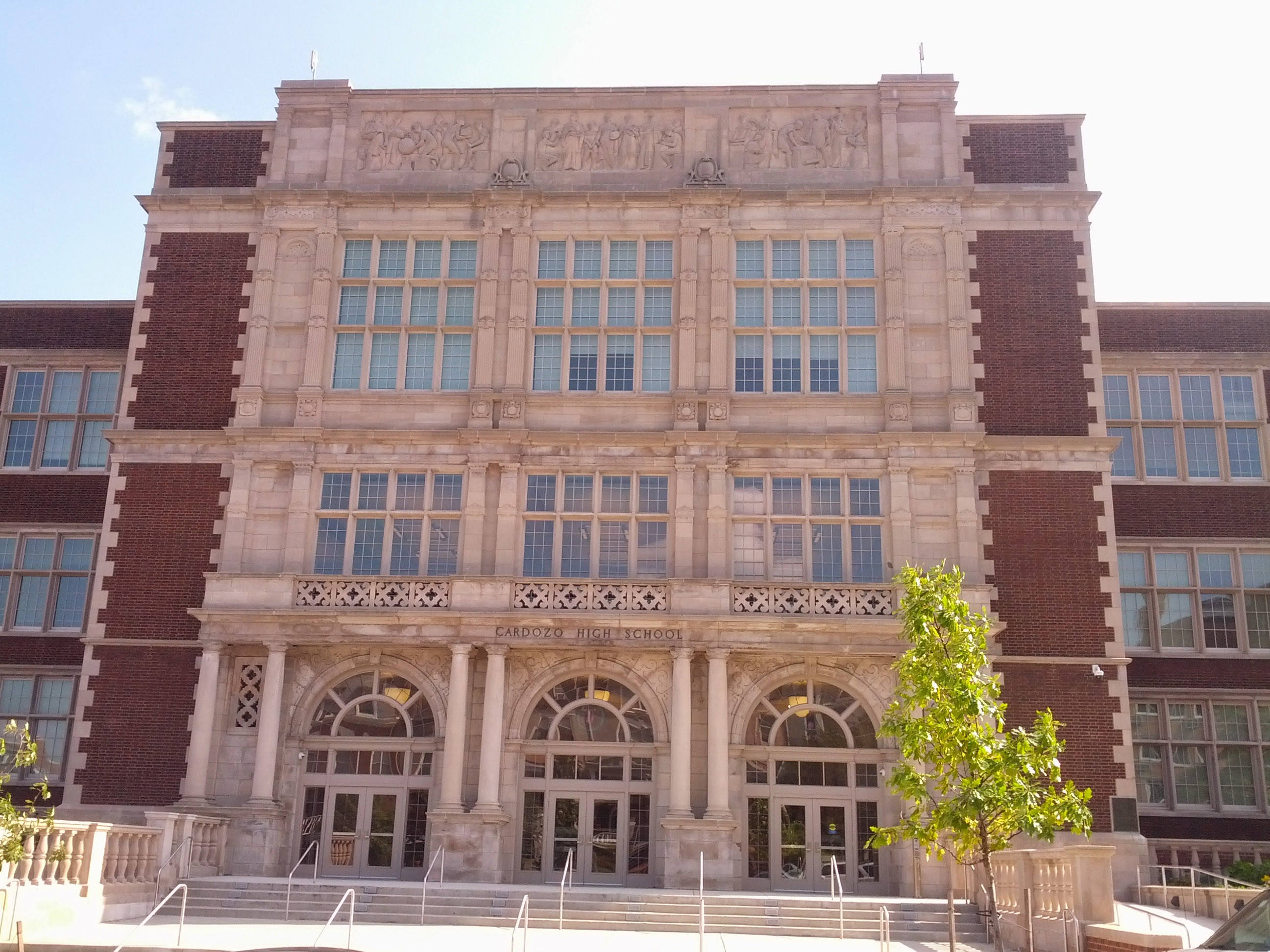
Gaye attended Cardozo High School in Columbia Heights, Washington D.C.

Gaye started singing in church when he was 4 years old; his father often accompanied him on piano. Gaye and his family were raised as Seventh-day Adventists and were part of a conservative church known as the House of God that took its teachings from Pentecostalism, with a strict code of conduct. Gaye developed a love of singing at an early age and was encouraged to pursue a professional music career after a performance at a school play at age 11 when he sang Mario Lanza's "Be My Love".

His home life consisted of "brutal whippings" by his father, who struck him for any shortcoming. The young Gaye described living in his father's house as similar to "living with a king, a very peculiar, changeable, cruel, and all powerful king". He felt that had his mother not consoled him and encouraged his singing, he would have committed suicide. His sister later explained that Gaye was beaten often, from age seven well into his teenage years.

Gaye attended Syphax Elementary School and then Randall Junior High School. Gaye began to take singing much more seriously in junior high, and he joined and became a singing star with the Randall Junior High Glee Club.

In 1953 or 1954, (Note: At least once source claims they did not move in until 1955.) the Gays moved into the East Capitol Dwellings public housing project in D.C.'s Capitol View neighborhood. (Note: MacKenzie and a wide range of sources mischaracterize this neighborhood as Deanwood.) Their townhouse apartment (Unit 12, 60th Street NE, now demolished) was Marvin's home until 1962. (Note: Some sources suggest the family first moved to the Benning Ridge neighborhood after leaving Southwest. According to Zeola Gay and The Washington Post reporter Roger Catlin, the Gay family moved to the Benning Terrace public housing project in the early 1950s. This is not possible, as the Benning Terrace apartments did not begin construction until late 1956, a full year after Marvin Gaye had left home for the military.)

Gaye briefly attended Spingarn High School before transferring to Cardozo High School. At Cardozo, Gaye joined several doo-wop vocal groups, including the Dippers and the D.C. Tones. During his teenage years, his father often kicked him out of the house. In 1956, 17-year-old Gaye dropped out of high school and enlisted in the United States Air Force. He, like many of his peers, quickly became disenchanted with the service, which set them to menial labor instead of working on jet airplanes. Gaye later said he lost his virginity to a local prostitute while in the Air Force. He feigned mental illness and was given a general discharge; in his outgoing performance review, his sergeant wrote, "Airman Gay cannot adjust to regimentation nor authority".

== Career ==
=== Early career ===
After Gaye left the Air Force, he formed a vocal quartet, the Marquees, with his good friend Reese Palmer. The group performed in the D.C. area and soon began working with Bo Diddley, who tried to persuade his own label, Chess, to sign them to a record deal. Failing that, he sent them to Columbia subsidiary OKeh Records. Diddley co-wrote the group's sole single, "Wyatt Earp"; it failed to chart and the group was soon dropped from the label. Gaye began composing music.

Moonglows co-founder Harvey Fuqua later hired the Marquees as employees. Under Fuqua's direction, the group changed its name to Harvey and the New Moonglows, and moved to Chicago. The group recorded several sides for Chess in 1959, including the song "Mama Loocie", which was Gaye's first lead vocal recording. The group found work as session singers for established acts such as Chuck Berry, singing on the songs "Back in the U.S.A." and "Almost Grown". In 1960, the group disbanded. Gaye moved to Detroit with Fuqua, where he signed with Tri-Phi Records as a session musician, playing drums on several Tri-Phi releases. Soon, Fuqua got in touch with Motown president Berry Gordy and offered Gaye to Gordy to sign with the label's Tamla subsidiary selling half of his interest in Gaye. Marvin reportedly signed on September 19, 1960.

Gaye initially pursued a career in jazz standards, rather than in R&B or rock and roll. In May 1961, Tamla issued Marvin's first single, a rendition of "The Masquerade Is Over" under his original surname of "Gay". The single was a limited release and shortly afterwards, Marvin added an "e" to his last name. His first official single under his new name was the Gordy-penned blues ballad, "Let Your Conscience Be Your Guide", in May 1961, with the album The Soulful Moods of Marvin Gaye, following a month later. Gaye's initial recordings failed commercially and he spent most of 1961 performing session work as a drummer for artists such as the Miracles, the Marvelettes and blues artist Jimmy Reed for $5 (US$54 in 2025) a week. While Gaye took some advice on performing with his eyes open (having been accused of appearing as though he were sleeping) and also got pointers on how to move more gracefully onstage, he refused to attend grooming school courses at the John Robert Powers School for Social Grace in Detroit because of his unwillingness to comply with its orders, something he later regretted.

=== Early success ===
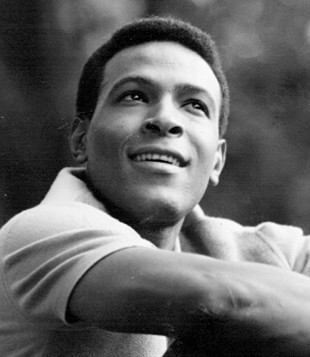
Gaye in 1966

In 1962, Gaye found success as co-songwriter of the Marvelettes track "Beechwood 4-5789", on which he also played drums. His first solo hit, "Stubborn Kind of Fellow", was later released that September, reaching No. 8 on the R&B chart and No. 46 on the Billboard Hot 100 in November and December 1962 respectively. Around the time of the song's release, Gaye joined the first Motortown Revue; he was filmed along with other Motown acts later that December at the Apollo Theater. In March 1963, Gaye first hit the Billboard pop top 40 with the dance song, "Hitch Hike". "Pride and Joy" was Gaye's first top ten single on the Billboard Hot 100 on July 20, 1963. Gaye's first chart album was with Mary Wells on their 1964 collaborative album, Together, reaching No. 42 on the Billboard 200 and featured the double-A sided single "Once Upon a Time" / "What's the Matter with You Baby". Both sides reached the top 20 of the Billboard Hot 100 and increased Gaye's popularity.

Most of Gaye's hit recordings during this period were of interpretations of songs given to him by the label's staff writers, the first of which were the team of Holland-Dozier-Holland, with whom he scored the hits "Can I Get a Witness" and "How Sweet It Is (to Be Loved by You)", which peaked at number six on the Billboard Hot 100 in January 1965. Later in the year, Gaye released the hit singles "I'll Be Doggone" and "Ain't That Peculiar", written for him by Smokey Robinson; both songs reached the Billboard Hot 100 top ten and became his first two number one singles on Hot R&B Singles chart, each selling a million copies.

In 1966, during a chart lull where he failed to score a follow-up solo top ten single, Gaye returned to duet work with Kim Weston, scoring a top 20 hit with "It Takes Two". Gaye's aspirations of being a pop crooner continued with the release of albums such as When I'm Alone I Cry, Hello Broadway and A Tribute to the Great Nat King Cole — all of which were released to little fanfare. A live album, recorded at the Copacabana, set for a 1967 release, was shelved due to Gaye and Gordy fighting over control of the project.

=== Success with Tammi Terrell and I Heard It Through the Grapevine ===
In 1967, Gaye began collaborating with Tammi Terrell on a series of hit singles such as "Ain't No Mountain High Enough", "Your Precious Love", "Ain't Nothing Like the Real Thing" and "You're All I Need to Get By", the latter three reaching the top ten of the pop charts. Gaye won his first Grammy Award nomination in the Best Rhythm & Blues Group Performance, Vocal or Instrumental category for "Ain't No Mountain High Enough". On October 14, 1967, Terrell collapsed in Gaye's arms during a performance at Hampden–Sydney College in Farmville, Virginia. Terrell was rushed to Farmville's Southside Community Hospital, where doctors discovered a malignant tumor in her brain.

The diagnosis ended Terrell's career as a live performer, though she continued to record music under careful supervision; Terrell's tumor would be operated on seven times. Gaye was reportedly devastated by Tammi's sickness and became disillusioned with the record business. On October 6, 1968, Gaye sang the U.S. national anthem live for the first time during Game 4 of the 1968 World Series, held at Tiger Stadium, in Detroit, Michigan, between the Detroit Tigers and the St. Louis Cardinals.

In December 1968, Gaye's recording of "I Heard It Through the Grapevine" became his first to reach No. 1 on the Billboard Hot 100, where it stayed for seven consecutive weeks. His biggest international hit, it would sell more than four million copies and later win Gaye a Grammy Award nomination for Best Male R&B Vocal Performance, losing to Otis Redding for his hit "(Sittin' On) the Dock of the Bay". Due to his depressive mood brought on by Terrell's illness, Gaye felt the success was something he "didn't deserve" and that he "felt like a puppet – Berry's puppet, Anna's puppet". Gaye followed it up with "Too Busy Thinking About My Baby" and "That's the Way Love Is", both of which reached the top ten on the Billboard Hot 100 in 1969. That year, his album M.P.G. became his first No. 1 album on the R&B album charts. During this period, Gaye produced and co-wrote "Baby I'm For Real" and "The Bells" for the Originals.

Tammi Terrell died from brain cancer on March 16, 1970; Gaye attended her funeral. After a period of depression, Gaye sought out a position on the professional football team, the Detroit Lions, where he later befriended Mel Farr and Lem Barney. The Lions played along for the publicity, but ultimately declined an invitation for Gaye to try out, owing to legal liabilities and fears of possible injuries that could have affected his music career.

=== What's Going On ===
On June 1, 1970, Gaye returned to Hitsville U.S.A., where he recorded his new composition "What's Going On", inspired by an idea from Renaldo "Obie" Benson of the Four Tops after he witnessed an act of police brutality at an anti-war rally in Berkeley. Upon hearing the song, Berry Gordy refused its release due to his feelings of the song being "too political" for radio and feared Gaye would lose his crossover audience. Gaye responded by deciding against releasing any other new material before the label released it. Released in January 1971, it reached No. 1 on the R&B charts within a month, staying there for five weeks. It also reached the top spot on Cashbox's pop chart for a week and reached No. 2 on the Hot 100 and the Record World chart, selling more than two million copies. Mel Farr and Lem Barney participated in singing harmony vocals on the song and would later receive gold records for their participation in Gaye's project.

After giving an ultimatum to record a full album to win creative control from Motown, Gaye spent ten days recording the What's Going On album that March. Motown issued the album that May after Gaye remixed the album in Hollywood. The album became Gaye's first million-selling album launching two more top ten singles, "Mercy Mercy Me (The Ecology)" and "Inner City Blues". One of Motown's first autonomous works, its theme and segue flow brought the concept album format to rhythm and blues and soul music. An AllMusic writer later cited it as "the most important and passionate record to come out of soul music, delivered by one of its finest voices". For the album, Gaye received a Grammy Award nomination at the 1972 ceremony and several NAACP Image Awards. The album also topped Rolling Stone's year-end list as its album of the year. Billboard magazine named Gaye "Trendsetter of the Year" following the album's success.

In 1971, Gaye signed a new deal with Motown worth $1 million (US$7,949,877 in 2025), making it the most lucrative deal by a black recording artist at the time. Following the deal, Gaye began recording a similar follow-up album, You're the Man. The title track was only a modest hit upon release, only reaching No. 50 on the Billboard Hot 100 and No. 7 on the Hot Soul Singles chart, the failure of the song led Gaye to shelve the project, which wouldn't be released until 2019. Not too long afterwards, Gaye relocated to Los Angeles and agreed to produce the soundtrack and subsequent score to the blaxploitation criminal thriller, "Trouble Man", which was released in November 1972. The title track became Gaye's fifteenth top ten hit on the Billboard Hot 100, peaking at No. 7 in February 1973.

=== Let's Get It On and later recordings ===
In August 1973, Gaye released the Let's Get It On album. Its title track became Gaye's second No. 1 single on the Hot 100 in September 1973. The album was later hailed as "a record unparalleled in its sheer sensuality and carnal energy". Other singles from the album included "Come Get to This" and the suggestive "You Sure Love to Ball".

In the 1970s, Gaye's sister-in-law turned her attention to Frankie Beverly, the founder of Maze. Gaye took them on his tours, featured them as the opening acts of his concerts, and persuaded Beverly to change the band's name from Raw Soul to Maze.

Gaye's final duet project, Diana & Marvin, with Diana Ross, garnered international success despite contrasting artistic styles. Much of the material was crafted especially for the duo by Ashford and Simpson. Responding to demand from fans and Motown, Gaye started his first concert tour in four years at the Oakland–Alameda County Coliseum on January 4, 1974. The performance received critical acclaim and resulted in the release of the live album, Marvin Gaye Live! and its single, a live version of "Distant Lover", an album track from Let's Get It On, reached the Billboard charts, peaking at No. 12 on the soul chart later that November.

The tour helped to enhance Gaye's reputation as a live performer. For a time, he was earning $100,000 a night (US$652,834 in 2025 dollars) for performances. A renewed contract with Motown allowed Gaye to build his own custom-made recording studio. In October 1975, Gaye gave a performance at a UNESCO benefit concert at New York's Radio City Music Hall to support UNESCO's African literacy drive, resulting in him being commended at the United Nations by then-Ambassador to Ghana Shirley Temple Black and Kurt Waldheim.

Gaye's next studio album, I Want You, followed in March 1976 with the title track "I Want You" reaching No. 1 on the R&B charts. The album would go on to sell over one million copies. That fall, Gaye embarked on his first European concert tour, starting off at the Royal Albert Hall in London. In early 1977, Gaye released the live album, Live at the London Palladium, which sold over two million copies and included the studio song, "Got to Give It Up", which peaked at number one on the Billboard Hot 100. In September 1977, Gaye opened Radio City Music Hall's New York Pop Arts Festival.

In December 1978, Gaye released Here, My Dear, inspired by the fallout from his first marriage to Anna Gordy. Recorded with the intention of remitting a portion of its royalties to her as alimony payments, it performed poorly on the charts and was poorly received. During that period, Gaye's cocaine addiction intensified while he was dealing with several financial issues with the IRS. These issues led him to move to Maui, where he struggled to record a disco-influenced album titled Love Man, with a probable release date for February 1980, though he would shelve the project. That year, Gaye went on a European tour, his first in four years. By the time the tour stopped, he had relocated to London when he feared imprisonment for failure to pay back taxes, which had now reached upwards of $4.5 million (US$17,583,805 in 2025).

Gaye then reworked Love Man from its original disco concept to another socially-conscious album invoking religion and the possible end time from a chapter in the Book of Revelation. Titling the album In Our Lifetime?, Gaye worked on the album for much of 1980 in London studios such as AIR and Odyssey Studios.

In the fall of that year, a master tape of a rough draft of the album was stolen from one of Gaye's traveling musicians, Frank Blair, and taken to Motown's Hollywood headquarters. Motown remixed the album and released it on January 15, 1981. When Gaye learned of its release, he accused Motown of editing and remixing the album without his consent, allowing the release of an unfinished production ("Far Cry"), altering the cover art and removing the album title's question mark, muting its irony. He also accused the label of rush-releasing the album, comparing his unfinished album to an unfinished Pablo Picasso painting. Gaye then vowed not to record any more music for Motown.

=== Midnight Love ===
"Sexual Healing"
"Sexual Healing" was written by Gaye alongside Odell Brown and David Ritz. Ritz said Gaye advised him to write a poem after telling the singer he needed "sexual healing" while living in Europe. The song became an international hit after its release in 1982.

On February 15, 1981, under the advice of music promoter Freddy Cousaert, Gaye relocated to Cousaert's apartment in Ostend, Belgium. While there, Gaye shied away from heavy drug use and began exercising and attending a local Ostend church, regaining personal confidence. In this period, Gaye lived in the home of Belgian musician Charles Dumolin. In March 2024, it was revealed that when he moved on, Gaye had given the family a large collection of unreleased recordings made during his stay in the country.

From June to July 1981, Gaye launched the Heavy Love Affair Tour, named after his final Motown single of the same name, mostly in the United Kingdom before ending it in Ostend. Gaye's personal attorney Curtis Shaw would later describe Gaye's Ostend period as "the best thing that ever happened to Marvin". CBS Urban president Larkin Arnold convinced Gaye to sign with CBS Records after learning of Gaye's plans to leave his longtime label. On March 23, 1982, Motown and CBS negotiated Gaye's release from Motown. The details of the contract were not revealed due to a possible negative effect on Gaye's settlement to creditors from the IRS and to stop a possible bidding war by competing labels.

Assigned to CBS's Columbia subsidiary, Gaye worked on his first post-Motown album titled Midnight Love in Belgium and Germany. The first single from the album, "Sexual Healing", which was composed at Ostend in Freddy Cousaert's apartment and later recorded in Ohain, was released in November 1982, and became the biggest-selling single in Gaye's career, spending ten weeks at No. 1 on the Hot Black Singles chart. The single took just four weeks to rise up the charts, the fastest on the R&B charts since 1977.

The song became Gaye's eighteenth and final top 10 single on the Billboard Hot 100, where it peaked at No. 3 in January 1983, while reaching the top ten in several international markets including the UK, Australia and Belgium and topping the charts in Canada and New Zealand. It would sell more than two million copies in the U.S. alone, becoming Gaye's most successful single to date. The video for the song was shot at Ostend's Casino-Kursaal.

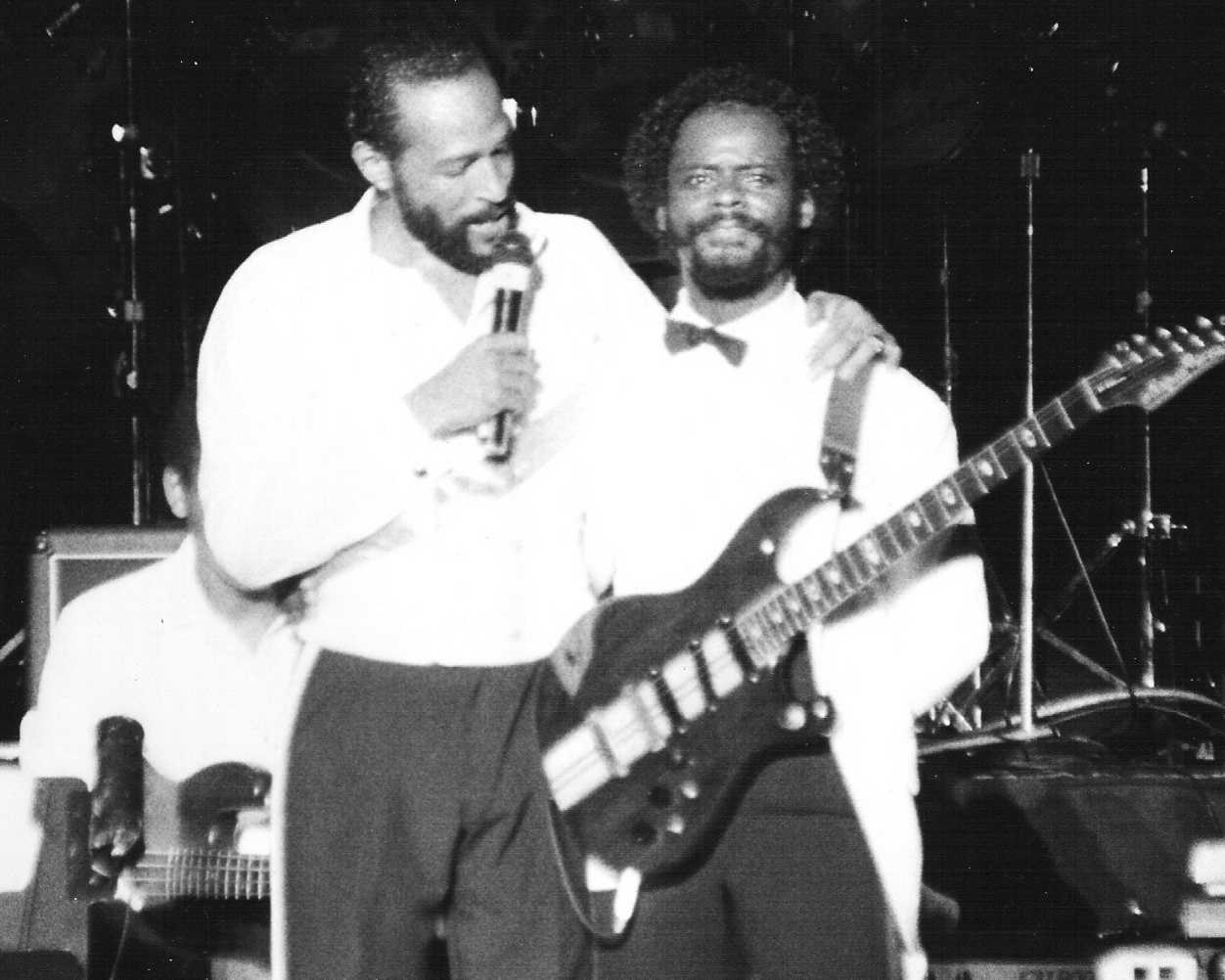
Gaye with Gordon Banks, his guitarist and brother-in-law, during the Sexual Healing Tour in 1983.

"Sexual Healing" won Gaye his first two Grammy Awards including Best Male R&B Vocal Performance, in February 1983, and also won Gaye an American Music Award in the R&B category. People magazine called it "America's hottest musical turn-on since Olivia Newton-John demanded we get 'Physical'". On its year-end chart, Billboard ranked "Sexual Healing" the top ranked R&B song of 1983, resulting in Gaye winning a Billboard Number-One Award. Midnight Love was released to stores less than a week after the single's release, and was equally successful, peaking at the top 10 of the Billboard 200 and becoming Gaye's seventh No. 1 album on the Top Black Albums chart, and was his first album in his career to be certified, going platinum in December 1982. (Note: Throughout his career in Motown, the label wasn't a member of the Recording Industry Association of America until 1978. Therefore a lot of Gaye's best-selling work at the label wouldn't get certified until the advent of CDs in the 1990s.) Sales eventually reach three million units, going triple-platinum posthumously in 2000, becoming his most successful album to date. The album's subsequent singles "'Til Tomorrow" and "Joy" failed to chart on the Hot 100 while only receiving moderate success on the R&B charts, while "My Love is Waiting" peaked at number 34 on the UK singles chart. These singles would be his final songs to chart prior to his death.

I don't make records for pleasure. I did when I was a younger artist, but I don't today. I record so that I can feed people what they need, what they feel. Hopefully, I record so that I can help someone overcome a bad time.

— NME, December 1982

On February 13, 1983, Gaye sang "The Star-Spangled Banner" at the NBA All-Star Game at The Forum in Inglewood, California — accompanied by Gordon Banks, who played the studio tape from the stands. It has since been regarded as one of the greatest performances of the national anthem in its history. Ten days later, on February 23, Gaye performed "Sexual Healing" at the 25th Annual Grammy Awards and later won his Grammy shortly after the performance, presented to him by Rick James and Grace Jones. Gaye's final television performance occurred at the Motown 25: Yesterday, Today, Forever TV special on May 16, 1983, where, after playing the piano and delivering a speech on the history of black music, including Motown itself, he performed "What's Going On".

Gaye embarked on his final concert tour in North America, titled the Sexual Healing Tour, on April 18, 1983, at Humphreys by the Bay in San Diego. The 51-date tour included 50 dates in the United States and one date in Canada. Earlier shows were received well, including several dates at the Circle Star Theater in San Carlos, California. Gaye broke Barry Manilow's then-record of five sold-out shows at Radio City Music Hall with six. By then, however, due to cocaine and PCP-triggered paranoia, increasing vocal issues and illness, the tour struggled to perform well and midway through as Gaye finished the tour in the Pacific Southwest, the tour began suffering from ticket losses before ending on August 14, 1983, at the Pacific Amphitheatre in Costa Mesa, California. In February 1984, Midnight Love was nominated for a Grammy Award in the Best Male R&B Vocal Performance category, his 12th and final nomination.

== Personal life ==
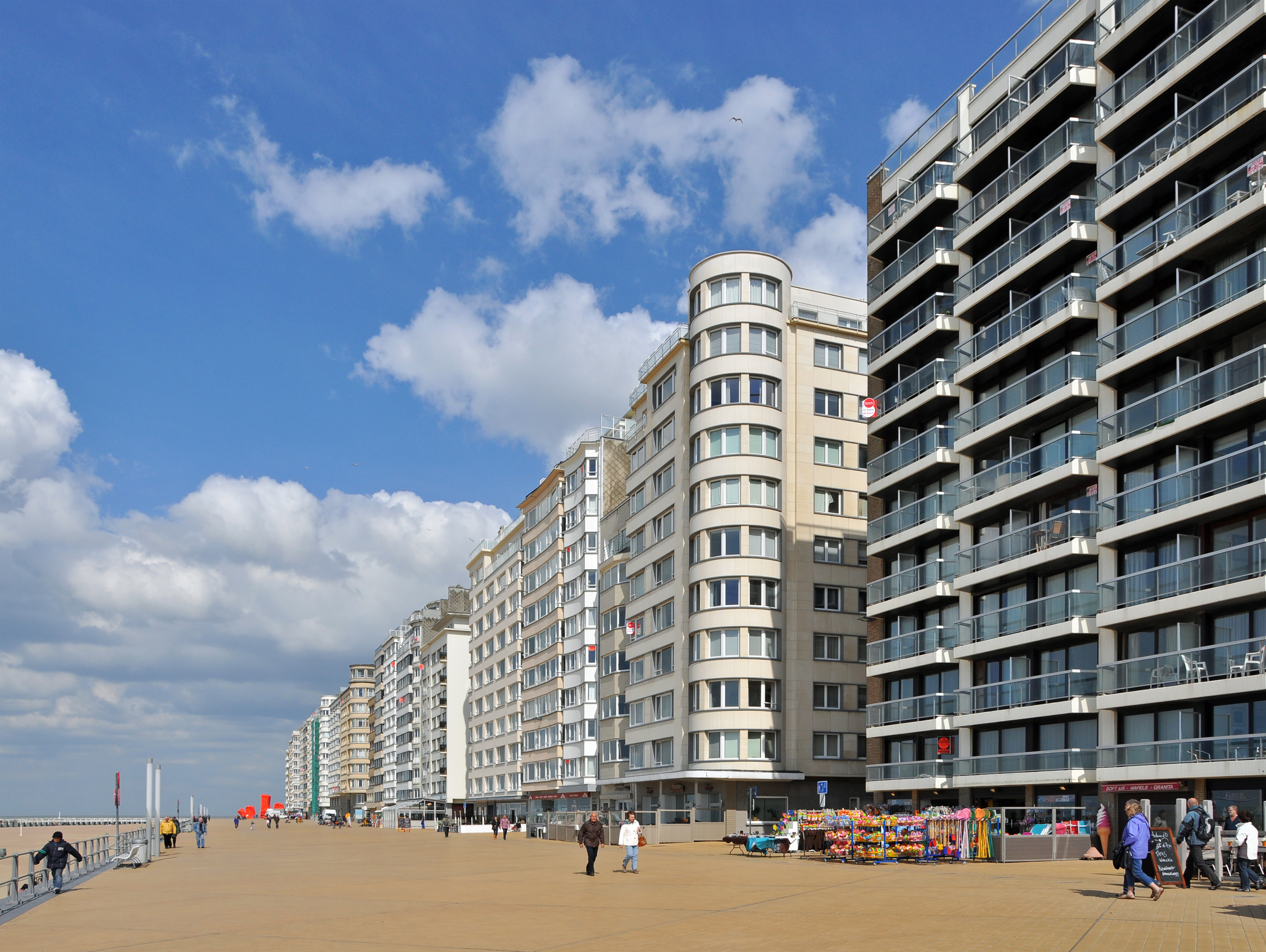
Gaye lived in a rented apartment at the Albert-I Promenade in Ostend, Belgium, during his early 1980s exile.

Gaye married twice. In June 1963, Gaye married Anna Gordy, sister of Berry Gordy. The couple's contentious marriage ended in 1977 after a two-year divorce trial. That year, Gaye married Janis Hunter, daughter of Slim Gaillard, after a four-year courtship. They separated in 1979 and officially divorced in 1982.

Gaye was the father of three: Marvin III (by adoption), Nona, and Frankie. Marvin III was the biological son of Anna's niece, Denise Gordy, who was 16 at the time of Marvin III's birth. Nona and Frankie were born to Gaye's second wife, Janis. Gaye was a cousin of Wu-Tang Clan member Masta Killa.

In 2018, producer Quincy Jones claimed Gaye had been sexually involved with actor Marlon Brando, an allegation denied by Gaye's surviving family. Gaye's sister Zeola called Jones "wicked and vindictive" following the allegations, while Gaye's eldest son Marvin III stated that his father "didn't have anything against homosexuals" and that Gaye was a "ladies' man". Jones later apologized for his comments, calling it "word vomit".

During his lifetime, Gaye owned several homes. From 1967 to 1972, Gaye and his family lived in a comfortable house near Detroit's Outer Drive; the home was once owned by Berry Gordy. Gaye and his family moved to Los Angeles in September 1972, settling at a home in the Hollywood Hills. After separating from his first wife, he bought a one-bedroom apartment in Culver City, California where he lived for over a year. In late 1973, he and then live-in girlfriend Janis resettled in a home in Topanga, California to get away from the busy Hollywood nightlife and Motown's demands. After a robbery occurred there, they moved to a mansion in Hidden Hills in 1975. That same year, he moved his parents to a home he bought specifically for them at the West Adams district of Los Angeles.

After purchasing what became Marvin's Room in West Hollywood, Gaye made the building into his own recording studio, apartment complex, and nightclub. There, he made many of his late Motown-era recordings before the building was put on foreclosure following the singer filing for bankruptcy in October 1978.

During his prolonged stay in Ostend, Gaye lived at a seafront apartment at Residence Jane on the Albert-I Promenade 77 where he wrote "Sexual Healing". By 1982, he had moved to a 21-room villa just outside Ostend before returning to the United States. In 1983, Gaye rented a mansion in Sherman Oaks, but due to his increasing debt and drug issues, he soon returned to his parents' property in West Adams, Los Angeles.

== Death and funeral ==
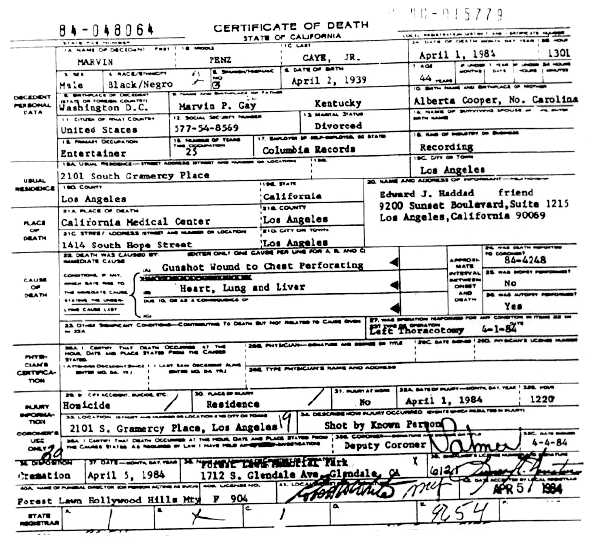
Gaye's Certificate of Death

In late 1983, Gaye convinced his bodyguard on his final concert tour, Andre White, to give his father Marvin Gay Sr. a .38 Special handgun, due to the singer's fears of being targeted. In the months leading up to his death, Gaye and his father struggled with keeping themselves apart from each other at the family house in the West Adams neighborhood of Western Heights in Los Angeles due to constant conflict. At the same time, Gaye was dealing with a crippling drug addiction and depression. On March 31, 1984, an argument occurred between Gaye's parents at the property, leading Gaye to intervene and defend his mother. That night, no further conflict arose.

In the early afternoon hours of April 1, 1984, Gaye once again intervened in another argument between his parents. When his father refused to leave his room despite his orders, Gaye attacked his father, who shot Gaye twice, once in the chest, piercing his heart, and then into his shoulder. The shooting took place in Gaye's bedroom at 12:38 p.m. Gaye was pronounced dead at 1:01 p.m. after his body arrived at California Hospital Medical Center. He would have turned 45 the following day.

On April 5, 1984, more than 10,000 mourners lined up to pay respects to the singer at Forest Lawn Memorial Park, Glendale, which was then followed by a private funeral that was attended by over 500, including former Motown colleagues such as Smokey Robinson and Stevie Wonder along with comedian and friend Dick Gregory. Wonder performed the ballad "Lighting Up the Candles", which he wrote for the occasion. The song was later placed as the final song on Wonder's 1991 soundtrack for the film Jungle Fever.

After Gaye's funeral, his body was cremated at Forest Lawn Memorial Park–Hollywood Hills, and his ashes were scattered into the Pacific Ocean. Gay Sr. was initially charged with first-degree murder, but the charges were reduced to voluntary manslaughter following a diagnosis of a brain tumor. He was given a suspended six-year sentence and probation. He died at a nursing home in 1998.

== Artistry ==
=== Instruments ===
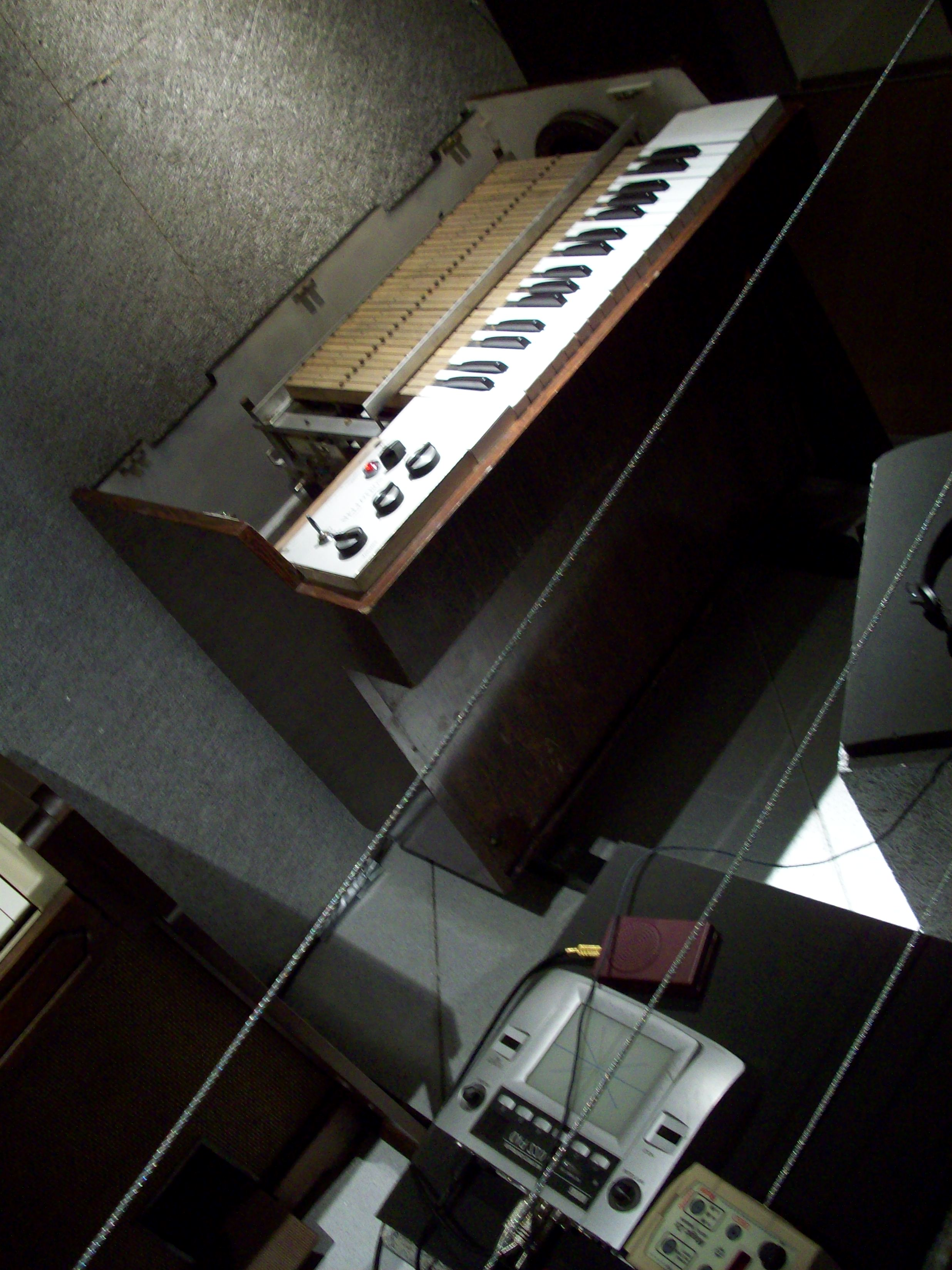
Gaye used the mellotron at the end of his 1971 hit, "Mercy Mercy Me (The Ecology)".

During his early career, Gaye played drums on several recordings, first for Harvey Fuqua's Tri-Phi label and then shortly after joining Tamla Records. Among his significant contributions as a drummer include the songs "That's What Girls Are Made For" by the Spinners, "Beechwood 4-5789" by the Marvelettes, the studio and live recordings of "Fingertips" by Stevie Wonder, and "Dancing in the Street" by Martha and the Vandellas.

During a tour by the Miracles in 1961, Gaye joined them on the road as their drummer. In addition to the drums, Gaye also used percussion instruments such as bells, finger cymbals, box drums, glockenspiels, vibraphones, bongos, congas, and cabasas. For his 1971 hit "What's Going On", Gaye used a Cajón, or "box drum" to accentuate the drumming of Chet Forest on the song as well as the percussive work by Eddie "Bongo" Brown.

Over time, Gaye relied less on drums and more on piano and various keyboard instruments as he began producing his own music in the 1970s. By the release of What's Going On, Gaye had begun using synthesizers and music programming machines. Gaye notably used the mellotron, a keyboard instrument, at the end of "Mercy Mercy Me (The Ecology)", a hit from his What's Going On album.

Gaye began using synthesizers more prominently starting with the soundtrack to Trouble Man and subsequent albums such as Let's Get It On, I Want You, and Here, My Dear.

During the making of the Midnight Love album in 1982, Gaye was using the TR-808, a drum machine that became prominent in the early '80s. The synthesized electro-funk sound led to several R&B and hip-hop artists to use the machine for their own music.

=== Influences ===
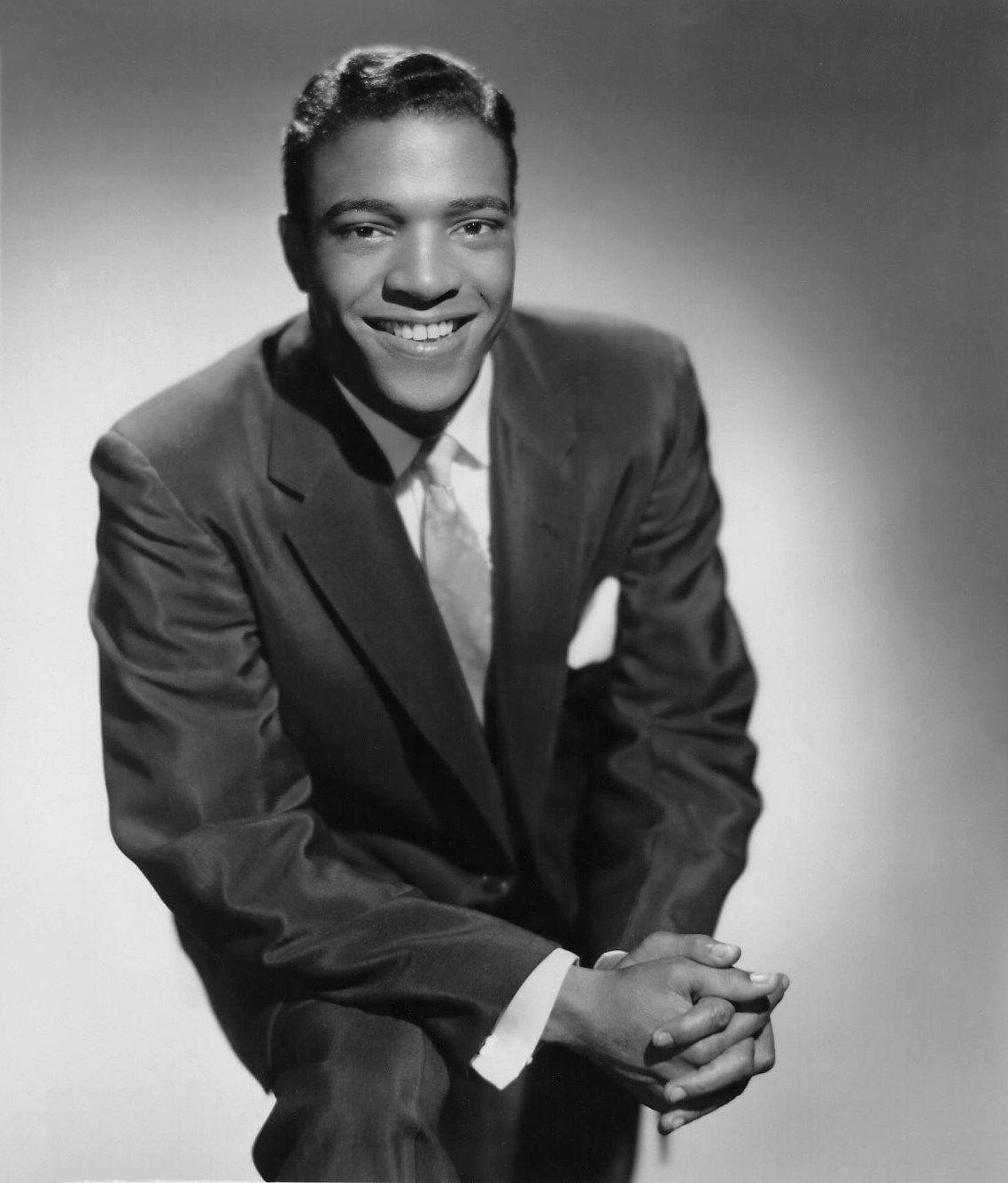
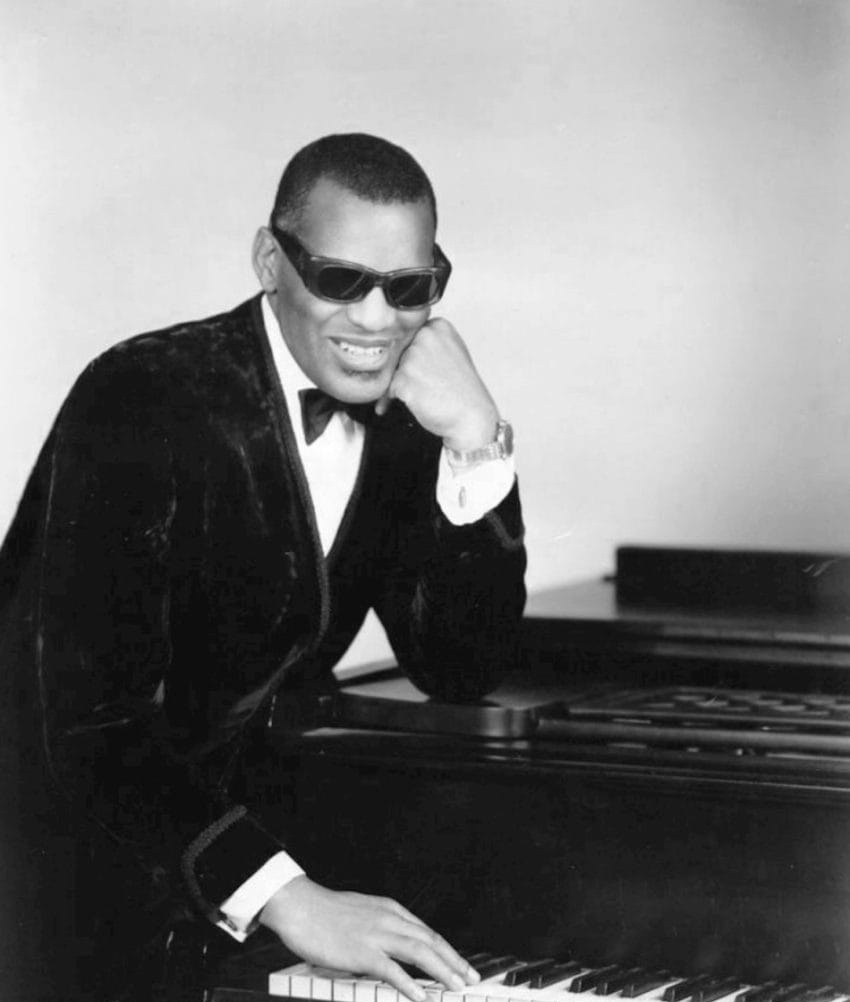
Clyde McPhatter (left) and Ray Charles (right) were among Marvin Gaye's major musical influences growing up.

As a child, Gaye's main influence was his minister father, mentioning that his father's sermons greatly impressed him. His early musical influence as a child was gospel singer Mahalia Jackson.

His first major musical influences outside of gospel music were doo-wop groups such as The Moonglows and The Capris. Gaye's Rock & Roll Hall of Fame page lists the Capris' song, "God Only Knows" as "critical to his musical awakening". Of the Capris' song, Gaye said, "It fell from the heavens and hit me between the eyes. So much soul, so much hurt. I related to the story, to the way that no one except the Lord really can read the heart of lonely kids in love."

Gaye's main musical influences were Rudy West of The Five Keys, Clyde McPhatter, Ray Charles, and Little Willie John. Gaye considered Frank Sinatra a major influence in what he wanted to be. He also was influenced by the vocal styles of Billy Eckstine and Nat King Cole.

In addition, Gaye was also inspired by Billie Holiday and Johnnie Ray, having been discovered singing Ray's hit "Cry" by his classmates.

As his Motown career developed, Gaye took inspiration from fellow label mates such as David Ruffin of The Temptations and Levi Stubbs of the Four Tops, whose grittier voices led to Gaye and his producer to seek a similar sound in recordings such as "I Heard It Through the Grapevine" and "That's the Way Love Is". Later in life, Gaye reflected on the influence of Ruffin and Stubbs, stating: "I had heard something in their voices something my own voice lacked." He further explained: "The Tempts and Tops' music made me remember that when a lot of women listen to music, they want to feel the power of a real man."

=== Vocal style ===
Gaye had a four-octave vocal range. From his earlier recordings as member of the Marquees and Harvey and the New Moonglows, and in his first several recordings with Motown, Gaye recorded mainly in the baritone and tenor ranges. He changed his tone to a rasp for his gospel-inspired early hits such as "Stubborn Kind of Fellow" and "Hitch Hike". As writer Eddie Holland explained, "He was the only singer I have ever heard known to take a song of that nature, that was so far removed from his natural voice where he liked singing, and do whatever it took to sell that song."

In songs such as "Pride and Joy", Gaye used three vocal ranges: his baritone range at the beginning, bringing a lighter tenor in the verses, and reaching a gospel mode in the chorus. Holland said Gaye had "one of the sweetest and prettiest voices you ever wanted to hear". He said that Gaye's "basic soul" was ballads and jazz, but he "had the ability to take a roughhouse, rock and roll, blues, R&B, any kind of song and make it his own". Gaye, he said, was the most versatile vocalist he had ever worked with.

Gaye changed his vocal style in the late 1960s, when he was advised to use a sharper, raspy voice—especially in Norman Whitfield's recordings. Gaye initially disliked the new style, considering it out of his range, but said he was "into being produce-able". After listening to David Ruffin and Levi Stubbs, Gaye said he started to develop what he called his "tough man voice"—saying, "I developed a growl." In the liner notes of his DVD set, Marvin Gaye: The Real Thing in Performance 1964–1981, Rob Bowman said that by the early 1970s, Gaye had developed "three distinct voices: his smooth, sweet tenor; a growling rasp; and an unreal falsetto." Bowman further wrote that the recording of the What's Going On single was "... the first single to use all three as Marvin developed a radical approach to constructing his recordings by layering a series of contrapuntal background vocal lines on different tracks, each one conceived and sung in isolation by Marvin himself." Bowman found that Gaye's multi-tracking of his tenor voice and other vocal styles "summon[ed] up what might be termed the ancient art of weaving".

=== Social commentary and concept albums ===
Before recording the What's Going On album, Gaye recorded a cover of the song "Abraham, Martin & John", which became a UK hit in June 1970. Despite some political music and socially conscious material recorded by The Temptations, Motown artists were often told to not delve into political and social commentary, for fear of alienating pop audiences. Early in his career, Gaye was affected by social events including the 1965 Watts riots and once asked himself: "with the world exploding around me, how am I supposed to keep singing love songs?" When Gaye called Gordy in the Bahamas about wanting to do protest music, Gordy told him: "Marvin, don't be ridiculous. That's taking things too far."

Gaye was inspired by the Black Panther Party and supported the efforts they put forth such as giving free meals to poor families door to door. However, he did not support the violent tactics the Panthers used to fight oppression, as Gaye's messages in many of his political songs were nonviolent. The lyrics and music of What's Going On discuss and illustrate issues during the 1960s/1970s such as racism, police brutality, drug abuse, environmental issues, anti-war, and black power issues. Gaye was inspired to make this album because of events such as the Vietnam War, the 1967 race riots in Detroit, and the Kent State shootings, as well as the assassinations of Martin Luther King Jr. and Robert F. Kennedy.

Once Gaye presented Gordy with the What's Going On album, Gordy feared Gaye was risking the ruination of his image as a sex symbol. Following the album's success, Gaye tried a follow-up album, You're the Man. The title track only produced modest success, however, and Gaye and Motown shelved the album. Several of Gaye's unreleased songs of social commentary, including "The World Is Rated X", would be issued on posthumous compilation albums. What's Going On would later be described by Stephen Thomas Erlewine of AllMusic as an album that "not only redefined soul music as a creative force but also expanded its impact as an agent for social change". You're the Man was finally released on March 29, 2019, through Motown, Universal Music Enterprises, and Universal Music Group.

The What's Going On album also provided another first in both Motown and R&B music: Gaye and his engineers had composed the album in a song cycle, segueing previous songs into other songs giving the album a more cohesive feel as opposed to R&B albums that traditionally included filler tracks to complete the album. This style of music would influence recordings by artists such as Stevie Wonder and Barry White making the concept album format a part of 1970s R&B music. Although Gaye was not politically active outside of his music, he became a public figure for social change and inspired/educated many people through his work.

== Legacy and accolades ==
=== Impact ===
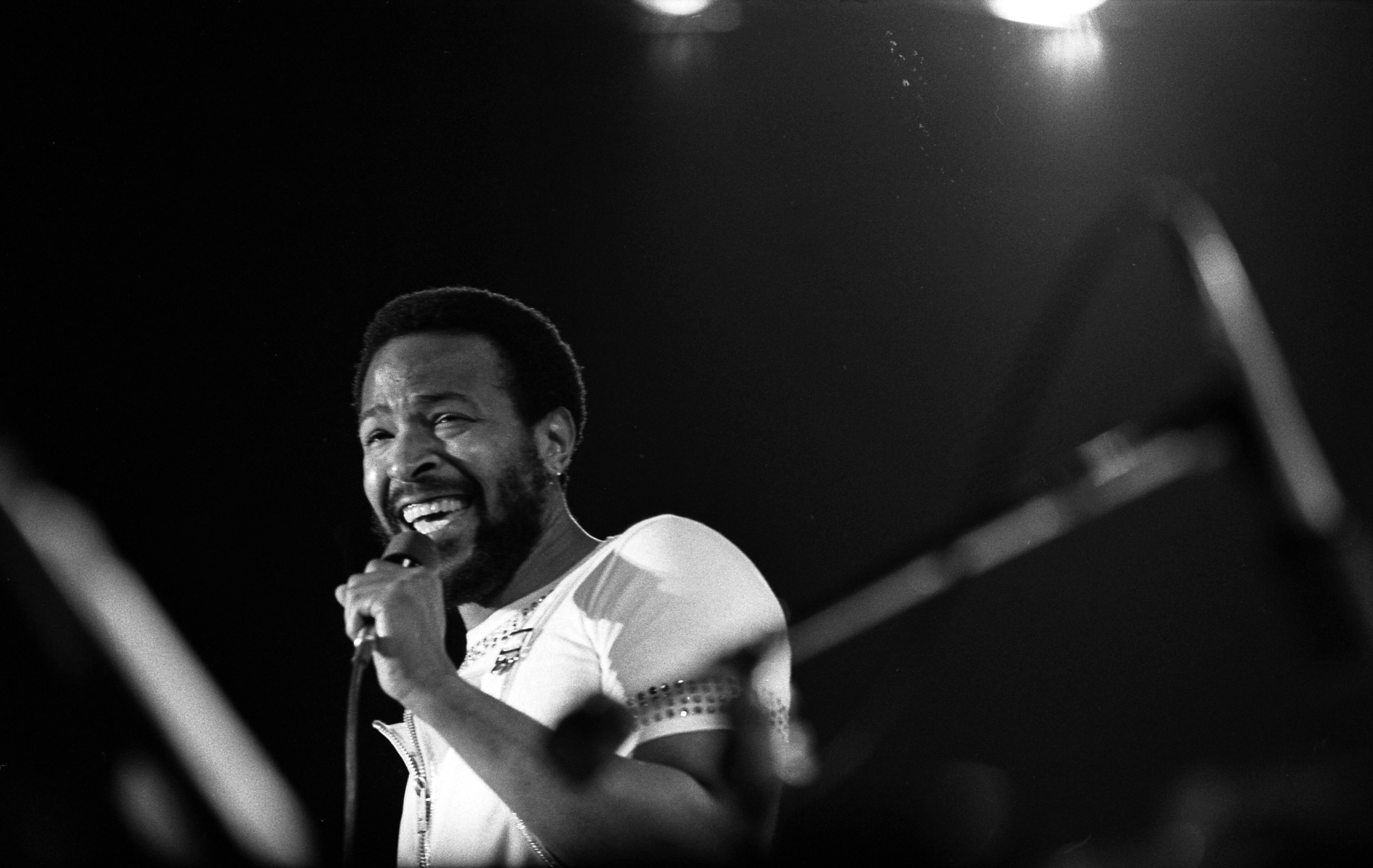
Marvin Gaye performing in 1974.

Gaye has been called "the number-one purveyor of soul music". In his book Mercy Mercy Me: The Art, Loves and Demons of Marvin Gaye, Michael Eric Dyson described Marvin as someone "who transcended the boundaries of rhythm and blues as no other performer had done before". Following his death, The New York Times described Gaye as someone who "blended the soul music of the urban scene with the beat of the old-time gospel singer and became an influential force in pop music". Further in the article, Gaye was also credited with combining "the soulful directness of gospel music, the sweetness of soft-soul and pop, and the vocal musicianship of a jazz singer". His recordings for Motown in the 1960s and 1970s shaped that label's signature sound. His work with Motown gave him the titles Prince of Soul and Prince of Motown.

Critics stated that Gaye's music "signified the development of black music from raw rhythm and blues, through sophisticated soul to the political awareness of the 1970s and increased concentration on personal and sexual politics thereafter". As a Motown artist, Gaye was among the first to break from the reins of its production system, paving the way for Stevie Wonder. Gaye's 1970s recordings influenced forms of R&B predating the subgenres quiet storm and neo-soul while his 1980s recordings influenced contemporary R&B.

Barry White, Stevie Wonder, Frankie Beverly and many others have said they were influenced by Gaye's music. For his Oscar-nominated role as James "Thunder" Ealy in the film Dreamgirls, Eddie Murphy replicated Gaye's 1970s clothing style.

David Ritz wrote in a 1991 revision of Divided Soul his biography of Gaye, "since 1983, Marvin's name has been mentioned—in reverential tones—on no less than seven top-ten hit records". Gaye's name has been used in the title of several hits, including Big Sean's "Marvin Gaye & Chardonnay" and Charlie Puth's debut hit, "Marvin Gaye", a duet with Meghan Trainor. The 1983 Spandau Ballet hit "True" mentions "Listening to Marvin all night long...".

=== Achievements ===
Gaye landed a charting single on both the Billboard Hot 100 and Hot R&B/Hip-Hop Songs charts every year between 1962 and 1974.

One of the most successful charting artists in Billboard history, he recorded 56 charting singles on the Billboard Hot 100, with 41 top 40 entries, 18 top ten singles and three number one singles. On the R&B charts, he recorded over 67 charting singles, 62 top 40 entries, 39 top ten singles and thirteen number one hits recorded between 1965 and 1982.

Seven of Gaye's albums between 1969 and 1982 topped the Top R&B/Hip-Hop Albums chart, while six peaked inside the top ten of the Billboard 200 between 1971 and 1982.

As a songwriter, in addition to his own hits such as "Stubborn Kind of Fellow", "If This World Were Mine", "What's Going On", "Mercy Mercy Me (The Ecology)" and "Let's Get It On", Gaye co-wrote several hit singles for other artists, most notably "Beechwood 4-5789" for the Marvelettes, "Dancing in the Street" by Martha and the Vandellas, "Baby, I'm for Real" and "The Bells" for the Originals during his Motown tenure. Gaye also penned songs for Diana Ross and the Miracles. Gaye is the co-songwriter of Paul Young's number one UK hit cover of his 1962 tune, "Wherever I Lay My Hat (That's My Home)", which topped the UK charts for three weeks in July 1983.

Gaye's 1962 hit composition "Hitch Hike" influenced the Velvet Underground's "There She Goes Again". In addition, some of Gaye's compositions for others and his own composed hit singles have been covered by artists as diverse as Van Halen, Mick Jagger and David Bowie, After 7, Cyndi Lauper, Color Me Badd, Luther Vandross, Kate Bush and Aaliyah.

When three of the singles from the What's Going On album reached the top ten of the Billboard Hot 100, it made Gaye the first male artist to accomplish such a feat. In addition, all three songs topped the R&B charts, marking another chart feat. His 1977 single, "Got to Give It Up", became among one of the first songs to top the pop, R&B and dance charts.

His 1982 hit, "Sexual Healing", became the first R&B single since the chart's 1958 inception to stay atop the charts for ten consecutive weeks, which remained a chart record for over a decade until Whitney Houston's 1992 hit, "I Will Always Love You", broke the record in February 1993.

=== Awards and honors ===
The Rock and Roll Hall of Fame inducted him in 1987, declaring that Gaye "made a huge contribution to soul music in general and the Motown Sound in particular". The page stated that Gaye "possessed a classic R&B voice that was edged with grit yet tempered with sweetness". The page further states that Gaye "projected an air of soulful authority driven by fervid conviction and heartbroken vulnerability". In 1985, then-mayor of D.C., Marion Barry declared April 2 as "Marvin Gaye Jr. Memorial Scholarship Fund Day" in the city. Since then, a non-profit organization has helped to organize annual Marvin Gaye Day Celebrations in the city of Washington.

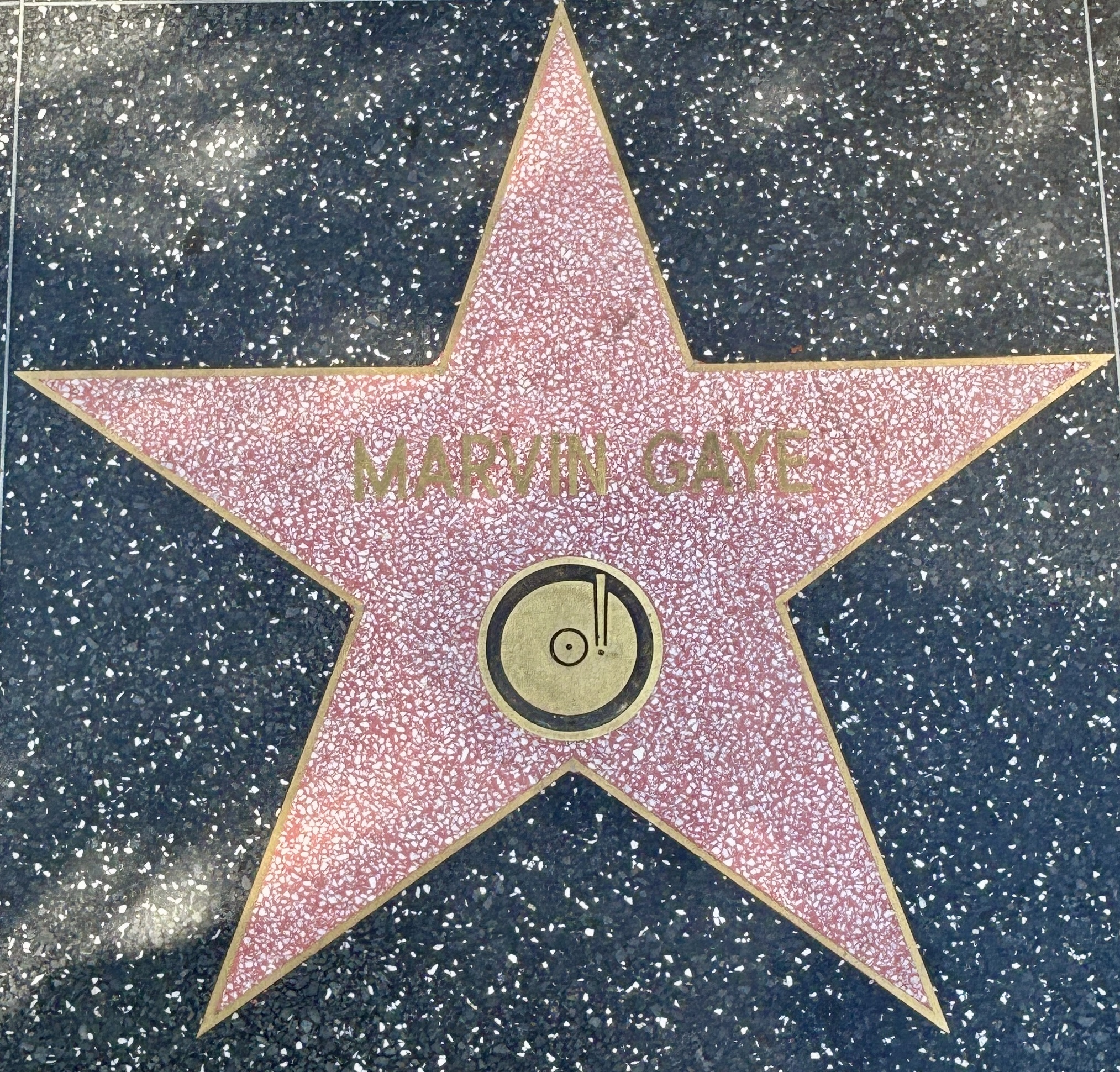
Hollywood Walk of Fame star

In 1986, Gaye's mother founded the Marvin P. Gaye Jr. Memorial Foundation in dedication to her son to help those suffering from drug abuse and alcoholism; however she died a day before the memorial was set to open in 1987. Gaye's sister Jeanne once served as the foundation's chairperson. In 1988, a year after his Rock and Roll Hall of Fame induction, Gaye was inducted posthumously to the NAACP Hall of Fame. In 1990, Gaye received a star on the Hollywood Walk of Fame.

In 1996, Gaye posthumously received the Grammy Lifetime Achievement Award. The Rock and Roll Hall of Fame listed three Gaye recordings, "I Heard It Through the Grapevine", "What's Going On" and "Sexual Healing", among its list of the 500 Songs That Shaped Rock and Roll. American music magazine Rolling Stone ranked Gaye No. 18 on their list of the "100 Greatest Artists of All Time", sixth on their list of "100 Greatest Singers of All Time" and No. 82 on their list of the "100 Greatest Songwriters of All Time". Q magazine ranked Gaye sixth on their list of the "100 Greatest Singers".

Three of Gaye's albums – What's Going On (1971), Let's Get It On (1973), and Here, My Dear (1978) – were ranked by Rolling Stone on their list of the 500 Greatest Albums of All Time. What's Going On remains his largest-ranked album, reaching No. 6 on the Rolling Stone list and topping the NME list of the Top 100 Albums of All Time in 1985; it was later chosen in 2003 for inclusion by the Library of Congress to its National Recording Registry. In a revised 2020 Rolling Stone list of the 500 greatest albums of all time, What's Going On was listed as the greatest album of all time. In addition, four of his songs – "I Heard It Through the Grapevine", "What's Going On", "Let's Get It On" and "Sexual Healing" – made it on the Rolling Stone list of the 500 Greatest Songs of All Time. In 2005, Gaye was voted into the Michigan Rock and Roll Legends Hall of Fame.

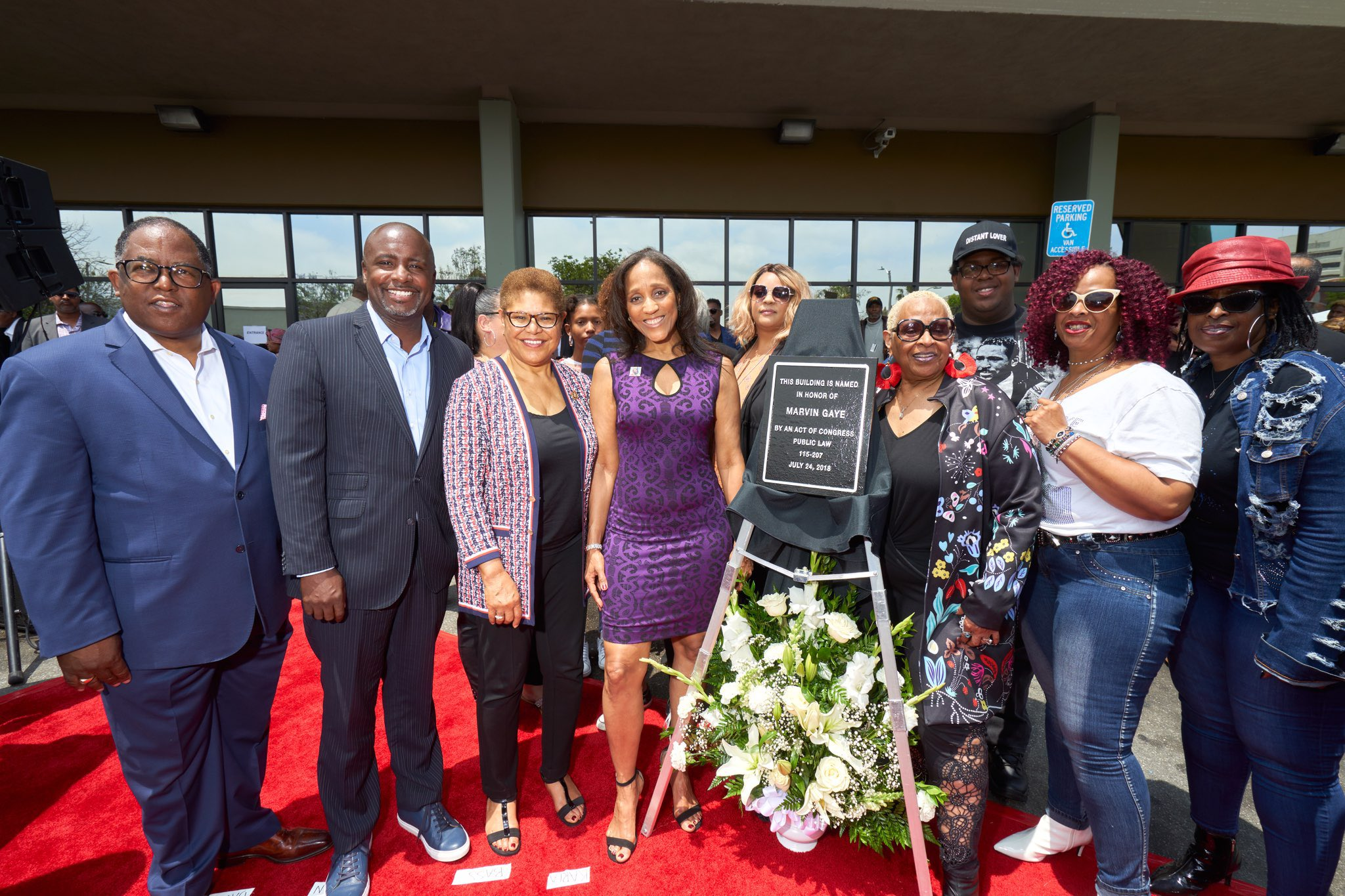
Karen Bass and Gaye's family at the dedication of the Marvin Gaye Post Office in Los Angeles in 2019

In 2006, Watts Branch Park, a park in Washington that Gaye frequented as a teenager, was renamed Marvin Gaye Park. Three years later, the 5200 block of Foote Street NE in Deanwood, Washington, D.C., was renamed Marvin Gaye Way. In August 2014, Gaye was inducted to the official Rhythm and Blues Music Hall of Fame in its second class. In October 2015, the Songwriters Hall of Fame announced Gaye as a nominee for induction to the Hall's 2016 class after posthumous nominations were included. Gaye was named as a posthumous inductee to that hall on March 2, 2016. Gaye was inducted to the Songwriters Hall on June 9, 2016.

In July 2018, a bill by California politician Karen Bass to rename a post office in South Los Angeles after Gaye was signed into law by President Donald Trump. Gaye was ranked No. 20 on Rolling Stone's "The 200 Greatest Singers of All Time" published in January 2023. In June 2025, Billboard ranked Gaye the tenth best R&B artist of all time.

On what would have been Marvin Gaye's 80th birthday, the U.S. Postal Service honored Gaye with the dedication of a new commemorative Forever stamp during a first-day-of-issue ceremony at the Greek Theatre, where he once performed.

=== In popular culture ===
His 1983 NBA All-Star performance of the national anthem was used in a Nike commercial featuring the 2008 U.S. Olympic basketball team. Also, on CBS Sports' final NBA telecast to date (before the contract moved to NBC) at the conclusion of Game 5 of the 1990 Finals, they used Gaye's 1983 All-Star Game performance over the closing credits. When VH1 launched on January 1, 1985, Gaye's 1983 rendition of the national anthem was the first video they aired, immediately followed by Diana Ross' tribute song to Gaye, "Missing You". The 1985 Commodores song "Nightshift" was a tribute to Gaye and Jackie Wilson, who both died in 1984. One verse mentions Gaye's song "What's Going On".

"I Heard It Through the Grapevine" was played in a Levi's television advertisement in 1985. The result of the commercial's success led to the original song finding renewed success in Europe after Tamla-Motown re-released it in the United Kingdom, Germany and the Netherlands. In 1986, the song was covered by Buddy Miles as part of a California Raisins ad campaign. The song was later used for chewing gum commercials in Finland and to promote a brand of Lucky Strike cigarettes in Germany.

Gaye's music has also been used in numerous film soundtracks including Four Brothers and Captain America: The Winter Soldier, both of which featured Gaye's music from his Trouble Man soundtrack. "I Heard It Through the Grapevine" was used in the opening credits of the film, The Big Chill.

In 2007, his song "A Funky Space Reincarnation" was used in the Charlize Theron–starred ad for Dior J'Adore perfume. A documentary about Gaye—What's Going On: The Marvin Gaye Story—was a UK/PBS co-production, directed by Jeremy Marre and was first broadcast in 2006. Two years later, the special re-aired with a different production and newer interviews after it was re-broadcast as an American Masters special. Two documentaries focusing on his 1981–82 stay in Ostend, titled Marvin Gaye Transit Ostende and Remember Marvin Gaye, were released in 1989 and 2001 respectively.

== Earnings ==
In 2008, Gaye's estate earned $3.5 million (US$5,233,771 in 2025 dollars). As a result, Gaye placed 13th in Forbes Magazine's "Top-Earning Dead Celebrities".

On March 11, 2015, Gaye's family was awarded $7.4 million in damages following a decision by an eight-member jury in Los Angeles that Robin Thicke and Pharrell Williams had breached copyright by incorporating part of Gaye's song "Got to Give It Up" into their hit "Blurred Lines"; U.S. District Judge John Kronstadt reduced the sum later that year to $5.3 million, while adding royalties. In January 2016, the Gaye family requested that a California judge award an additional $2.66 million in attorneys' fees and $777,000 in legal expenses.

As of 2026, Gaye's estate was managed by Geffen Management Group and his legacy is protected through Creative Rights Group. Both are founded by talent manager Jeremy Geffen.

== Attempted biopics ==
There have been several attempts to adapt Gaye's life story into a feature film. In February 2006, it was reported that Jesse L. Martin was to portray Gaye in a biopic titled Sexual Healing, named after Gaye's 1982 song of the same name. The film was to have been directed by Lauren Goodman and produced by James Gandolfini and Alexandra Ryan. The film was to depict the final three years of Gaye's life. Years later, other producers such as Jean-Luc Van Damme, Frederick Bestall and Jimmy De Brabant, came aboard and Goodman was replaced by Julien Temple. Lenny Kravitz was almost slated to play Gaye. The script was to be written by Matthew Broughton. The film was to have been distributed by Focus Features and released on April 1, 2014, the thirtieth anniversary of Gaye's death. This never came to fruition and it was announced that Focus Features no longer has involvement with the Gaye biopic as of June 2013.

In June 2008, it was announced that F. Gary Gray was going to direct a biopic titled Marvin. The script was to be written by C. Gaby Mitchell and the film was to be produced by David Foster and Duncan McGillivray and co-produced by Ryan Heppe. According to Gray, the film would cover Gaye's entire life, from his emergence at Motown through his defiance of Berry Gordy to record What's Going On and on up to his death.

Cameron Crowe had also been working on a biopic titled My Name Is Marvin. The film was to have been a Sony presentation with Scott Rudin as producer. Both Will Smith and Terrence Howard were considered for the role of Gaye. Crowe later confirmed in August 2011 that he abandoned the project: "We were working on the Marvin Gaye movie which is called My Name is Marvin, but the time just wasn't right for that movie." Members of Gaye's family, such as his ex-wife Janis and his son Marvin III, have expressed opposition to a biopic.

In July 2016, it was announced that a feature film documentary on Gaye would be released the following year delving into his life and the making of his 1971 album What's Going On. The film would be developed by Noah Media Group and Greenlight and is quoted to be "the defining portrait of this visionary artist and his impeccable album" by the film's producers Gabriel Clarke and Torquil Jones. The film will include "unseen footage" of Gaye. Gaye's family approved of the documentary. In November 2016, it was announced that the actor Jamie Foxx was billed to produce a limited biopic series on Gaye's life. The series was approved by Gaye's family, including son Marvin III, who was to serve as executive producer, and Berry Gordy Jr.

On June 18, 2018, it was reported that American rapper Dr. Dre was in talks to produce a biopic about Gaye. In June 2021, it was announced that the film Dre would be producing was greenlighted by Warner Bros. Pictures and would be directed by Allen Hughes.

== Acting ==
Gaye acted in two movies, featuring as a Vietnam veteran in both roles. His first performance was in the 1969 George McCowan film The Ballad of Andy Crocker, which starred Lee Majors. The film was about a war veteran returning to find that his expectations have not been met and he feels betrayed. Gaye had a prominent role in the film as David Owens. His other performance was in 1971. He had a role in the Lee Frost-directed biker-exploitation film Chrome and Hot Leather, about a group of Vietnam veterans taking on a bike gang. The film starred William Smith; Gaye played the part of Jim, one of the veterans.

Gaye did have acting aspirations and had signed with the William Morris Agency but that only lasted a year as Gaye was not satisfied with the support he was getting from the agency. In his interview with David Ritz, Gaye admitted being interested in show business particularly when he was hired to compose the soundtrack for Trouble Man. "No doubt I could have been a movie star, but it was something my subconscious rejected. Not that I didn't want it, I most certainly did. I just didn't have the fortitude to play the Hollywood game: to put myself out there, knowing they would eat my rear end like a piece of meat."

== Discography ==
Solo studio albums

- The Soulful Moods of Marvin Gaye (1961)
- That Stubborn Kinda Fellow (1963)
- When I'm Alone I Cry (1964)
- Hello Broadway (1964)
- How Sweet It Is to Be Loved by You (1965)
- A Tribute to the Great Nat King Cole (1965)
- Moods of Marvin Gaye (1966)
- In the Groove (1968)
- M.P.G. (1969)
- That's the Way Love Is (1970)
- What's Going On (1971)
- Trouble Man (1972)
- Let's Get It On (1973)
- I Want You (1976)
- Here, My Dear (1978)
- In Our Lifetime (1981)
- Midnight Love (1982)

Collaborative albums

- Together (with Mary Wells) (1964)
- Take Two (with Kim Weston) (1966)
- United (with Tammi Terrell) (1967)
- You're All I Need (with Tammi Terrell) (1968)
- Easy (with Tammi Terrell) (1969)
- Diana & Marvin (with Diana Ross) (1973)

Posthumous albums

- Dream of a Lifetime (1985)
- Romantically Yours (1985)
- Vulnerable (1997)
- You're the Man (2019)
- Funky Nation: The Detroit Instrumentals (2021)

== Filmography ==
- 1965: T.A.M.I. Show (documentary)
- 1969: The Ballad of Andy Crocker (television movie)
- 1971: Chrome and Hot Leather (television movie)
- 1973: Save the Children (documentary)

== Videography ==
- Marvin Gaye: Live in Montreux 1980 (2003)
- The Real Thing: In Performance (1964–1981) (2006)

== See also ==
- List of American Grammy Award winners and nominees
- Pharrell Williams v. Bridgeport Music
- List of tributes to Marvin Gaye

== General and cited sources ==
- Banks, James G.; Banks, Peter S. (2004). The Unintended Consequences: Family and Community, the Victims of Isolated Poverty. Lanham, Md.: University Press of America. ISBN 9780761828563.
- Batchelor, Bob (2005). Basketball in America: From the Playgrounds to Jordan's Game and Beyond. Haworth Press. ISBN 0-7890-1613-3.
- Berry, William Earl (February 1, 1973). "Marvin Gaye: Inner City Musical Poet". Jet.
- Bowman, Rob (April 2006). Marvin Gaye: The Real Thing (Media notes).
- Brooks-Bertram, Peggy (2009). Uncrowned Queens: African American Women Community Builders of Western New York, Volume 2 (Google eBook). SUNY Press. ISBN 978-0-97229-771-4.
- Browne, Ray B. (2001). The Guide to United States Popular Culture. Popular Press. ISBN 978-0-87972-821-2.
- Collier, Aldore (April 16, 1984). "Marvin Gaye: His Tragic Death and Troubled Life". Jet.
- Collier, Aldore (June 25, 1984). "Marvin Gaye's White Live-In Mate Suffers Miscarriage". Jet.
- Collier, Aldore (April 8, 1985). "A Year Later: What Happened to Marvin Gaye's Family, Fortune?". Jet.
- Collier, Aldore (May 6, 1985). "Book Reveals Marvin Gaye Feared He Would Turn Gay". Jet.
- Collier, Aldore (May 25, 1987). "Marvin Gaye's Mother Dies on Eve of Opening Drug Center She Founded As His Memorial". Jet.
- Collier, Aldore (October 15, 1990). "Gala Celebration Marks Marvin Gaye's Star on Hollywood Walk of Fame". Jet.
- Collier, Aldore (April 23, 1990). "Murphy Requests Walk of Fame Star For Marvin Gaye". Jet.
- Davis, Sharon (1991). Marvin Gaye: I Heard It Through The Grapevine. Croydon, Surrey: Book marque Ltd. ISBN 1-84018-320-9.
- Des Barres, Pamela (1996). Rock Bottom: Dark Moments in Music Babylon. Macmillan. ISBN 0-312-14853-4.
- Dyson, Eric Michael (2004). Mercy Mercy Me: The Art, Loves and Demons of Marvin Gaye. New York/Philadelphia: Basic Civitas. ISBN 0-465-01769-X.
- Edmonds, Ben (2001a). What's Going On?: Marvin Gaye and the Last Days of the Motown Sound. Canongate U.S. ISBN 1-84195-314-8.
- Edmonds, Ben (2001b). Let's Get It On (Deluxe ed.). Motown Records, a Division of UMG Recordings, Inc. MOTD 4757.
- Evelyn, Douglas; Dickson, Paul; Ackerman, S.J. (2008). On This Spot: Pinpointing the Past in Washington, D.C. Sterling, Va.: Capital Books. ISBN 9781933102702.
- Gambaccini, Paul (1987). The Top 100 Rock 'n' Roll Albums of All Time. New York: Harmony Books.
- Garofalo, Reebee (1997). Rockin' Out: Popular Music in the USA. Allyn & Bacon. ISBN 0-205-13703-2.
- Gates, Henry Louis (2004). African American Lives. Oxford University Press. ISBN 978-0-19516-024-6.
- Gaye, Frankie (2003). Marvin Gaye, My Brother. Backbeat Books. ISBN 0-87930-742-0.
- Gaye, Jan; Ritz, David (2015). After the Dance: My Life with Marvin Gaye. HarperCollins. ISBN 0-0621-3551-1.
- Gilmore, Mikal (1998). Night beat: a shadow history of rock & roll. Doubleday. ISBN 978-0-38548-435-0.
- Gulla, Bob (2008). Icons of R&B and Soul: An Encyclopedia of the Artists Who Revolutionized Rhythm. ABC-CLIO. ISBN 978-0-313-34044-4.
- Gutheim, Frederick A.; Lee, Antoinette J. (2006). Worthy of the Nation: Washington, D.C., From L'Enfant to the National Capital Planning Commission. Baltimore, Md.: Johns Hopkins University Press. ISBN 9780801883286.
- Heron, W. Kim (April 8, 1984). Marvin Gaye: A Life Marked by Complexity. Detroit Free Press.
- "Thousands Attend Last Rites For Tammi Terrell". Jet. April 9, 1970.
- "For Reading: Marvin Gaye receives special plaque from Ms. Shirley Temple Black". Jet. November 13, 1975.
- "Landing Marvin Gaye Was a Task For CBS Records". Jet. March 29, 1982.
- Jones, Regina (March 2002). "Unbreakable: Michael Jackson". Vibe.
- Kempton, Arthur (2005). Boogaloo: The Quintessence of American Popular Music. University of Michigan Press. ISBN 978-0-47203-087-3.
- Lynskey, Dorian (April 5, 2011). 33 Revolutions per Minute: A History of Protest Songs, from Billie Holiday to Green Day. HarperCollins. ISBN 978-0-06167-015-2.
- MacKenzie, Alex (2009). The Life and Times of the Motown Stars. Right Recordings. ISBN 978-1-84226-014-2.
- Marx, Eve (September 18, 2009). 101 Things You Didn't Know About Sex (Google eBook). Adams Media. ISBN 978-1-44050-428-0.
- Otfinoski, Steven (2010). African Americans in the Performing Arts. Infobase Publishing. ISBN 978-1-43812-855-9.
- Posner, Gerald (2002). Motown: Music, Money, Sex, and Power. New York: Random House. ISBN 0-375-50062-6.
- Redfern, Nick (February 20, 2007). Celebrity Secrets: Official Government Files on the Rich and Famous. Simon and Schuster. ISBN 978-1-41652-866-1.
- Ritz, David (1991). Divided Soul: The Life of Marvin Gaye. Cambridge, Massachusetts: Da Capo Press. ISBN 0-306-81191-X.
- Ritz, David (July 1985). "The Last Days of Marvin Gaye". Ebony.
- Simmonds, Jeremy (2008). The Encyclopedia of Dead Rock Stars: Heroin, Handguns, and Ham Sandwiches. Chicago Review Press. ISBN 978-1-55652-754-8.
- Turner, Steve (1998). Trouble Man: The Life and Death of Marvin Gaye. London: Michael Joseph. ISBN 0-7181-4112-1.
- Vincent, Rickey (1996). Funk: The Music, the People, and the Rhythm of the One. Macmillan. ISBN 0-312-13499-1.
- Ward, Ed; Geoffrey Stokes; Ken Tucker (1986). Rock of Ages: The Rolling Stone History of Rock and Roll. Rolling Stone Press. ISBN 0-671-54438-1.
- Weinger, Harry (November 5, 1994). "Jobete: Publishing Is The Highly Polished Jewel In The Gordy Co.'s Crown". Billboard.
- Whitburn, Joel (2004). The Billboard Book of Top 40 Hits: Complete Chart Information About America's Most Popular Songs and Artists, 1955–2003. Billboard Books. ISBN 0-8230-7499-4.
- White, Adam (1985). The Motown Story. London: Orbis. ISBN 0-85613-626-3.
