= List of awards and nominations received by Marvin Gaye =

Marvin Gaye awards and nominations
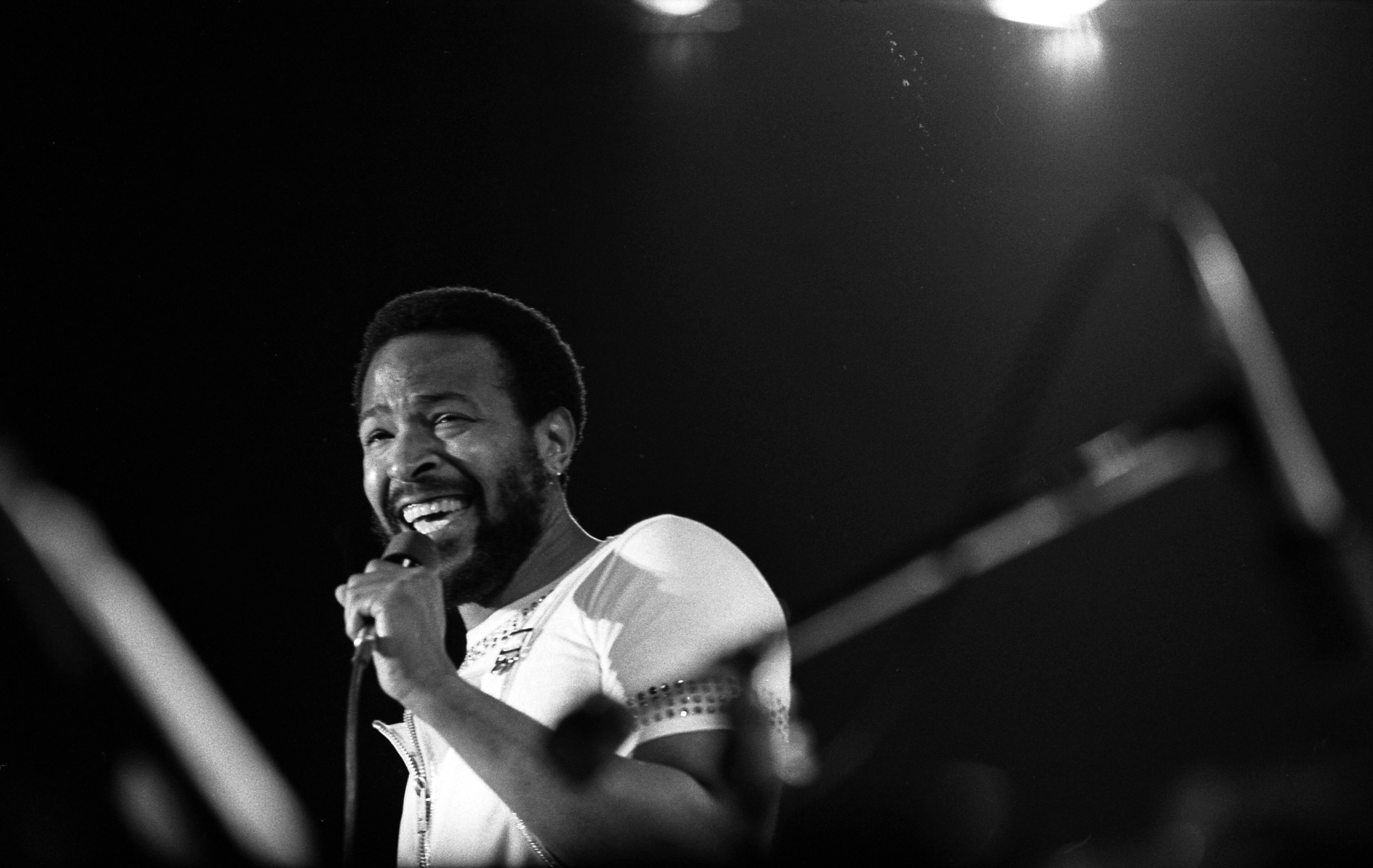
- Gaye in 1974
Awards and nominations
Award	Wins	Nominations
American Music Awards	1	4
Billboard Number-One Awards	6	77
Grammy Awards	3	13
Grammy Hall of Fame	5	5
NAACP Image Award	6	7

Totals (Note: Certain award groups do not simply award one winner. They acknowledge several different recipients, have runners-up, and have third place. Since this is a specific recognition and is different from losing an award, runner-up mentions are considered wins in this award tally. For simplification and to avoid errors, each award in this list has been presumed to have had a prior nomination.)
- Wins: 57
- Nominations: 140

American singer-songwriter Marvin Gaye (1939–1984) is the recipient of various accolades. Known for helping to shape the Motown sound during the 1960s and 1970s, he was nicknamed "Prince of Motown" and "Prince of Soul".

During his lifetime, he received a number of nominations and awards in ceremonies such as Billboard Number-One Awards, American Music Awards, Cash Box Awards, NAACP Image Award and ASCAP Awards. Gaye achieved two Grammy Awards from 12 nominations, and received an additional Lifetime Achievement Award.

Marvin Gaye has been admitted into a number of halls and walks of fame, including Rock and Roll, NAACP, Songwriters and Grammy Hall of Fame, as well as the Hollywood Walk of Fame and Hollywood Rock Walk. In addition, many organizations have posthumously bestowed Gaye with tributes, including a stamp dedicated by the United States Postal Service in 2019, and a special tribute on the 2016 Kennedy Center Honors. In 2017, SiriusXM named him Artist of the Year.

Outside of his work in music, he received a Moon Lady Award for helping underprivileged children. In 1972, Billboard honored him with a Trendsetter Award for "promoting the cause of ecology through thought-provoking message songs". He was also condecorated by Kennedy Center Honors and with a keys to the city by then Washington mayor, Walter Washington.

== Awards and nominations ==
Award/organization (Note: Charts are not included, unless they are explicitly described as "awards" or specific trophies are given.)	Year	Nominee/work	Category	Result	Ref.
American Black Achievement Awards	1984	Marvin Gaye	Music Award	Honoree	
American Music Awards	1974	Let's Get It On	Favorite Soul/R&B Album	Nominated	
American Music Awards	1975	Let's Get It On	Favorite Soul/R&B Album	Nominated	
American Music Awards	1977	Marvin Gaye	Favorite Soul/R&B Male Artist	Nominated	
American Music Awards	1983	"Sexual Healing"	Favorite Soul/R&B Song	Won	
AMOA Jukebox Awards	1983	"Sexual Healing"	Best Soul Record	Nominated	
AMOA Jukebox Awards	1994	Marvin Gaye	Hall of Fame inductee	Inductee	
ASCAP Awards	1992	"Mercy Mercy Mercy Me (The Ecology)"	Award-winning song	Won	
ASCAP Awards	1992	"Baby, I'm for Real"	Award-winning song	Won	
ASCAP Pop Awards	1984	"Sexual Healing"	Award-winning song	Won	
ASCAP Pop Awards	2003	"What's Going On"	Award-winning song	Won	
ASCAP Rhythm & Soul Awards	1999	Marvin Gaye	Special Tribute Award	Won	
ASCAP Rhythm & Soul Awards	2002	"Music"	Award-Winning R&B/hip-hop songs	Won	
Billboard Number-One Awards	1971	Marvin Gaye	Top Singles Artist	Nominated	
Billboard Number-One Awards	1971	Marvin Gaye	Top Album Artist	Nominated	
Billboard Number-One Awards	1971	Marvin Gaye	Top Male Vocalist	Won	
Billboard Number-One Awards	1971	Marvin Gaye	Top Singles Soul Artist	Nominated	
Billboard Number-One Awards	1971	Marvin Gaye	Top Album Male Vocalist	Nominated	
Billboard Number-One Awards	1971	Marvin Gaye	Top Album Soul Vocalist	Nominated	
Billboard Number-One Awards	1971	Marvin Gaye	Top Producers	Nominated	
Billboard Number-One Awards	1971	"What's Going On"	Top Pop Single	Nominated	
Billboard Number-One Awards	1971	"Mercy Mercy Me (The Ecology)"	Top Pop Single	Nominated	
Billboard Number-One Awards	1971	"Inner City Blues (Make Me Wanna Holler)"	Top Soul Single	Nominated	
Billboard Number-One Awards	1971	"What's Going On"	Top Soul Single	Nominated	
Billboard Number-One Awards	1971	"Mercy Mercy Me (The Ecology)"	Top Soul Single	Nominated	
Billboard Number-One Awards	1971	What's Going On	Top Popular Artist	Nominated	
Billboard Number-One Awards	1971	What's Going On	Top Soul Album	Nominated	
Billboard Number-One Awards	1972	Marvin Gaye	Number One Awards	Won	
Billboard Number-One Awards	1972	Marvin Gaye	Trendsetter Award	Honoree	
Billboard Number-One Awards	1972	Marvin Gaye	Top Album Soul Artists	Nominated	
Billboard Number-One Awards	1972	What's Going On	Top Soul Album	Nominated	
Billboard Number-One Awards	1973	Marvin Gaye	Top Singles Artist	Nominated	
Billboard Number-One Awards	1973	Marvin Gaye	Top Album Artist	Nominated	
Billboard Number-One Awards	1973	Marvin Gaye	Top Album Male Artist	Nominated	
Billboard Number-One Awards	1973	Marvin Gaye	Top Album Soul Artist	Nominated	
Billboard Number-One Awards	1973	Marvin Gaye	Top Singles Male Vocalist	Nominated	
Billboard Number-One Awards	1973	Marvin Gaye	Top Singles Soul Artist	Nominated	
Billboard Number-One Awards	1973	Marvin Gaye	Top Pop Producer	Nominated	
Billboard Number-One Awards	1973	"Let's Get It On"	Top Pop Single	Nominated	
Billboard Number-One Awards	1973	"Let's Get It On"	Top Soul Single	Won	
Billboard Number-One Awards	1973	"Trouble Man"	Top Soul Single	Nominated	
Billboard Number-One Awards	1973	Let's Get It On	Top Soul Album	Nominated	
Billboard Number-One Awards	1973	Trouble Man	Top Soul Album	Nominated	
Billboard Number-One Awards	1974	Marvin Gaye	Top Pop Producer	Nominated	
Billboard Number-One Awards	1974	Marvin Gaye	Top Pop Album Artist	Nominated	
Billboard Number-One Awards	1974	Marvin Gaye	Top Pop Albums Male Artist	Nominated	
Billboard Number-One Awards	1974	Marvin Gaye	Top Pop Singles Artist	Nominated	
Billboard Number-One Awards	1974	Marvin Gaye	Top Soul Singles Artist	Nominated	
Billboard Number-One Awards	1974	Marvin Gaye	Top Soul Album Artist	Nominated	
Billboard Number-One Awards	1974	Diana Ross and Marvin Gaye	Top Pop Singles Duos, Groups	Nominated	
Billboard Number-One Awards	1974	Diana Ross and Marvin Gaye	Top Pop Album Artist	Nominated	
Billboard Number-One Awards	1974	Diana Ross and Marvin Gaye	Top Pop Singles Artist	Nominated	
Billboard Number-One Awards	1974	Diana Ross and Marvin Gaye	Top Soul Album Artist	Nominated	
Billboard Number-One Awards	1974	Diana Ross and Marvin Gaye	Top Pop Albums, New Duos, Groups	Won	
Billboard Number-One Awards	1974	Let's Get It On	Top Pop Album	Nominated	
Billboard Number-One Awards	1974	Let's Get It On	Top Soul Album	Nominated	
Billboard Number-One Awards	1974	Diana & Marvin	Top Soul Album	Nominated	
Billboard Number-One Awards	1974	Marvin Gaye Live!	Top Soul Album	Nominated	
Billboard Number-One Awards	1975	Marvin Gaye Live!	Top Soul Album	Nominated	
Billboard Number-One Awards	1976	I Want You	Top Pop Album	Nominated	
Billboard Number-One Awards	1976	I Want You	Top Soul Album	Nominated	
Billboard Number-One Awards	1976	Marvin Gaye	Top Album Artist	Nominated	
Billboard Number-One Awards	1976	Marvin Gaye	Top Artist	Nominated	
Billboard Number-One Awards	1976	Marvin Gaye	Top Soul Artist	Nominated	
Billboard Number-One Awards	1976	"I Want You"	Top Single	Nominated	
Billboard Number-One Awards	1977	Marvin Gaye	Pop Male Artist	Nominated	
Billboard Number-One Awards	1977	Marvin Gaye	Soul Artist	Nominated	
Billboard Number-One Awards	1977	Marvin Gaye	Soul Singles Artist	Nominated	
Billboard Number-One Awards	1977	Marvin Gaye	Pop Single Artist	Nominated	
Billboard Number-One Awards	1977	Marvin Gaye	Pop Album Artist	Nominated	
Billboard Number-One Awards	1977	Marvin Gaye	Disco Artist	Nominated	
Billboard Number-One Awards	1977	"Got to Give It Up"	Pop Single	Nominated	
Billboard Number-One Awards	1977	"Got to Give It Up"	Soul Single	Nominated	
Billboard Number-One Awards	1977	"Got to Give It Up"	Disco Audience Response	Nominated	
Billboard Number-One Awards	1977	Live at the London Palladium	Pop Album	Nominated	
Billboard Number-One Awards	1977	Live at the London Palladium	Soul Album	Nominated	
Billboard Number-One Awards	1979	Here, My Dear	Top Album	Nominated	
Billboard Number-One Awards	1979	Marvin Gaye	Top Album Artist	Nominated	
Billboard Number-One Awards	1983	Marvin Gaye	Pop Artists	Nominated	
Billboard Number-One Awards	1983	Marvin Gaye	Black Artists	Runner-up	
Billboard Number-One Awards	1983	Marvin Gaye	Pop Albums Artists	Nominated	
Billboard Number-One Awards	1983	Marvin Gaye	Pop Singles Artists	Nominated	
Billboard Number-One Awards	1983	Marvin Gaye	Pop Albums Artists - Male	Nominated	
Billboard Number-One Awards	1983	Marvin Gaye	Pop Singles Artists - Male	Nominated	
Billboard Number-One Awards	1983	Marvin Gaye	Black Singles Artists	Runner-up	
Billboard Number-One Awards	1983	Marvin Gaye	Black Albums Artists	Runner-up	
Billboard Number-One Awards	1983	Midnight Love	Pop Albums	Nominated	
Billboard Number-One Awards	1983	Midnight Love	Black Albums	Runner-up	
Billboard Number-One Awards	1983	"Sexual Healing"	Pop Singles	Nominated	
Billboard Number-One Awards	1983	"Sexual Healing"	Black Singles	Won	
Cash Box Awards	1967	Marvin Gaye	Male Vocalist of the Year	Nominated	
Cash Box Awards	1971	Marvin Gaye	Male Vocalist of the Year	Won	
Cash Box Awards	1971	What's Going On	Special Achievement Award	Honoree	
DC Walk of Fame	2018	Marvin Gaye	Walk of Fame/Medallion	Won	
Grammy Awards	1968	"Ain't No Mountain High Enough"	Best Rhythm & Blues Group Performance, Vocal Or Instrumental	Nominated	
Grammy Awards	1969	"I Heard It Through The Grapevine"	Best Rhythm & Blues Vocal Performance, Male	Nominated	
Grammy Awards	1972	"Inner City Blues (Make You Wanna Holler)"	Best R&B Vocal Performance, Male	Nominated	
Grammy Awards	1974	Let's Get It On	Best R&B Vocal Performance, Male	Nominated	
Grammy Awards	1975	Marvin Gaye Live!	Best R&B Vocal Performance, Male	Nominated	
Grammy Awards	1977	"After the Dance"	Best R&B Instrumental Performance	Nominated	
Grammy Awards	1977	I Want You	Best R&B Vocal Performance, Male	Nominated	
Grammy Awards	1978	"Got to Give It Up"	Best R&B Vocal Performance, Male	Nominated	
Grammy Awards	1983	"Sexual Healing"	Best R&B Vocal Performance, Male	Won	
Grammy Awards	1983	"Sexual Healing"	Best R&B Instrumental Performance	Won	
Grammy Awards	1983	"Sexual Healing"	Best Rhythm & Blues Song	Nominated	
Grammy Awards	1984	Midnight Love	Best R&B Vocal Performance, Male	Nominated	
Grammy Awards	1996	Marvin Gaye	Lifetime Achievement Award	Honoree	
Grammy Hall of Fame	1999	"Ain't No Mountain High Enough"	Hall of Fame inductee	Inductee	
Grammy Hall of Fame	1998	"I Heard It Through the Grapevine"	Hall of Fame inductee	Inductee	
Grammy Hall of Fame	2004	Let's Get It On	Hall of Fame inductee	Inductee	
Grammy Hall of Fame	2002	"Mercy Mercy Me (The Ecology)"	Hall of Fame inductee	Inductee	
Grammy Hall of Fame	1998	What's Going On	Hall of Fame inductee	Inductee	
Hollywood Rock Walk	1989	Marvin Gaye	Walk of Fame	Inductee	
Hollywood Walk of Fame	1990	Marvin Gaye	Walk of Star	Inductee	
Howard Theatre Walk of Fame	2018	Marvin Gaye	Walk of Star	Inductee	
Michigan Rock and Roll Legends Hall of Fame	2005	Marvin Gaye	Hall of Fame inductee	Inductee	.
Moon Lady Award	1976	Marvin Gaye	To the cause of underprivileged children	Honoree	
NAACP Image Award	1971	Marvin Gaye	Producer of the Year	Won	
NAACP Image Award	1971	Marvin Gaye	Male Vocalist of the Year	Won	
NAACP Image Award	1971	What's Going On	Album of the Year	Won	
NAACP Image Award	1974	Marvin Gaye	Best Male Vocalist	Won	
NAACP Image Award	1974	Let's Get It On	Record of the Year	Won	
NAACP Image Award	1975	Marvin Gaye	Best Male Vocalist	Nominated	
NAACP Image Award	1988	Marvin Gaye	NAACP Image Award – Hall of Fame Award	Inductee	
National Association of Television and Radio Announcers (NATRA)	1969	Marvin Gaye and Tammi Terrell	Rhythm And Blues Duo Award	Won	
National Association of Television and Radio Announcers (NATRA)	1971	Marvin Gaye	Male Vocalist	Won	
National Association of Television and Radio Announcers (NATRA)	1971	"What's Going On"	Best Record	Won	
National Association of Television and Radio Announcers (NATRA)	1971	What's Going On	Best Album	Won	
National Recording Preservation Board	2003	"What's Going On"	Preserved	Honoree	
Online Film & Television Association	2001	"Let's Get It On"	Best Music, Adapted Song (High Fidelity)	Nominated	
Record Mirror Poll Awards	1964	Marvin Gaye	Top Male Artistes	Nominated	
Record World Awards	1971	Marvin Gaye	Male Vocalist of the Year	Won	
Record World Awards	1971	What's Going On	Record of the Year	Won	
Record World Awards	1974	"Let's Get It On"	Top Record — Singles Artist	Nominated	
Rock and Roll Hall of Fame	1987	Marvin Gaye	Hall of Fame inductee	Inductee	
Rhythm and Blues Foundation	2000	Marvin Gaye	Pioneer Award	Honoree	
Rhythm & Blues Hall of Fame	2014	Marvin Gaye	Hall of Fame inductee	Inductee	
Songwriters Hall of Fame	2016	Marvin Gaye	Hall of Fame inductee	Inductee	
Soul Train 25th Anniversary Hall of Fame	1995	Marvin Gaye	Hall of Fame inductee	Inductee	
Washington Area Music Association Hall of Fame	1985	Marvin Gaye	Hall of Fame inductee	Inductee	

== Other honors ==
Country	Year	Honor	Result	Ref.
United States	1972	Marvin Gaye's Day, Washington	Honoree	
United States	1983	Kennedy Center Honors	Honoree	
United States	1972	Keys to the City, Washington from mayor Walter Washington	Honoree	

=== Listicles ===
Name of publisher, name of listicle, year(s) listed, and placement result
Publisher	Listicle	Year(s)	Result	Ref.
CBS News	The Essential American Songbook	2026	"What's Going On"	
CBS News	The Essential American Songbook	2026	"I Heard It Through the Grapevine"	
CBS News	The Essential American Songbook	2026	"What's Happening, Brother"	
RIAA/NEA	Songs of the Century	2001	"I Heard It Through the Grapevine" (21)	
RIAA/NEA	Songs of the Century	2001	"What's Going On" (65)	
RIAA/NEA	Songs of the Century	2001	"Ain't No Mountain High Enough" (w/Tammi Terrell) (140)	

== See also ==
- List of tributes to Marvin Gaye
