= When I'm Alone I Cry =

Studio album by Marvin Gaye
- Released: April 1, 1964
- Recorded: 1963–64
- Studio: Unspecified studios in New York City and Chicago; vocals recorded at Graystone Ballroom, Detroit, Michigan
- Genre: Soul; jazz
- Length: 36:55
- Label: Tamla; TM-251
- Producer: Clarence Paul, William "Mickey" Stevenson

Marvin Gaye chronology
Marvin Gaye Recorded Live on Stage (1963)	When I'm Alone I Cry (1964)	Greatest Hits (1964)

When I'm Alone I Cry is the third studio album by American singer Marvin Gaye, released in 1964. It was one of several attempts by the singer and his record company, Motown, to make his name as a jazz vocalist.

== Recording ==
The album includes ten pop and jazz standards; at Gaye's request, two of the songs were taken from Billie Holiday's album Lady in Satin. The backing tracks were recorded by producer Clarence Paul in New York City and Chicago, using arrangers Jerome Richardson, Melba Liston, and Ernie Wilkins. Gaye overdubbed the vocal tracks after returning to Detroit from touring.

== Critical reception ==
Professional ratings
Review scores
Source	Rating
AllMusic	2/5 stars

Critic Richie Unterberger describes the album as "competently done, but ... supper-club fare, in which Gaye comes off as a sub-Nat King Cole rather than his own man." Gaye's biographer David Ritz says: "His ballad style remained self-conscious and restrained... The results were flat, though on the up-tempo numbers he swung effortlessly, demonstrating his natural feel for jazz." After When I'm Alone I Cry was unsuccessful upon its release, Gaye finally gave way to pressure to record more R&B and soul material. By the end of the decade, he had become one of the best-selling and most revered soul artists of his generation.

== Track listing ==
=== Side one ===
1. "You've Changed" (Bill Carey, Carl Fischer) – 3:33
2. "I Was Telling Her About You" (Morris Charlap, Don George) – 4:48
3. "I Wonder" (Cecil Gant, Raymond Leaven) – 3:46
4. "I'll Be Around" (Alec Wilder, William Engvick) – 4:09
5. "Because of You" (Arthur Hammerstein, Dudley Wilkinson) – 3:34

=== Side two ===
1. "I Don't Know Why (I Just Do)" (Fred E. Ahlert, Roy Turk) – 2:46
2. "I've Grown Accustomed to Her Face" (Alan Jay Lerner, Frederick Loewe) – 3:32
3. "When Your Lover Has Gone" (Einar Aaron Swan) – 4:40
4. "When I'm Alone I Cry" (Avery Vandenberg, Morris Broadnax, Fredericka Foreman) – 2:47
5. "If My Heart Could Sing" (Avery Vandenberg, Morris Broadnax) – 3:20
