= The Real Thing: In Performance (1964–1981) =

Video by Marvin Gaye
- Released: April 3, 2006
- Recorded: 1964–1981
- Genre: Soul, Motown
- Length: 150 mins
- Label: Motown
- Producer: David Peck & Phil Galloway (Reelin' in the Years Productions); Olivier Robert Murphy, Ian Brenchley & Jamie Hole (Universal Music Group International)

Marvin Gaye chronology
Marvin Gaye: Live in Montreux 1980 (2003)	The Real Thing: In Performance (1964–1981) (2006)	What's Going On (2006)

The Real Thing: In Performance (1964–1981) is an anthology of performances by Marvin Gaye. It was produced by Reelin' in the Years Productions and the Universal Music Group International. It includes a 24-page booklet with an extensive essay by Grammy Award-winning writer, Rob Bowman.

== Track listing ==
=== Main tracks ===
1. "Hitch Hike" (from American Bandstand – December 13, 1964)
2. "Pride and Joy" (from Shivaree – December 4, 1965)
3. "Can I Get a Witness" (from Hollywood A Go-Go – November 27, 1965)
4. "Pretty Little Baby" (from Swingin' Time – December 15, 1965)
5. "Ain't That Peculiar" (from Swingin' Time – December 15, 1965)
6. "You're a Wonderful One" (from The New Lloyd Thaxton Show – November 18, 1965)
7. "Ain't No Mountain High Enough" (with Tammi Terrell) (from Swingin' Sounds of Expo '67 – 1967)
8. "I Heard It Through the Grapevine" (from The Hollywood Palace – January 7, 1969)
9. "What's Going On" (from Save the Children – September 27, 1972)
10. "What's Happening Brother" (from Save The Children – September 27, 1972)
11. "Come Get to This" (from Zomerhappening – July 4, 1981)
12. "Let's Get It On" (from Zomerhappening – July 4, 1981)
13. "Distant Lover" (from Dinah and Friends – October 10, 1979)
14. "A Funky Space Reincarnation" (promotional film)
15. "Ego Tripping Out" (from Dinah and Friends – October 10, 1979)
16. "Heavy Love Affair" (from Follies – May 7, 1981)

All tracks have been remastered for this release.

== Personnel ==
- Marvin Gaye
