= Benning Terrace =

Public housing project in Washington, D.C., United States

Coordinates: 38°52′50″N 76°56′15″W

General information
- Location: 4450 G Street SE, Washington, D.C., United States
- Year built: 1958

Benning Terrace is a public housing project consisting of 274 apartments and townhouses in southeast Washington, D.C. located east of the Anacostia River in the Benning Ridge neighborhood. It is known to the natives as "Simple City."

== Housing Project ==
Built in 1958, Benning Terrace is a public housing project of townhouses and low-rise apartments. It consists of 274 units in three buildings in the area around G St SE and 46th St SE. The complex also includes the Benning Terrace Community Center and a football field.

== Conflict and Intervention ==
Benning Terrace, also known as "Simple City," "Simp", and "Baby Vietnam", earned a reputation in the 1990s as the center of violent gang activity. In 1997, after a rash of murders, the National Center for Neighborhood Enterprise (CNE), along with the Alliance of Concerned Men and the District of Columbia Housing Authority Office of Public Safety, came together to bring gang warring to a halt. (Community leader Robert Woodson was also said to have intervened). Aggressive community intervention strategies followed; young gang members were provided with jobs and themselves became advocates for the community, coaching sports and activities to help keep the area's children and young people out of gangs.

While the community efforts in Benning Terrace were hailed for their remarkable results over the first few years, by the late 2000s violence resurfaced in the area. Pledging support for the area, in 2008 newly elected D.C. Mayor Adrian Fenty dedicated a new sports field and playground at the complex. But in March 2011, 13 young men living in Benning Terrace were indicted for violent crimes. Witnesses noted, "[they have] resumed old feuds that ... their uncles and older brothers once resolved.
