= The Marquees =

American band

- The Marquees in 1957

Background information
- Origin: Washington, D.C., United States
- Genres: Doo-wop
- Years active: 1957–1960
- Labels: Okeh, Chess
- Past members: Chester Simmons; Reese Palmer; Marvin Gaye; James Nolan; Harvey Fuqua; Chuck Barksdale

The Marquees were an American doo-wop group formed in Washington, D.C., United States, in 1957. Evolving from the former group the Rainbows, the Marquees included Marvin Gaye and backed musicians such as Bo Diddley and Billy Stewart. The group also recorded as the New Moonglows with singer Harvey Fuqua.

== History ==
The group evolved from another doo wop group known as the Rainbows, who had an influential presence on the Washington D.C. music scene and released three singles for Bobby Robinson's Red Robin Records. Although the Rainbows were not very commercially successful on a national level, songs such as "Mary Lee", "Shirley," and "Minnie" have since become collectors' favorites. Founder of the Rainbows, Chester Simmons (bass), formed the Marquees with singers who had occasionally performed in his former group, including Reese Palmer (first tenor), Marvin Gaye (second tenor, baritone; he would change the spelling to "Gaye" when he became a soloist), and James Nolan (baritone). Simmons had partnered with Gaye to join the Marquees, a name proposed by Gaye himself, after he had recently returned from the United States Air Force in early 1957.

The group performed in the D.C. area and soon were introduced to Bo Diddley, who began working with the Marquees in his home recording studio. Diddley assigned the Marquees to Columbia subsidiary label Okeh Records after unsuccessfully attempting to get the group signed to his own label, Chess. On September 25, 1957, the group entered the CBS Building in New York City to record five songs. Among them were "Wyatt Earp" and "Hey Little School Girl", backed by Diddley's band, as well as "Billy's Heartaches" and "Baby, You're My Only Love", which had the Marquees record with singer Billy Stewart. Re-recorded versions of "Wyatt Earp" and "Hey Little School Girl" and Stewart's sides were released in November 1957; however, Okeh completely ignored the records and they quickly fell out of public notice.

Despite the commercial flop, Simmons, who was previously a driver for Diddley, was able to chauffeur Harvey Fuqua in late 1958, who informed Simmons his group the Moonglows were on the verge of disbanding. In January 1959, once the original Moonglows concluded a series of performances at the Apollo Theater, Fuqua formed the New Moonglows with the Marquees. The group toured across the US, recruiting bass singer Chuck Barksdale, previously of the Dells, while in Chicago. With Fuqua, the New Moonglows recorded six sides for Chess, releasing "Twelve Months of the Year" paired with "Don't Be Afraid to Love", a tune which featured the old Moonglows group. Additionally the group, minus Fuqua and Barksdale, backed Chuck Berry on "Almost Grown" and "Back in the U.S.A." as well as Diddley on "I'm Sorry". By mid-1959, the group was scheduled to appear on Dick Clark's television program American Bandstand; however, Fuqua was contractually obligated to perform with his former line-up.

In 1960, the New Moonglows released their follow-up single, "Mama Loochie", which was Gaye's first lead vocal recording. As a result of a lack of commercial success and Fuqua's interest to establish his own record label, the group disbanded soon after. Gaye relocated to Detroit with Fuqua where he signed with Tri-Phi Records as a session musician, before achieving tremendous success as a solo artist. Simmons became an independent record producer in the mid-1960s.

Reese Palmer died on October 27, 2011 from prostate cancer. Chuck Barksdale died on May 15, 2019.
