= Marvin Gaye: Live in Montreux 1980 =

Video by Marvin Gaye
- Released: 2003
- Recorded: July 17, 1980, Montreux, Switzerland
- Genre: Soul, funk, blaxploitation, disco, Motown

Marvin Gaye chronology
Marvin Gaye: Live in Montreux 1980 (2003)	The Real Thing: In Performance (1964–1981) (2006)

Marvin Gaye: Live in Montreux 1980 is a taped performance of singer Marvin Gaye's performance at the Montreux Jazz Festival, recorded on July 17, 1980. Gaye included this performance as part of a European tour. Gaye performs a majority of his hits from his recent disco-funk hits "Got to Give It Up" and "A Funky Space Reincarnation", to his duet hits with Tammi Terrell including "Ain't No Mountain High Enough" and "Ain't Nothing Like the Real Thing", in which Gaye re-interpolated the songs as a somber tribute to Terrell, who died over a decade before, to sixties Motown classics such as "I'll Be Doggone", "Ain't That Peculiar", "How Sweet It Is (To Be Loved By You)" and "I Heard It through the Grapevine", to seventies standards such as "What's Going On", "Trouble Man" and "Let's Get It On". The Montreux set was later released as a CD/DVD in 2003.

== Track listing ==
=== Main tracks ===
1. "Time to Get It Together (overture/introduction)"
2. "Got to Give It Up"
3. "A Funky Space Reincarnation"
4. "After the Dance (Hellos)"
5. "Come Get to This"
6. "Let's Get It On"
7. "After the Dance"
8. "Tammi Terrell medley: "If This World Were Mine"/"Ain't Nothing Like the Real Thing"/"Ain't No Mountain High Enough"
9. "How Sweet It Is (To Be Loved By You)"
10. "Ain't That Peculiar"
11. "I'll Be Doggone"
12. "I Heard It through the Grapevine"
13. "Trouble Man"
14. "Distant Lover"
15. "Inner City Blues (Make Me Wanna Holler)"
16. "Mercy Mercy Me (The Ecology)"
17. "What's Going On"

== Personnel ==
Adapted from DVD liner notes

- Marvin Gaye Jr. - Vocals
- Reginald Mullen - Trumpet
- Rick Gardner - Trumpet
- Kush Griffitt - Trumpet, Horn Arrangement
- David Majai Li - Saxophone
- Gordon Banks - Lead Guitar
- Howard Westbrook - Rhythm Guitar
- Frank Blair - Bass Guitar
- William "Snoopy" Bryant II - Piano
- Lonnie Smith - Keyboards
- Sandra Akaka - Congas
- Joseph Mayo - Congas
- Checo Tohomaso - Percussion
- Preston McRae Wilcox - Drums
- Lecester Kentel - Vocals
- Frankie Bates - Vocals
- Robert Stevenson - Vocals
