= Almost Grown =

Almost Grown may refer to:

- Almost Grown (Grey's Anatomy), an episode of the American medical drama Grey's Anatomy
- Almost Grown (TV series), an American television series
- "Almost Grown" (song), a 1959 song by Chuck Berry
- Almost Grown, a 1963 album by The Animals
