= Marvin Gaye at the Copa =

Live album by Marvin Gaye
- Released: April 29, 2005
- Recorded: August 12–13, 1966
- Genre: Soul, pop standard, vocal jazz
- Length: 64:02
- Label: Hip-O Select
- Producer: Harry Weinger

Marvin Gaye chronology
Gold (2005)	Marvin Gaye at the Copa (2005)	The Love Collection (2006)

Marvin Gaye at the Copa is a live album recorded at the exclusive New York club, the Copacabana, where singer Marvin Gaye performed in August 1966, over a year following The Supremes' 1965 performance there. Marvin was only one of just a few R&B musicians after Sam Cooke and Jackie Wilson to perform at the club where performers such as Sammy Davis Jr., Nat King Cole and Frank Sinatra had performed regularly. Marvin was the next act from Berry Gordy's fabled Motown label after the Supremes to perform at the nightclub and would be followed by The Temptations in 1968 and Martha and the Vandellas that same year. According to the liner notes later on, Marvin's performance there was a success; however, an ongoing feud between Gaye and his brother-in-law, Motown recording boss Gordy, was said to have been one of the reasons why the album was eventually shelved with the duo fighting over how the album was to be produced. The album had been scheduled for release in January 1967 as Tamla 273 before its permanent shelving. In 2005, Hip-O Select Records, a Motown-associated label created to re-release or release unreleased material from Motown's vaults re-mastered sessions from this album and released it that year.

Professional ratings
Review scores
Source	Rating
Allmusic	link

== Track listing ==
1. "Introduction/I Concentrate on You" (Cole Porter) - 3:19
2. "Just in Time" (Betty Comden, Adolph Green, Jule Styne) - 1:58
3. "How Sweet It Is (To Be Loved By You)" (Holland-Dozier-Holland) - 4:48
4. "Motown Medley 1" ["Can I Get A Witness", "You're A Wonderful One", "Stubborn Kind Of Fellow", "Baby Don't You Do It", "Try It Baby", "One More Heartache"] (Gaye, Lamont Dozier, Berry Gordy Jr., George Gordy, Brian Holland, William "Mickey" Stevenson, Edward Holland Jr.) - 5:57
5. "Laia Ladaia (Reza)" (Edu Lobo, Ruy Guerra, Norman Gimbel) - 5:08
6. "Georgia Rose" (Hoagy Carmichael, Jimmy Flynn, Stuart Gorrell, Harry Rosenthal, Alexander Sullivan) - 3:35
7. "The Song Is You" (Jerome Kern, Oscar Hammerstein II) - 2:22
8. "Ain't That Peculiar" (William "Smokey" Robinson, Bobby Rogers, Ronald White, Marvin Tarplin) - 3:42
9. "Every Once in a While" (Harold Rome) - 2:32
10. "The Shadow of Your Smile" (Johnny Mandel, Paul Francis Webster) - 3:13
11. "Night Song" (Charles Strouse) - 5:06
12. "Pride and Joy" (Gaye, Stevenson, Norman Whitfield) - 5:39
13. "This Could Be the Start of Something Big" (Steve Allen) - 2:04
14. "Strangers in the Night" (Charles Singleton, Eddie Snyder) - 3:27
15. "Introduction of Orchestra" - 1:23
16. "Who Can I Turn To (When Nobody Needs Me)" (Leslie Bricusse, Anthony Newley) - 3:18
17. "Motown Medley 2" ["I'll Be Doggone", "I Can't Help Myself", "Uptight", "Hitch Hike"] (Smokey Robinson, Henry Cosby, Lamont Dozier, Brian Holland, Warren "Pete" Moore, Marvin Tarplin, Edward Holland Jr.) - 8:32
