= List of tributes to Marvin Gaye =

== Albums ==
Several albums have been released to commemorate Gaye's influence on popular music.

Among the two albums released include Inner City Blues: The Music of Marvin Gaye, released in 1994 in collaboration with MTV, who previewed the album's contents with the airing of the documentary about Gaye, also titled Inner City Blues: The Music of Marvin Gaye, that featured vintage Gaye performances, as well as performances of his songs by other artists, notably Stevie Wonder, Madonna, Bono and Gaye's daughter, Nona.

The second tribute album, Marvin Is 60: A Tribute Album, was released in 1999 on Motown in celebration of Gaye's 60th birthday. Released that June, the album featured Erykah Badu, D'Angelo and Will Downing. The respective artists released songs from the tribute album including covers of "Your Precious Love" and "You Sure Love to Ball" to R&B radio stations.

R&B band Frankie Beverly & Maze based their 1989 album, Silky Soul on Gaye, who had served as the band's early mentor following their early years. The title track was recorded as a tribute to Gaye and interpolated Gaye's melody from "What's Going On". The song was released as a single and became a top-ten hit on the R&B chart. Marvin's daughter Nona was featured in the video.

Upon reviewing her albums, Janet Jackson's Rhythm Nation 1814 and janet., David Ritz compared Jackson's switching of topics from social issues to sensual material to that of Gaye's.

Jazz composer Don Byron's album, Don Byron's String Quartet No. 2: Four Thoughts on Marvin Gaye, I-IV, A Tribute to the Life of Marvin Gaye was released by the string quartet Ethel on the album, Heavy (Innova, 2012).

American DJ and producer Amerigo Gazaway released an album in 2014, remixing the work of hip hop artist Mos Def with Marvin Gaye's music.

== Songs ==
Even before Gaye's death in 1984, Gaye was mentioned by name in a couple of songs. In Spandau Ballet's breakthrough single, "True", one verse cited "listening to Marvin (all night long)/this is the sound of my soul", which was seen as an example of the influence of Gaye's romantic song style. Gaye was also mentioned by name in electro funk outfit R.J.'s Latest Arrival's "Shackles (On My Feet)".

Following Gaye's own death, Lionel Richie composed the song, "Missing You", which he immediately gave to Diana Ross, who was reportedly struggling with her friend's death. The song was released in late 1984 and became Ross' final top-ten single. A day after Gaye's death, new wave band Duran Duran dedicated "Save a Prayer" to Gaye. In 1985, The Commodores issued the ballad, "Nightshift", which was dedicated to both Gaye and Jackie Wilson.

Also in 1984, reggae performer Charlie Chaplin (Richard Patrick Bennett OD) issued "Tribute to Marvin Gaye" on his album "Sound System". It is a lively uptempo reggae song, with lyrics such as "You should never do a thing like that / never take a gun and kill your own son / What a witch, what a wicked and dreadfull bitch", but he also expresses pity for the father: "You would feel much better he were here"... Backing band on the album was Roots Radics.

The alternative band Violent Femmes' song "See My Ships" from their 3 album, referenced Gaye's death in a double-entendre to express anxiety about God (the father)'s final judgment: "Mercy mercy me, Marvin Gaye, he was shot by his father, O my father have mercy on me". Prefab Sprout's "When the Angels" from their album, Steve McQueen, was dedicated to Gaye.

Aaliyah's cover version of "Got to Give It Up" features a rap from Slick Rick, samples Michael Jackson's "Billie Jean", and was included on her 1996 album One in a Million. It was released as the second single in the UK. Aaliyah's version of "Got to Give It Up" failed to chart in the US when it was commercially released there in January 1997 (although it was not sent to radio stations for airplay, a 12-inch vinyl single was released to record stores), but it was a minor hit in the UK peaking at number 37 in the UK Singles Chart. It reached number 34 in New Zealand. The single's B-side, "No Days Go By", was one of Aaliyah's few self-compositions.

A new remix of Aaliyah's "Got to Give It Up" (without Slick Rick's vocals) was included on her posthumous 2002 compilation album I Care 4 U. The video is a re-edit of the original, which was directed by Paul Hunter. The video was edited to both the album version with Slick Rick, and a remix, without Slick Rick's vocals.

In 2003 and 2004, Gaye was often mentioned in songs by rappers such as Jay-Z and T.I. on their respective songs, "Dirt off Your Shoulder" and "Rubber Band Man", while in 2004, the R. Kelly song, "If I Could Make the World Dance" was dedicated to Gaye. That same year, George Michael referenced Marvin's name on his song, "John and Elvis Are Dead" from his Patience album. In 2015, singer Charlie Puth released his first single, "Marvin Gaye", with Meghan Trainor as his duet partner, the song referring to Gaye and his 1973 hit, "Let's Get It On", with the chorus line, let's Marvin Gaye and get it on. Songs that paid tribute or mention reference to Marvin Gaye include:

- "Die a Happy Man" by Thomas Rhett
- "The Introduction" by T.I.
- "True" by Spandau Ballet
- "John the Baptist" by The Afghan Whigs
- "The Day" by They Might Be Giants
- "Shackles" by R.J.'s Latest Arrival
- "Missing You" by Diana Ross
- "Nightshift" by The Commodores
- "When the Angels" by Prefab Sprout
- "I Think We'd Feel Good Together" by Rob Thomas
- "Silky Soul" by Frankie Beverly & Maze
- "Laughing" by The Stranglers
- "My Dear Mr. Gaye" by Teena Marie, recorded for her album, Starchild.
- "Hörst Du mich?" by German Hip Hop band Fettes Brot: its first verse was dedicated to Gaye.
- "The Day Marvin Gaye Died" by The Avett Brothers
- "Club at the End of the Street" by Elton John mentions Marvin.
- "Classic" By MKTO
- "Hurt Me Tomorrow" by K'naan
- "Keep Your Head Up" by 2Pac: the rapper mentions him with the lyric, "I remember Marvin Gaye used to sing to me/he had me feeling like Black was the thing to be."
- Stevie Wonder's "Lighting Up the Candles" was a tribute to Marvin and Stevie first performed it at Gaye's funeral; he later issued the song on his soundtrack to Jungle Fever.
- Israeli artist Izhar Ashdot dedicated his song "Eesh Hashokolad" ("The Chocolate Man", Hebrew: "איש השוקולד") to Gaye.
- Rapper Kanye West referenced Gaye in his song "Slow Jamz" featuring Twista and Jamie Foxx on the 2004 album "The College Dropout".
- Rapper Big Sean recorded a song used on his Finally Famous album titled "Marvin & Chardonnay" featuring Kanye West and Roscoe Dash.
- Rapper Drake recorded "Marvin's Room" in reference to producing the song in Marvin Gaye's studio.
- Rapper Charles Hamilton referenced Marvin in his song "Stay On Your Level".
- Rapper Mos Def's song "Modern Marvel" from his 2004 album The New Danger was dedicated to Marvin.
- Rapper Tyler, The Creator referenced Marvin in his song "Yonkers".
- Rapper Immortal Technique referenced Marvin and "What's Going On" in his song "Crossing the Boundary".
- Rapper B. Dolan referenced Marvin in his song "Marvin (Can't Remember)".
- Rapper Cormega referenced Marvin in his song "Journey".
- Rapper Raekwon's song "Marvin" from his 2017 album "The Wild" is about Gaye's life story.
- Rap/R&B duo NxWorries (Anderson Paak & Knxwledge) referenced Marvin in their song "Suede" on their 2015 EP "Link Up & Suede"
- R&B singer R. Kelly mentions Gaye at the end of "If I Could Make The World Dance" on his 2004 Happy People/U Saved Me album. Kelly states: "Marvin Gaye inspired me to write that one, y'all."
- R&B trio H-Town sang the first part on the line "Listening to some Marvin Gaye" on the first single, "Knockin' Da Boots" from their 1993 debut album, Fever for Da Flavor.
- R&B group The Whispers briefly references Marvin and his hit single Sexual Healing on the single "In the Mood" with the lyric "how about some Marvin Gaye...feel like some sexual healing...."
- Funk Band Vulfpeck referenced Marvin in their song "Captain Hook".
- Hozier's 2018 song, "Nina Cried Power"
- "Marvin Gaye" by Charlie Puth featuring Meghan Trainor, released as a single and peaked at position 25 on the Australian charts in early 2015. Puth and Trainor released the song in tribute to the singer and the soulful quiet storm sound he paved the way for.
- R&B singer Chanti Moore referenced Marvin's song, Flying High in the Friendly Sky, in her song Love's Taken Over.

== Other tributes ==
Marvin's death was referenced in The Sopranos on an episode titled "Members Only", when Uncle Junior shoots Tony Soprano and Vito Spatafore later remarks: "He Marvin Gaye'd his own nephew”. Gaye is referenced as one of the supernatural acts to appear in the short story and later television version of Stephen King's Nightmares and Dreamscapes in "You Know They Got a Hell of a Band".

A play by Caryl Phillips called A Long Way from Home, focusing on Gaye's relationship with his father and his last years in Ostend, was broadcast by BBC Radio 3 in March 2008. It featured O. T. Fagbenle as Gaye and Kerry Shale as Marvin Gay Sr., with Rhea Bailey, Rachel Atkins, Damian Lynch, Alibe Parsons, Ben Onwukwe and Major Wiley. It was directed by Ned Chaillet and produced by Chris Wallis.

In 2010, Marvin's sister Zeola Gaye started producing musical plays titled My Brother, Marvin, in which has been played in several cities. In 2012, a similar titled musical play started playing also in tribute to Gaye.

Rapper Tupac Shakur refers to Marvin Gaye in his song Thugz Mansion: "Seen a show with Marvin Gaye last night, it had me shook."

On November 20, 2018, the United States Postal Service announced that Marvin Gaye would be featured on a first class postage stamp, as part of the Postal Service's Music Icons series (past honorees include Elvis Presley and John Lennon). The postage stamp was issued on Tuesday, April 2nd, 2019, in Los Angeles. Dignitaries who attended the Stamp Issuance Ceremony included Berry Gordy, founder of Motown Records; Mary Wilson, member of The Supremes and program emcee; Smokey Robinson, singer, songwriter and Motown executive; Kadir Nelson, stamp artist and author; and Kenny Lattimore, classical, jazz and gospel singer, as well as Marvin's son Marvin Gaye III, daughter Nona Gaye, sister Zeola Gaye and brother Antwaun Gaye.

== Music videos ==
Year	Video	Director
1986	"Can I Get a Witness"	-
1991	"Mercy Mercy Me (The Ecology)"	-
1994	"Lucky, Lucky Me"	-
1995	"Inner City Blues (Make Me Wanna Holler)"	-
2001	"Music"(with Erick Sermon)	Francis Lawrence
