= Benning Ridge =

Coordinates: 38.8824°N 76.9383°W

- Neighborhood of Washington, D.C.
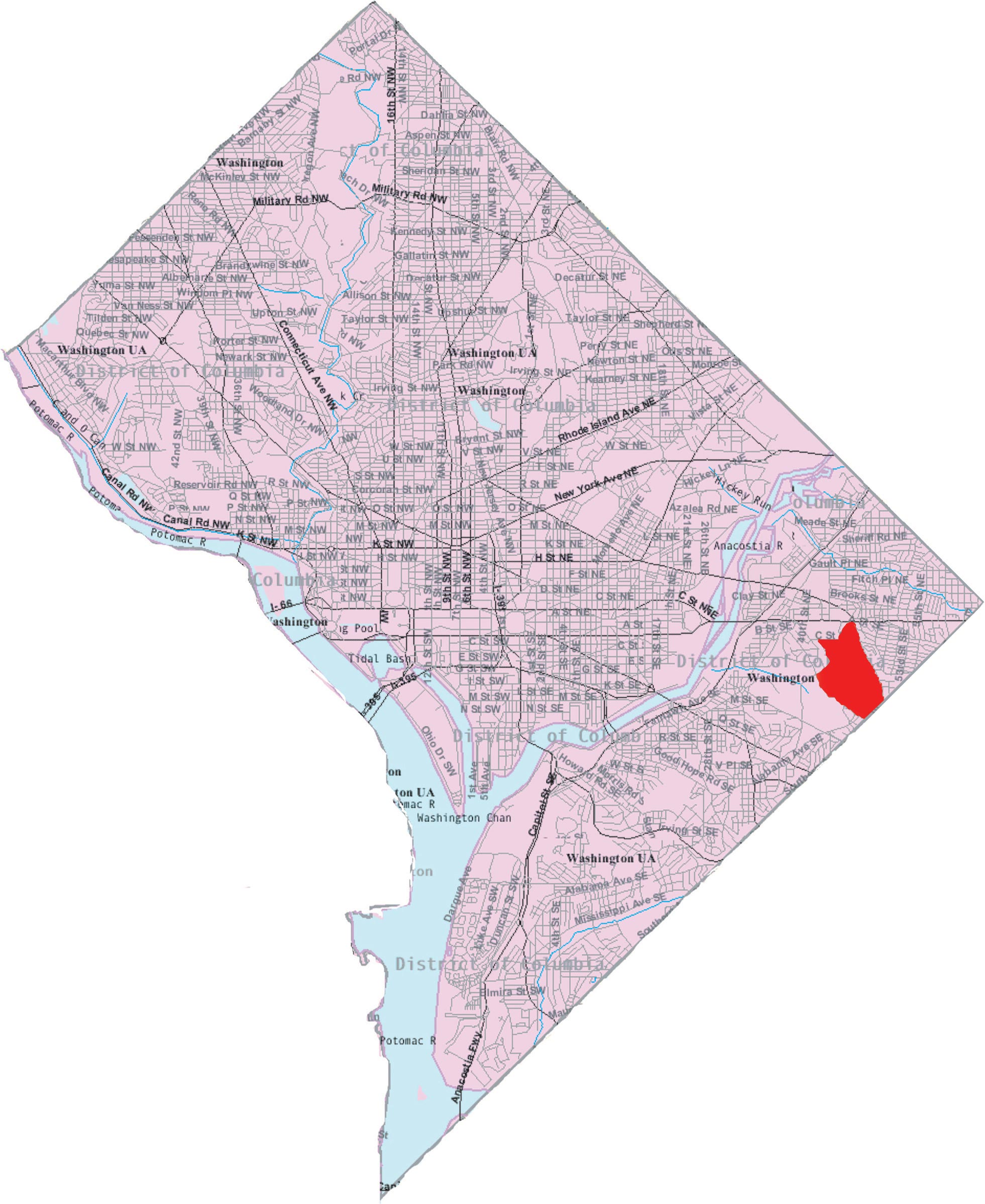
- Benning Ridge within the District of Columbia
- Country: United States
- District: Washington, D.C.
- Ward: Ward 7

Government
  - Councilmember: Wendell Felder

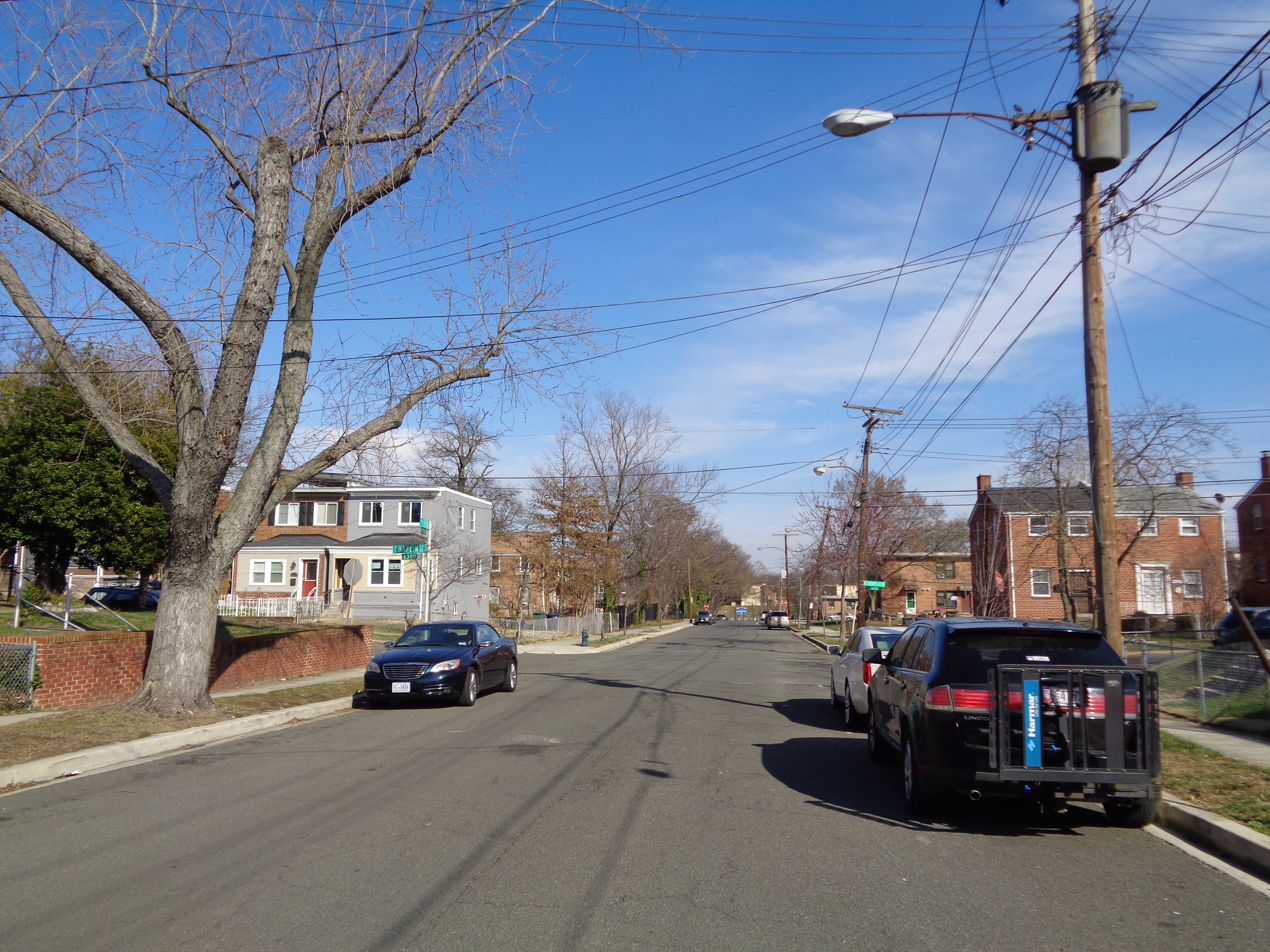
Benning Ridge neighborhood at the intersection of F St and Chaplin St SE

Benning Ridge is a residential neighborhood located in Southeast Washington, D.C. It is bounded by Fort Chaplin Park to the northwest, Southern Avenue to the south, Benning Road to the east, and Ridge Road SE to the west. Benning Ridge is an unusual neighborhood for its location east of the Anacostia River: although it is surrounded by working-class and low-income African American neighborhoods, Benning Ridge is rather affluent, with a diverse population of middle- and upper-middle-class white and black residents. As of 2015 the neighbourhood was one of the top ten most liberal neighbourhoods in Washington D.C.
