= Personal life of Marvin Gaye =

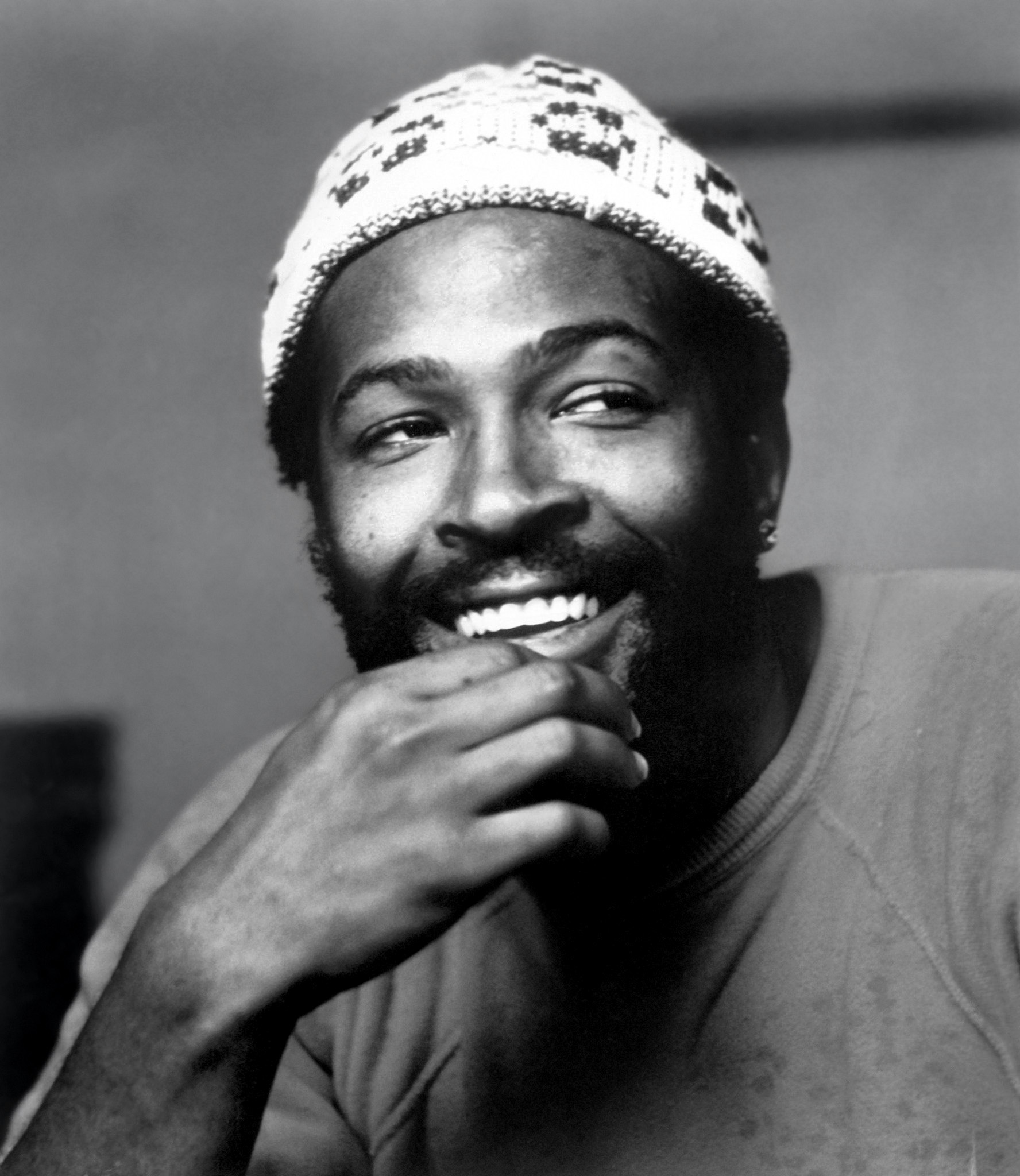
Marvin Gaye in 1973.

Marvin Gaye (1939–1984) had many personal relationships throughout his life. He was married twice and had three children, one he adopted and two biological children. His first marriage to Anna Gordy Gaye inspired many of his early hits, including "Pride and Joy" and "I Heard It Through the Grapevine" as well as the album, Here, My Dear, released a year after their divorce in 1977. His relationship and second marriage to Jan Gaye inspired the later recordings, Let's Get It On and I Want You.

Rumors of liaisons with his Motown duet partners such as Mary Wells, Kim Weston and Tammi Terrell were denied by Gaye and his partners though Gaye admitted to a very close bond with Terrell, whose 1967 stage collapse and subsequent 1970 death from a brain tumor negatively impacted Gaye's life to the point that he was consumed by depression and drug addiction.

Gaye's relationship with his father, Marvin Gay Sr., was reportedly volatile with his father committing child abuse all while being raised under a strict Seventh-day Adventist sect called the House of God. Gaye's faith played heavily into his work with religious themes being heavily explored on his albums,What's Going On and In Our Lifetime. Gaye's relationship with his father later culminated in his murder at his father's hands in 1984.

== Early life, faith and family ==
Gaye and his family were initially raised at the Southwest Waterfront neighborhood of Washington, D.C. until the early 1950s.

Gaye's parents were Marvin Gay Sr. (1914–1998), a storefront minister of a Hebrew Pentecostal church known as the House of God, and Alberta Gay (1913–1987), a schoolteacher and domestic. Gaye's father had moved to Washington, D.C. from Lexington, Kentucky in his late teens while Gaye's mother settled there after having an out-of-wedlock child in Rocky Mount, North Carolina. Both parents were African American.

They married on July 2, 1935. Gaye was the second eldest of the children they would have together, including two sisters Jeanne (1936–2021) and Zeola (b. 1945), a dancer, author and playwright, and younger brother Frankie (1941–2001), a musician and former United States Army veteran. In addition, Gaye was a half-brother of Michael Cooper, Alberta's son from a previous relationship, and Antwaun Carey Gay, Gay Sr.'s youngest child with a mistress.

Michael Cooper was sent to live with Gaye's aunt in Detroit after his father decided not to raise him for being a illegitimate child. In addition, Gaye was a cousin to Wu-Tang Clan founding member Masta Killa.

Gaye, his brother and their two sisters were raised as Seventh-day Adventists and brought up in their father's House of God sect, where their father served as Bishop. The House of God labels itself a "Hebrew Pentecostal" denomination, advocates strict conduct, and claims to adhere to both the Old and New Testaments. Gaye remembered the family having to observe an extended Sabbath starting from "Friday night at sundown" into Saturday—similar to Shabbat in mainstream Judaism.

He later explained, "We kept the Sabbath in the purest sense. Father anointed converts with olive oil and baptized them in the river. The Sabbath was his day, it was God's day, and it was also a day for singing. Every member was blessed with a good voice. The joy of music was the joy of God." Gaye began singing solos during church services at the age of four. At times, Gaye's father would force his children to answer Biblical questions, disciplining them if they answered wrong. His father later quit his ministry when he was unable to secure the highest position of Chief Apostle at the church.

Though Gaye ceased going to church after his teenage years, he remained religiously devout and some teachings from the House of God later influenced his music, including the albums What's Going On, which featured the gospel songs "God is Love" and "Wholy Holy", the latter of which was covered a year later by fellow R&B and soul musician Aretha Franklin on her acclaimed live gospel album, Amazing Grace, and In Our Lifetime, which was a concept album that was based on the belief that the world was facing a possible Armageddon based on a passage from the Biblical chapter of Revelations.

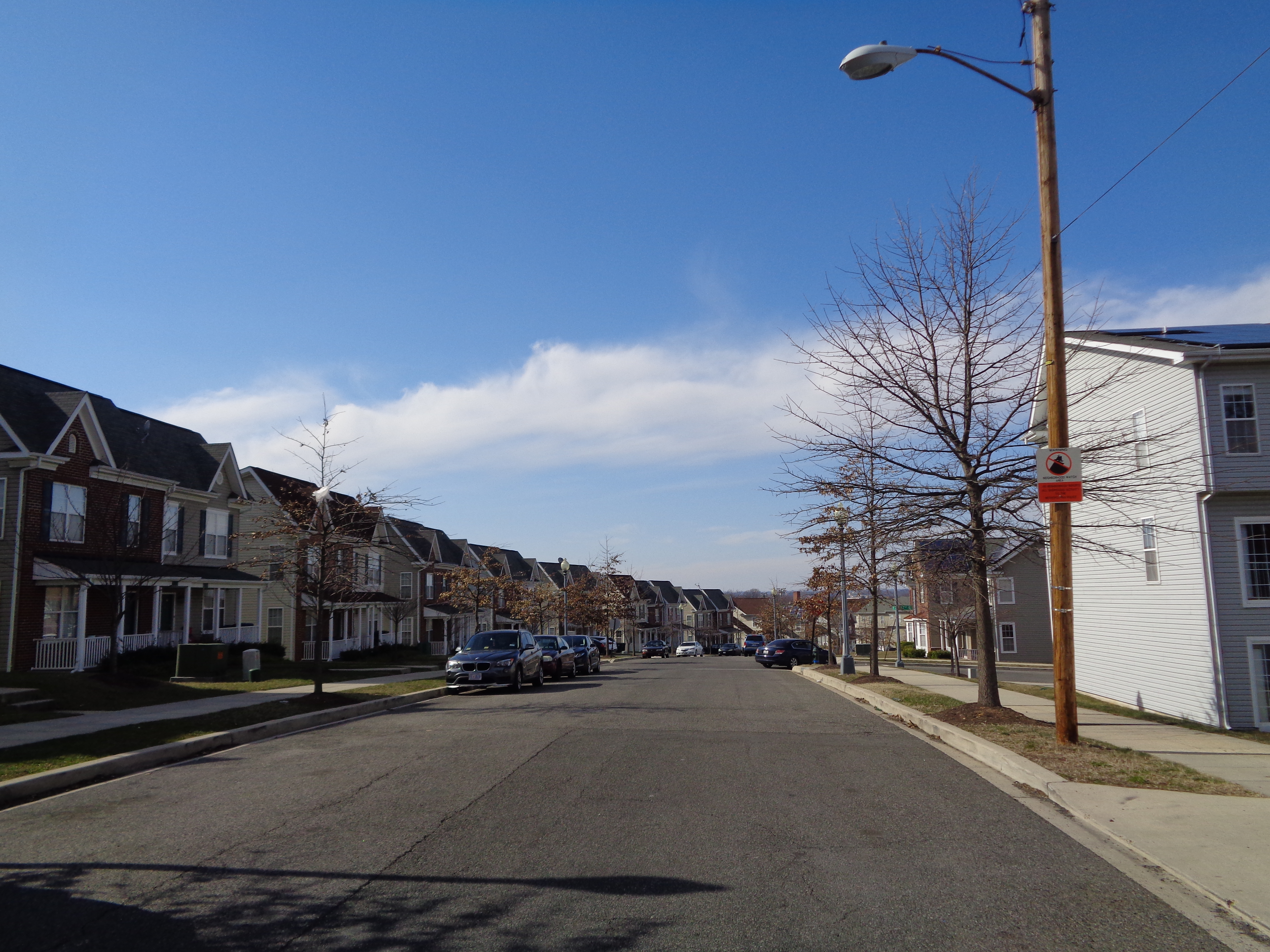
Capitol View, where Gaye spent most of his teenage years at.

The Gay family initially lived at a public housing project, the Fairfax Apartments (now demolished) at 1617 1st Street SW in the Southwest Waterfront neighborhood. Although it was one of the city's oldest neighborhoods, with many elegant Federal-style homes, most buildings were small, in disrepair, and lacking electricity and running water. The alleys were full of one- and two-story shacks, and nearly every dwelling was overcrowded. Gaye and his friends nicknamed the area "Simple City", calling it "half-city, half country".

In 1953 or 1954, (Note: At least once source claims they did not move in until 1955.) the Gays moved into the East Capitol Dwellings public housing project in D.C.'s Capitol View neighborhood. (Note: MacKenzie and a wide range of sources mischaracterize this neighborhood as Deanwood.) Their townhouse apartment (Unit 12, 60th Street NE, now demolished) was Marvin's home until 1962. (Note: Some sources suggest the family first moved to the Benning Ridge neighborhood after leaving Southwest. According to Zeola Gaye and The Washington Post reporter Roger Catlin, the Gay family moved to the Benning Terrace public housing project in the early 1950s. This is not possible, as the Benning Terrace apartments did not begin construction until late 1956, a full year after Marvin Gaye had left home for the military.)

According to Gaye's sister Jeanne, their father never held a job for longer than three years. Gay Sr. worked briefly in the post office and at Western Union, but a back injury laid him off early on the former job and when explaining why he left the latter job, Gay Sr. stated to author David Ritz that people were working on the "day of the Sabbath". To bring in income, Gaye's mother Alberta worked as a domestic worker, cleaning houses in the Maryland and Virginia areas.

Around 1963, after he became a best-selling artist with Motown, Gaye bought his parents an eight-room, two-story residence at D.C.'s Fifteenth and Varnum Street, where they lived until 1975 when the immediate Gaye family moved to Los Angeles. Following the move to the residence on Varnum Street, Alberta Gay retired from domestic work. Gay Sr. later sold the property in October 1982 while his wife was undergoing a life-saving kidney surgery.

Gaye attended Syphax Elementary School and then Randall Junior High School. Gaye began to take singing much more seriously in junior high, and he joined and became a singing star with the Randall Junior High Glee Club. Gaye was encouraged to pursue a music career after a performance at a school play at age 11 when he sang Mario Lanza's "Be My Love".

Gaye briefly attended Spingarn High School before transferring to Cardozo High School. At Cardozo, Gaye joined several doo-wop vocal groups, including the Dippers and the D.C. Tones.

=== Relationship with Marvin Gay Sr. ===
Gaye's relationship with his father was troubled from childhood. According to his sister, Jeanne, Gaye suffered abuse at the hands of his father, who would strike him for any shortcoming, including putting his hairbrush in the wrong place or coming home from school a minute late. Gaye's sister recalled that Gaye would "constantly provoke Father. He disappeared on Saturday mornings when it was time to go to church." Jeanne Gaye explained that, between the ages of 7 and well into his teenage years, Gaye's home life "consisted of a series of brutal whippings."

Gaye explained his father's abuse to author David Ritz years later: "It wasn't simply that my father beat me, though that was bad enough. By the time I was twelve, there wasn't an inch on my body that hadn't been bruised and beaten by him." He stated what made the beatings worse was his father prolonging the time before punishing Gaye, making him remove his clothes and having him hear his father's belt buckle "just loud enough" before he received the punishment. Gaye felt a part of his father was "enjoying the whole thing". Gaye and his siblings suffered from nocturnal enuresis (i.e., bedwetting); more whippings resulted.

Alberta Gay later stated that her husband hated Gaye, as she told David Ritz in 1979:

My husband never wanted Marvin, and he never liked him. He used to say he didn't think he was really his child. I told him that was nonsense. He knew Marvin was his. But for some reason, he didn't love Marvin, and what's worse, he didn't want me to love Marvin either. Marvin wasn't very old before he understood that.

Conversely, Gay Sr. said this about his eldest son:

It was important that I have a male child. A namesake is what I wanted. The day he was born, I felt he was destined for greatness. I thanked God for the blessing of his life. I thanked God for Marvin. I knew he was a special child.

According to Alberta, Gay Sr. began to drink heavily in the 1950s, only furthering the friction in his relationship with the teenage Gaye and, said Alberta, "he never did develop any love for the boy." As a teenager, Gaye was often kicked out of the family home by his father for what Gay Sr. perceived to be "misbehavior".

The beatings and arguments affected Gaye to the point that, whenever he needed to express his need for attention, he would do it through antagonism and projections of violence. Although Gaye would later describe living with his father as "like living with a king, a very peculiar, changeable, cruel and all-powerful king", he embraced the love of his mother, explaining, "If it wasn't for Mother, who was always there to console me and praise me for my singing, I think I would have been one of those child suicide cases you read about in the papers".

Their relationship remained strained throughout Gaye's adulthood. After moving his parents to D.C.'s black middle class Fifteenth and Varnum Street, Gaye would only visit the house if his father wasn't around or if his father made himself scarce. Gaye often told his Motown colleagues that despite buying his father a Cadillac and gifting him a million dollars that his father would still admonish him for "singing the devil's music" and not being a minister.

On May 1, 1972, Gaye returned to D.C. where the city hosted "Marvin Gaye Day" and he was awarded the key to the city and later performed at the Kennedy Center that night, where it would be his father's first time watching him perform professionally. Gaye later told David Ritz that he felt it was the first time he "made [his] father proud". Frankie Gaye, Marvin's brother, confirmed it saying their father told Gaye he was "proud of him"

In the days leading up to his death in 1984, Gaye told a friend that his father briefly nursed him with his hands in his bedroom after complaining of his back being sore, which startled Gaye, who had been used to his mother Alberta doing it. The friend reminded him, "see? Your father loves you, man."

== Air Force tenure ==
In October 1956, a 17-year-old Gaye ran away from home and dropped out of Cardozo to enlist in the United States Air Force. Sent to bases in states such as Kansas, Texas, and Wyoming, Gaye quickly grew tired of having to do menial tasks and began rebelling against the sergeant's strict orders. Eventually, Gaye told officers he had a mental illness and was honorably discharged shortly afterward in June 1957 just eight months after enlisting.

Before leaving the Air Force, Gaye lost his virginity to a prostitute. Gaye explained the experience as "freaky" and started an obsession with what he liked to call "love for sale". Gaye noted he saw "a world of pure sex where people turned off their minds and fed their lusts, no questions asked. The concept sickened me, but I also found it exciting." Upon his exit from the Air Force, his sergeant stated that Gaye refused to follow orders.

== Marriages ==
=== Anna Gordy Gaye ===
Gaye first met Anna Ruby Gordy (January 28, 1922 – January 31, 2014), 17 years his senior, while Gaye was a staff drummer for the label Anna Records around 1960. It started with Gaye flirting with her to get her attention. According to Gaye's brother Frankie, the couple began living together at her apartment after just two months of meeting each other. After a two-year courtship, the couple married on June 8, 1963, in Detroit.

During Gaye's early years in Motown, he was inspired by his relationship with his wife, often writing songs dedicated to her, including his 1963 top ten hit, "Pride and Joy". Of that song, Gaye later told David Ritz, "When I composed 'Pride and Joy', I was head over heels in love with Anna. I just wrote what I felt about her, and what she did for me. She was my pride and joy."

The marriage was reportedly volatile and, according to Gaye's biographer David Ritz, Anna was physically and verbally abusive to her younger husband. By the turn of the 1970s, Gaye had begun to counter his wife's attacks. Rumors of infidelity also deeply soured the marriage and later influenced Gaye's late 1960s recordings, including his 1968 number one hit, "I Heard It Through the Grapevine". According to Gaye's brother, he caught Anna cheating on him at a Detroit motel.

Gordy Gaye, like many members of her family, got involved in the record business, forming Anna Records, the label that nationally distributed Barrett Strong's hit "Money (That's What I Want)" through Chess Records. During her marriage to Gaye, Gordy Gaye composed Stevie Wonder's 1967 Christmas anthem "That's What Christmas Means to Me". She also co-composed the hits "Baby I'm for Real" and "The Bells" for The Originals, with Gaye. The couple also co-wrote "God is Love" and "Just to Keep You Satisfied", which were respectively featured on What's Going On and Let's Get It On.

By 1973, following Gaye's legal separation from Gordy, Gaye rewrote the lyrics to "Just to Keep You Satisfied" changing it from a romantic ode to an emotional ballad documenting the end of their marriage. The couple relocated to Los Angeles in late 1972 and Gaye filed for legal separation in the winter of 1973, shortly before Gaye met Janis Hunter. In November 1975, Gordy filed for divorce. A contentious divorce case followed for a year and a half before it was finalized on May 4, 1977.

In the divorce decree, Gaye agreed to remit a portion of his royalties to go to Gordy for his next album. That album, Here, My Dear, was released to dismal sales in December 1978. Despite being so hurt by the album that she considered filing a privacy lawsuit in 1979, Anna eventually forgave Marvin and the former couple would maintain a close friendship until Marvin's untimely death.

=== Jan Gaye ===
Gaye met 17-year-old Janis "Jan" Hunter (January 5, 1956 - December 3, 2022) in 1973, while working on his Let's Get It On album with producer Ed Townsend. Hunter was the child of American jazz musician Slim Gaillard. Barbara Hunter, Hunter's mother and a friend of Townsend's, arrived in the studio with Hunter on March 22, 1973. Hunter's presence served as inspiration for Gaye during the making of the album. After their first date, Gaye was inspired to record the composition, "If I Should Die Tonight".

The couple later moved in together, first to Gaye's one-room apartment outside Hollywood and then at Topanga Canyon. During Gaye's 1974 concert tour, he performed the ballad "Jan" to his new love. Hunter first received public notice when she was featured with Marvin on a November 1974 issue of Ebony. According to David Ritz, Jan Gaye helped to assemble Gaye's iconic 1974 Oakland concert outfit of his "red watch cap, beaded denim shirt and silver red-laced platform boots". Jan insisted on doing it to ease Gaye's anxiety over the Oakland concert.

After Gaye's divorce to Gordy was finalized, Gaye married Hunter on October 10, 1977, in New Orleans. It was alleged Gaye married her due to concurrent tax issues, but Jan Gaye would contend they married after surviving a car accident. Jan Gaye later stated the singer sometimes coerced her into having sexual relationships with other men, most notably fellow R&B musicians such as Frankie Beverly and Teddy Pendergrass. The contents of Gaye's 1976 album, I Want You, was heavily inspired by Gaye and Hunter's torrid affair. Author Michael Eric Dyson stated that their relationship in inspiration to the creation of I Want You was "nearly palpable in the sensual textures that are the album's aural and lyrical signature".

Their open marriage, domestic abuse and drug dependence became disastrous and Jan Gaye filed for legal separation in 1979. She later admitted she went "back and forth across the ocean, around and around, just chasing this relationship that never worked, but I wasn't willing to give up and neither was he."

Gaye and Jan tried numerous attempts at reconciliation that ended sourly, including one night in Hawaii around 1979 when Gaye, high on cocaine and mushrooms, attempted to kill Jan after hearing of her continuing affair with Teddy Pendergrass. Even after divorcing in November 1982, the couple made one last ditch attempt at a romantic reconciliation that ended during Gaye's final tour in 1983 due to the singer's increased paranoia from his drug use. Afterwards, the couple kept in touch by phone until Gaye's death.

Jan Gaye released her memoir on her life and times with Gaye titled After the Dance: My Life with Marvin Gaye in 2015. That year, she told journalist Susan Whitall of The Detroit News of her relationship with Gaye after being disappointed of tabloid media only printing negative tidbits about their relationship, "...from 17 to 28, regardless of all the fights that we had, the lies that we told, and things that we did, there was always an element of love..." and that Gaye was "the love of my life."

Jan Gaye died on December 3, 2022, at her home in Rhode Island, at the age of 66 from undisclosed reasons.

== Children ==
Gaye had three children during his lifetime. The birth of his first and only child with his first wife Anna has produced rumors and speculation over his conception. Born on November 17, 1965, to Denise Gordy, Marvin Gaye III was subsequently adopted by Marvin and Anna where he was given his name and christened at Detroit's Bethel AME Church. Prior to Gaye III's arrival, Anna and Marvin staged a fake pregnancy since Anna was unable to naturally conceive a child. When author David Ritz wondered why despite Gaye's acrimonious relationship with his father did he give him the name of Marvin III, Gaye explained he did so "to keep up with tradition". Gaye and his wife had hoped a child would improve their volatile marriage.

Though Denise Gordy, who was sixteen at the time of Gaye III's birth, admitted to being his biological mother, speculation over Gaye being the biological father persisted and was later brought up in several Gaye biographies though never confirmed. Gaye first brought up adopting Gaye III to Ritz around the early 1980s. Gaye III had a close relationship with his father, who died when Gaye III was barely 18. Since his father didn't have a will, Gaye III became one of his estate's co-executors. In 1987, three years after his father's death, he and his adopted mother Anna accepted Gaye's induction into the Rock and Roll Hall of Fame. Since the 1980s, Gaye III has attempted to follow in the musical footsteps of his father; at one point, he and Lou Rawls Jr., the late son of fellow soul singer Lou Rawls, attempted a career as a musical duo.

In 2013, Gaye III made headlines after he and his siblings along with Jan Gaye sued Robin Thicke and producer Pharrell Williams over the hit single "Blurred Lines", which they claimed copied elements and "the feel" of Gaye's 1977 hit, "Got to Give It Up", which was later ruled in their favor. Gaye III gave interviews during this period where he asked for himself and his younger siblings to be compensated for the song.

That same year, his attorney announced that Gaye III was suffering from renal failure and was seeking a donor for a kidney transplant, eventually getting one when a radio deejay, Rick Greene, offered him one. The procedure was successfully performed in 2014. Also in 2013, Gaye released the EDM song, "Can't Take My Eyes Off You", and produced a music video of the song, featuring his then-wife Wendy Gaye, with whom he married in March 2010. Both the song and video went viral six years later with many negative reactions toward the song, Gaye III's voice and the video.

Gaye III made headlines in January 2023 when he was arrested on a misdemeanor domestic violence charge after an alleged physical altercation with his wife Wendy and her cousin, charges which Gaye denied. In 2024, Gaye III and Wendy Gaye were officially divorced. Gaye III is the father of two sons. His eldest, Marvin IV, was born on the eleventh anniversary of his grandfather's death on April 1, 1995. He was followed by Dylan Gaye in 2000. Both sons were born to two different mothers.

With his second wife Jan, Gaye had two children. His only daughter, Nona Aisha Gaye, was born on September 4, 1974, in Los Angeles. (Note: During her early career, Nona and Jan claimed that she had been born in Washington, D.C. and had stayed there for three weeks. However, Jan later confirmed that Nona was born in Los Angeles.) She was quickly followed by the birth of Frankie Christian Gaye on November 16, 1975. Frankie Christian, nicknamed Bubby by his parents, was named after his uncle Frankie and was delivered in between his uncle's birthday and his eldest brother's. During his parents' separation, Gaye managed to take their son Bubby from Janis with help from his youngest sister Zeola. Bubby then lived with his father during his European exile in London and Belgium before eventually reuniting with his mother. Little is known of Bubby Gaye besides him joining his siblings and mother in the case against Robin Thicke and Pharrell Williams for allegedly copying his father's music. He currently resides in Rhode Island where his mother was living prior to her death.

Much like her elder brother, Nona also followed her father into a show business career, where Nona became a musician and critically acclaimed actress, finding success in for her roles in Ali, The Matrix Reloaded and The Matrix Revolutions. Nona Gaye also had a personal and professional relationship with American musician Prince between 1993 and 1996. In 1997, her relationship with Justin Martinez produced a son, Nolan Pentz Martinez.

== Other relationships ==
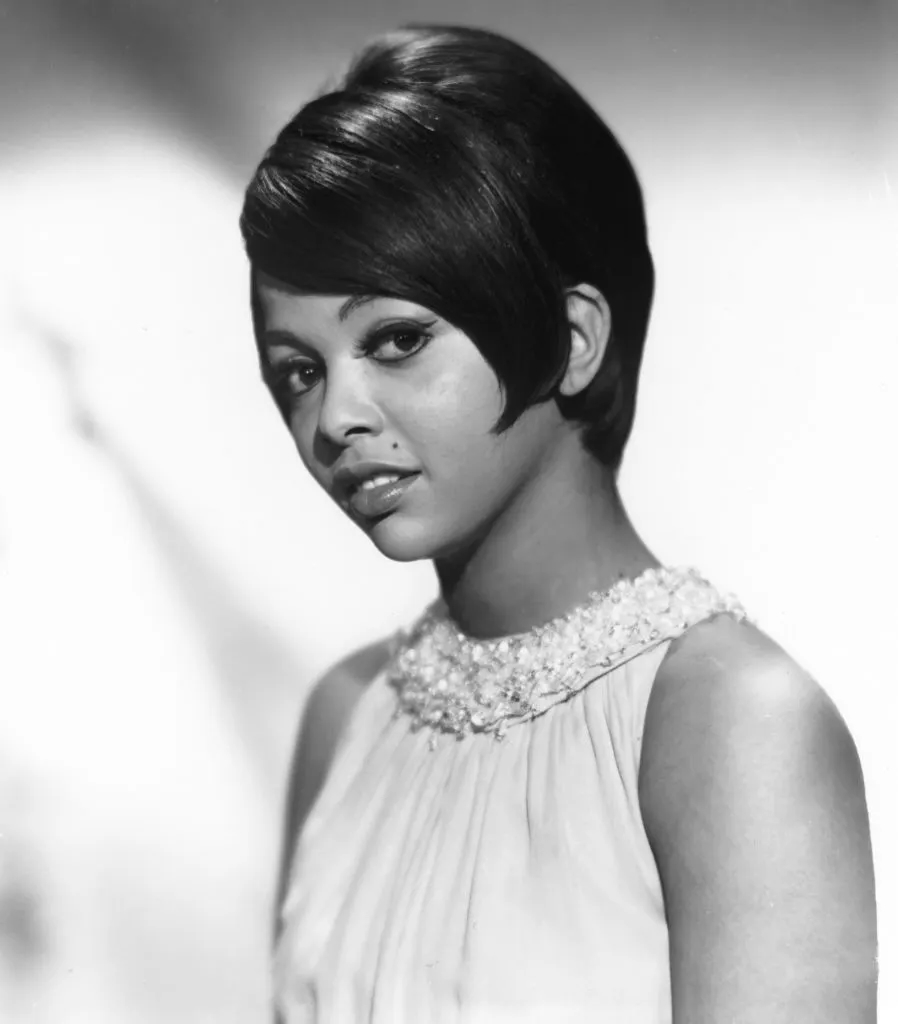
Though rumors persisted, Gaye never had a romantic liaison with his famed duet partner Tammi Terrell with whom he had a close platonic friendship.

During his tenure with Harvey & the New Moonglows, Gaye was involved with a stripper named Titty Tassel Toni, with whom Gaye later claimed turned him onto marijuana.

A Guardian article shortly after the death of American singer Aretha Franklin in 2018 claimed Franklin's elder sister, fellow American singer Erma Franklin, dated Gaye shortly after the singer relocated to Detroit in the early 1960s.

During his early years at Motown, rumors speculated that Gaye had romantic liaisons with his singing partners but were proven to be false. Singer Mary Wells was Gaye's first singing partner, having recorded the hit album, Together. Wells and Gaye both denied romantic ties to the other. Later duet partner Kim Weston, with whom Gaye recorded the hit, "It Takes Two", stated their own relationship was "strictly platonic."

The same was said of Gaye's relationship with his most successful duet partner Tammi Terrell, with whom Gaye collaborated with on the hit singles "Ain't No Mountain High Enough", "Ain't Nothing Like the Real Thing" and "You're All I Need to Get By". The two forged on a close friendship throughout Terrell's lifetime. Gaye was deeply devastated following Terrell's collapse at a concert in Virginia where they were performing in 1967. Terrell's later diagnosis and death from a brain tumor would help to send Gaye to a depression.

Gaye was the only notable Motown artist allowed at Terrell's Philadelphia funeral, as the singer's mother felt Gaye was her only close friend. An emotionally shaken and distraught Gaye delivered a tearful eulogy as the music of "You're All I Need to Get By" played in the background. Gaye later paid tribute to Terrell with performing medleys of their hits on his concert tours, sometimes singing solo and sometimes with other female singers.

Gaye often blamed himself for Terrell's illness and death, despite the fact that Terrell's tumor may have developed since her early childhood. Gaye's devastation over Terrell's death fueled his cocaine addiction.

Following Gaye's separation from Jan Gaye, the musician began dating Dutch-based model Eugenie Vis for two years. Gaye was also involved with British socialite Lady Edith Foxwell (1918–1996) during the early 1980s. At one point, according to author Bernard J. Taylor, Foxwell explained that her and Gaye's relationship became serious enough to consider marriage by 1982.

Gaye's final girlfriend was an Englishwoman named Deborah Derrick. In 1984, Derrick told Parade magazine that she carried Gaye's unborn child during Gaye's final year alive. When family tension became too much, Gaye moved her to an apartment in West Hollywood. Derrick later miscarried Gaye's child after moving back to London.

=== Alleged affair with Marlon Brando ===
In 2018, producer Quincy Jones claimed Gaye had been sexually involved with actor Marlon Brando, an allegation that was quickly denied by Gaye's surviving family members.

Gaye's sister Zeola called Jones "wicked and vindictive" following his allegations, while Gaye's eldest son Marvin III stated that his father "didn't have anything against homosexuals" and that Gaye was a "ladies' man". Jones later apologized for his comments, calling it "word vomit".

== Friendships ==
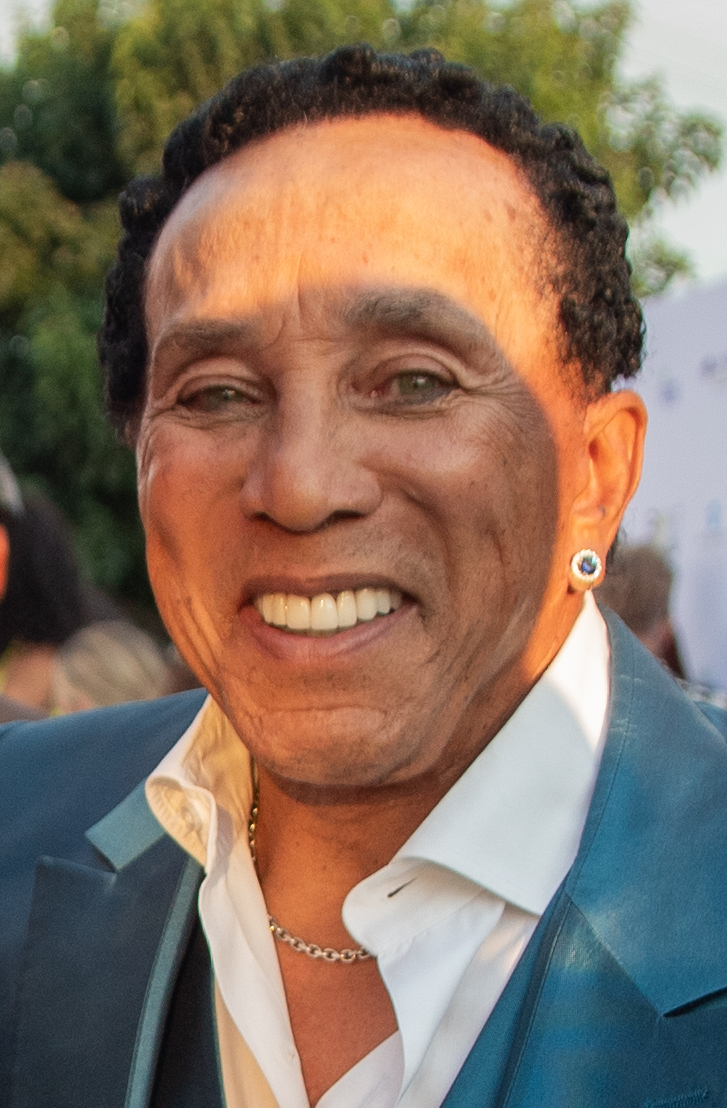
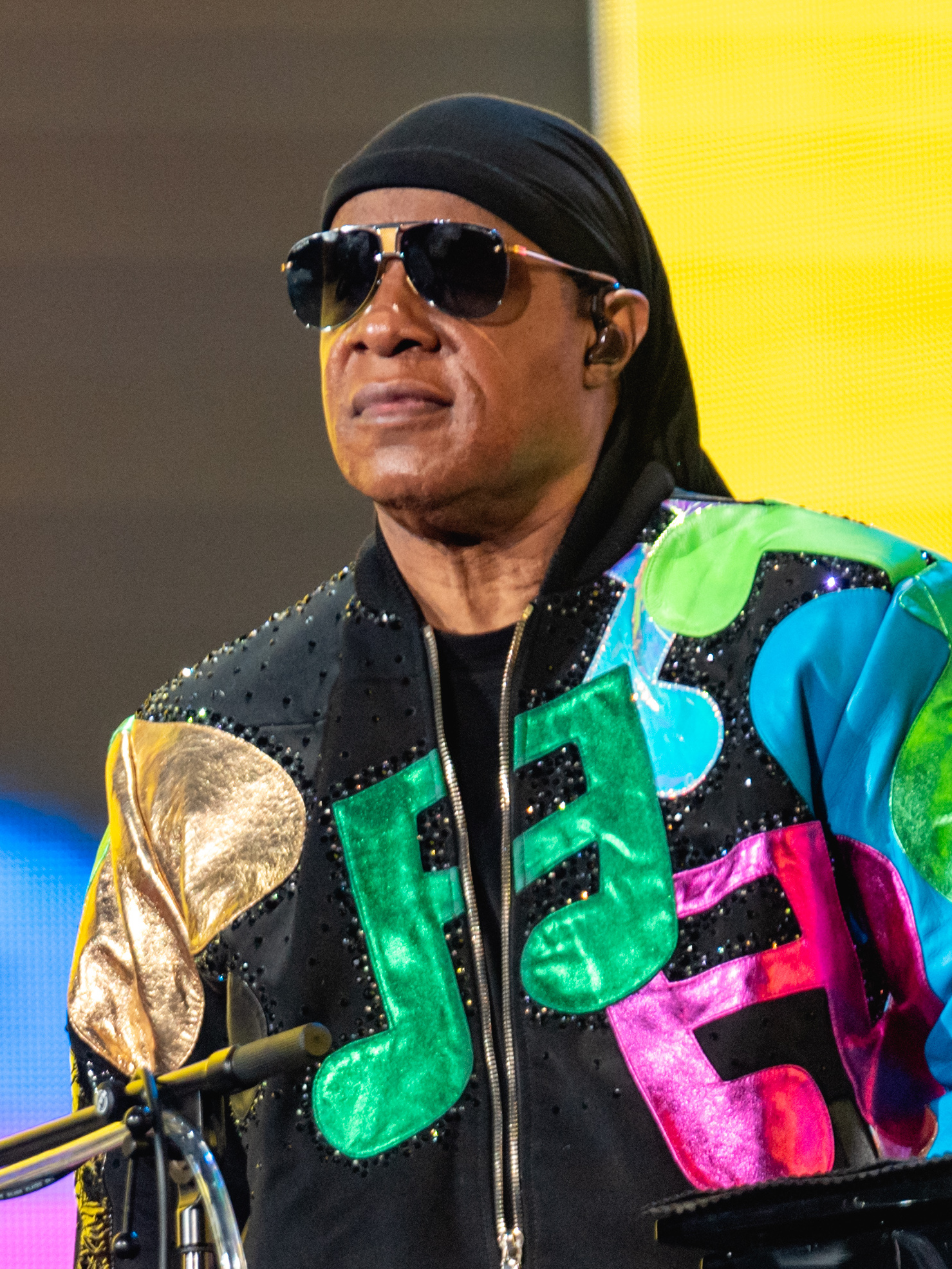
Fellow Motown artists Smokey Robinson and Stevie Wonder were among Gaye’s best friends.

Gaye had several friends and colleagues throughout his career. One of his first friends while entering the industry was American singer Harvey Fuqua, co-founder of the Moonglows, an R&B and doo-wop group Gaye constantly listened to as a teenager. Following a brief tenure with Bo Diddley while a member of the Marquees, Fuqua took the group under his wing and made them into a Moonglows spinoff group called "Harvey and the New Moonglows". Despite not making him the official lead singer of the group, Fuqua still took more interest in Gaye than other group members. Fuqua would be Gaye's ultimate mentor throughout Gaye's career.

In 1960, Fuqua split the group up and kept Gaye with him where the two men resettled at Detroit. During this era, the two men got romantically involved with the female members of the Gordy family Gwen and Anna respectively, eventually marrying the women. Gaye's relationship with Fuqua soured a little after Gaye learned that Fuqua sold half his interest in Gaye to Berry Gordy. Nonetheless, Gaye signed with Gordy's Tamla label in September 1960.

Fuqua produced hit songs for Gaye while at Motown, most notably with Tammi Terrell, with whom he had the idea to pair Gaye with after Kim Weston, a previous duet partner, left Motown. Gaye reached out to Fuqua in 1982 after he left Motown and signed with Columbia Records. With Fuqua's help, Gaye released his final album, Midnight Love.

During his years at Motown, besides Fuqua, Gaye's closest relationships were with staff composers William "Mickey" Stevenson, Clarence Paul and Beans Bowles, label mates Smokey Robinson and Stevie Wonder, and duet partners Tammi Terrell and Kim Weston. He also was close to Martha Reeves of Martha and the Vandellas.

Robinson and Wonder in particular worked with Gaye in various stages of their careers, with Robinson co-composing Gaye's 1965 hits "I'll Be Doggone" and "Ain't That Peculiar" while Wonder helped to compose "You're the One for Me" on Gaye's 1966 album, Moods of Marvin Gaye. Gaye had played drums on Wonder's early works and taught the youngster how to properly play drums. Wonder later credited Gaye for helping him to compose more political music following the release of What's Going On. At Gaye's funeral, Wonder performed the ballad "Lighting Up the Candles", which he had written for the occasion. Wonder later included a studio recording of the tribute song on his soundtrack to the 1991 film, Jungle Fever. Robinson said of his friendship with Gaye in 2023, "Marvin and I were brothers, man. We hung out almost every day of our lives." Robinson spoke at Gaye's funeral.

Gaye was also friends with Diana Ross, though the two artists reportedly clashed during the recording of their duet album, Diana & Marvin. Nonetheless, following Gaye's death, Ross recorded the ballad, "Missing You", written for Gaye by Lionel Richie, for her album, Swept Away (1984). Upon its release, it became her final top ten single in the United States.

Gaye also had a close but stormy relationship with Berry Gordy. They became brothers-in-law shortly after Gaye married Gordy's sister Anna in 1963. According to Motown biographers, the two clashed over musical control. Following the assassination of President John F. Kennedy in November 1963, Gaye reportedly started an argument with Gordy at his Hitsville office due to the lack of support he felt his hit single "Can I Get a Witness" was receiving, compared to other artists' singles released around that time. The argument turned volatile until Gordy barked, "don't you realize that the president was killed today?"

In 1967, the two argued over control over a studio recording of Gaye's performance at the Copacabana as Gaye wanted to produce the project, which Gordy refused. As a result, the album was shelved for nearly 40 years. In 1970, Gaye famously threatened to retire from recording music if Gordy didn't allow him to release the single, "What's Going On".

Despite their sometimes vitriolic relationship, Gordy and Gaye maintained a friendship even after Gaye divorced Anna in 1977 and his exit from Motown in 1982 following the ill-fated release of Gaye's In Our Lifetime. Gaye agreed at the last minute to perform on Motown 25: Yesterday, Today, Forever in 1983 to honor the Motown founder and was seen hugging and embracing Gordy near the end of the televised special. When Gaye died in 1984, Gordy put out a public statement calling Gaye "the greatest of his time" and compared his artistry to that of Billie Holiday's.

In between trying out for the Detroit Lions and recording the song "What's Going On", Gaye befriended the team's players Mel Farr and Lem Barney. Farr and Barney provided harmony background vocals to the song. After the song became a hit, Gaye presented the players gold records for their participation in the song.

Gaye also befriended American comedians Richard Pryor and Dick Gregory. Gregory later attended Gaye's funeral in April 1984 and delivered the eulogy at the service.

== Sexuality and identity ==
Due to his upbringing, some speculated Gaye's sexuality as early as adolescence. The singer claimed he first witnessed his father dressing in his mother's clothes around the age of twelve. Gaye's mother later confirmed that her husband was a crossdresser. Despite rumors, Gaye's father was heterosexual.

Due to this as well as their soft-spoken voice and sensitivities, both Marvin and his younger brother Frankie were constantly teased about their father and their last name. The brothers often found themselves verbally defending their father and religion, which residents also found "weird".

During his adolescence, residents and schoolmates made homophobic jokes at his expense, sometimes adding "is" in front of his name, something that continued as Gaye developed his music career. Beans Bowles nicknamed him "Gayesky", which Gaye didn't like.

Gaye added an "e" to his surname prior to the release of his first official single, "Let Your Conscience Be Your Guide".

Gaye identified as heterosexual throughout his life but admitted to David Ritz that like his father, he sometimes wore women's clothing.

== Residences ==
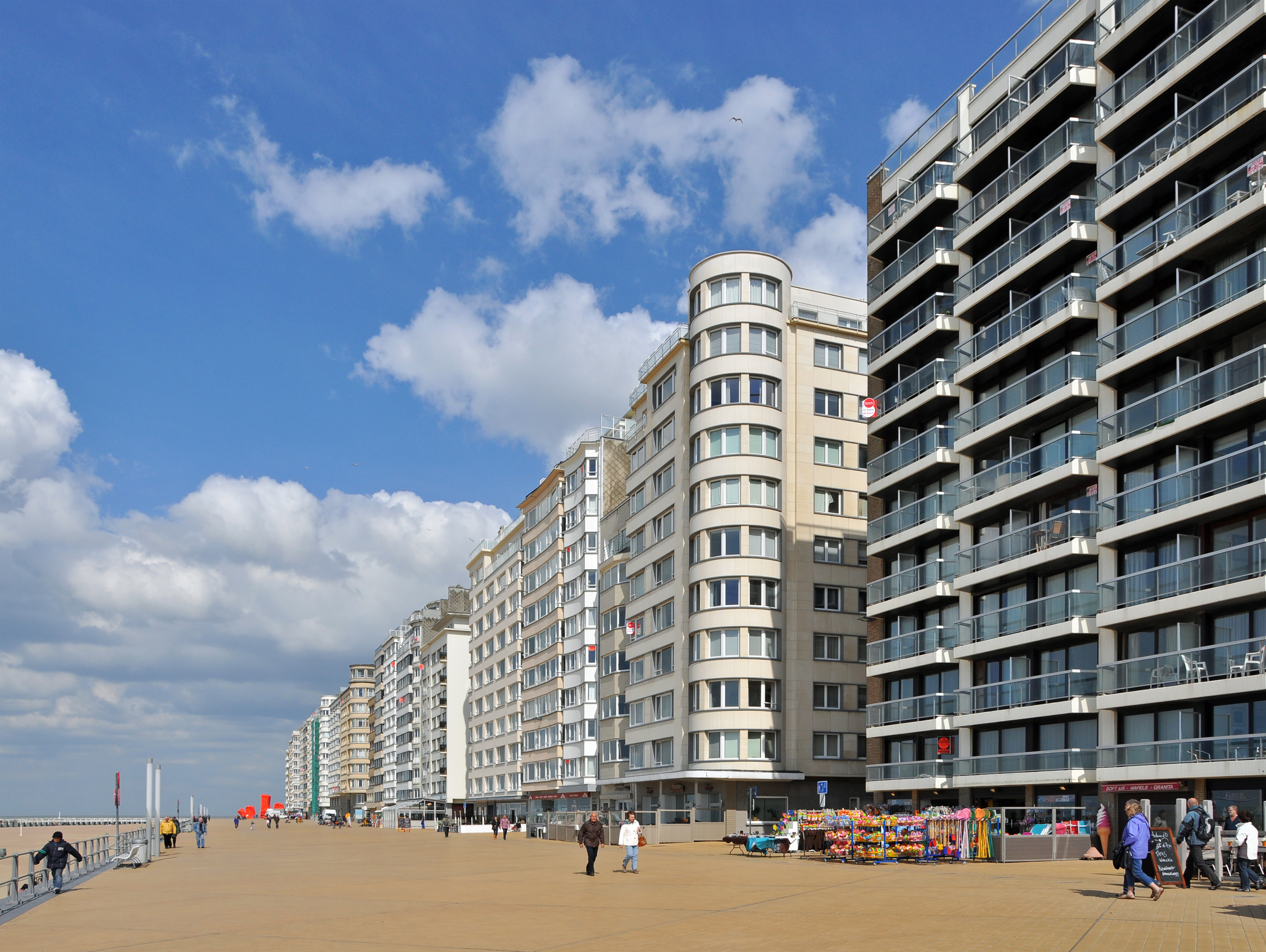
Gaye lived in a rented apartment at the Albert-I Promenade in Ostend, Belgium, during his early 1980s exile.

During his lifetime, Gaye owned several homes. Following their 1963 nuptials, Marvin and Anna lived at a home at Detroit's Appoline Street, which was only eight blocks away from Motown's Hitsville studio, living there until 1967. From 1967 to 1972, Gaye and his family lived in a comfortable house near Detroit's Outer Drive; the home was once owned by Berry Gordy. Gaye shot his famous cover for the What's Going On album in the backyard of the property. In 2021, the street where the house was located was renamed to Marvin Gaye Drive.

Gaye and his family moved to Los Angeles in the summer of 1972, settling at a home in the Hollywood Hills. After separating from his first wife, he bought a one-bedroom apartment in Culver City, California where he lived for a year. In late 1973, Gaye and then live-in girlfriend Jan settled at a home in Topanga, California. Gaye picked the location to get away from the Hollywood nightlife and his label's demands, according to Jan.

Gaye's Topanga residence, described as a "rustic cabin", was so "high up in the twisting and turning hills of Skyhawk Lane that friends had to call from a gas station below to have someone escort them up." After a robbery occurred there, they moved to a mansion in Hidden Hills in 1975. That same year, he moved his parents to a home he bought specifically for them at the West Adams district of Western Heights, Los Angeles.

After purchasing what became Marvin's Room in Sunset Boulevard, Gaye made the building into his own recording studio, apartment complex, and nightclub. An article on Mix Online described the nightclub portion of the building as the "Studio 54 of the West Coast", with celebrities, athletes and politicians all being in attendance, including Diana Ross and Muhammad Ali. There, the singer made many of his late Motown-era recordings such as I Want You and Here, My Dear, as well as the disco-funk hit "Got to Give It Up", before the building was put on foreclosure following the singer filing for bankruptcy in October 1978.

During his prolonged stay in Ostend, Gaye lived at a seafront apartment at Residence Jane on the Albert-I Promenade 77 where he wrote "Sexual Healing". By 1982, he had moved to a 21-room villa called "The White House" just outside Ostend before returning to the United States.

In 1983, Gaye rented a mansion in Sherman Oaks, but due to his increasing debt and drug issues, he soon returned to his parents' property in West Adams, Los Angeles.

== Substance use ==
Gaye's drug of choice in his early adulthood was marijuana, having been introduced to the drug, reportedly by his girlfriend Titty Tassel Toni around 1959 or 1960 when Gaye toured the chitlin' circuit with Harvey and the Moonglows. The singer remained a heavy user of the drug throughout his life and openly spoke of smoking the drug to Rolling Stone in 1972.

During his Moonglows tenure, the group, along with original member and lead singer Bobby Lester, were busted for drugs in Beaumont, Texas while en route to a gig in Corpus Christi. Though all members were sent to jail, all except Lester, were allowed to post bond where they paid a fine for vagrancy.

Gaye was first introduced to cocaine not long after signing with Motown in the early 1960s. At first, the singer had issues snorting, so he would use it by either rubbing it on his gums or eating it. By 1970, having been affected by the death of singing partner Tammi Terrell, Gaye's dependence on the drug had become an addiction. His acclaimed album, What's Going On, addressed drug use in the song "Flyin' High (in the Friendly Sky)".

Gaye often snorted cocaine to get through bouts of stage fright prior to concert performances, which made his addiction worse. By 1980, having resettled at London following the end of a European tour, Gaye began freebasing the drug.

The singer's cocaine addiction saw a reprieve when he moved to Ostend under the watchful eye of Freddy Cousaert. While in Ostend, Gaye returned to exercising and boxing at a local gym, attending church and partaking in Belgian culture. Gaye occasionally would use a "temple ball", according to Jan Gaye, which she described to be a "mixture of hashish, opium marbling and cocaine". Gaye stopped using it after Jan fell unconscious from the temple ball during a ferry ride in Brussels.

Gaye began freebasing again following his return to the United States in October 1982. By the time his Sexual Healing Tour opened in San Diego, California, he also had begun using PCP, also referred to as "angel dust", a dissociative anesthetic mainly used recreationally for its significant mind-altering effects, which can cause hallucinations, distorted perceptions of sounds, and violent behavior. The drugs led to increasing paranoia. During his final tour, he wore a bullet-proof vest and brought along bodyguards with loaded pistols because he feared for his life, as he was convinced that someone was plotting to kill him.

When an autopsy was done on Gaye following his murder, they found minor traces of cocaine in his system. Judge Ronald George believed that PCP was also present in Gaye's system due to Gaye's state of mind in the days leading up to his death, but this was due to a misreading of the coroner's report.

== Suicide attempts ==
Gaye attempted suicide at least three times. The first occurred in 1970 when he was holed up at a Detroit apartment. Gaye, despondent from his failing marriage at the time combined with depression over duet partner Tammi Terrell's death from a brain tumor, sought to shoot himself with a handgun. Berry Gordy's father, "Pops", eventually stopped this attempt. In 1979, while in Maui, Gaye ingested one ounce (28 g) of cocaine in a second suicide attempt. Gaye explained later, "I'd given up. The problems were too big for me. I just wanted to be left alone and blow my brains on high-octane toot. It would be a slow but relatively pleasant death, certainly less messy than a gun."

Four days before his death, according to his sister Jeanne, Gaye again attempted suicide by jumping out of a speeding sports car, only to suffer minor bruises. In an interview a year before his death in 1984, he explained his bouts with depression, stating that during his exile, he was "a manic-depressive. I was at my lowest ebb. I really didn't feel like I was loved. Because I didn't feel love, I felt useless."

== Death and funeral ==
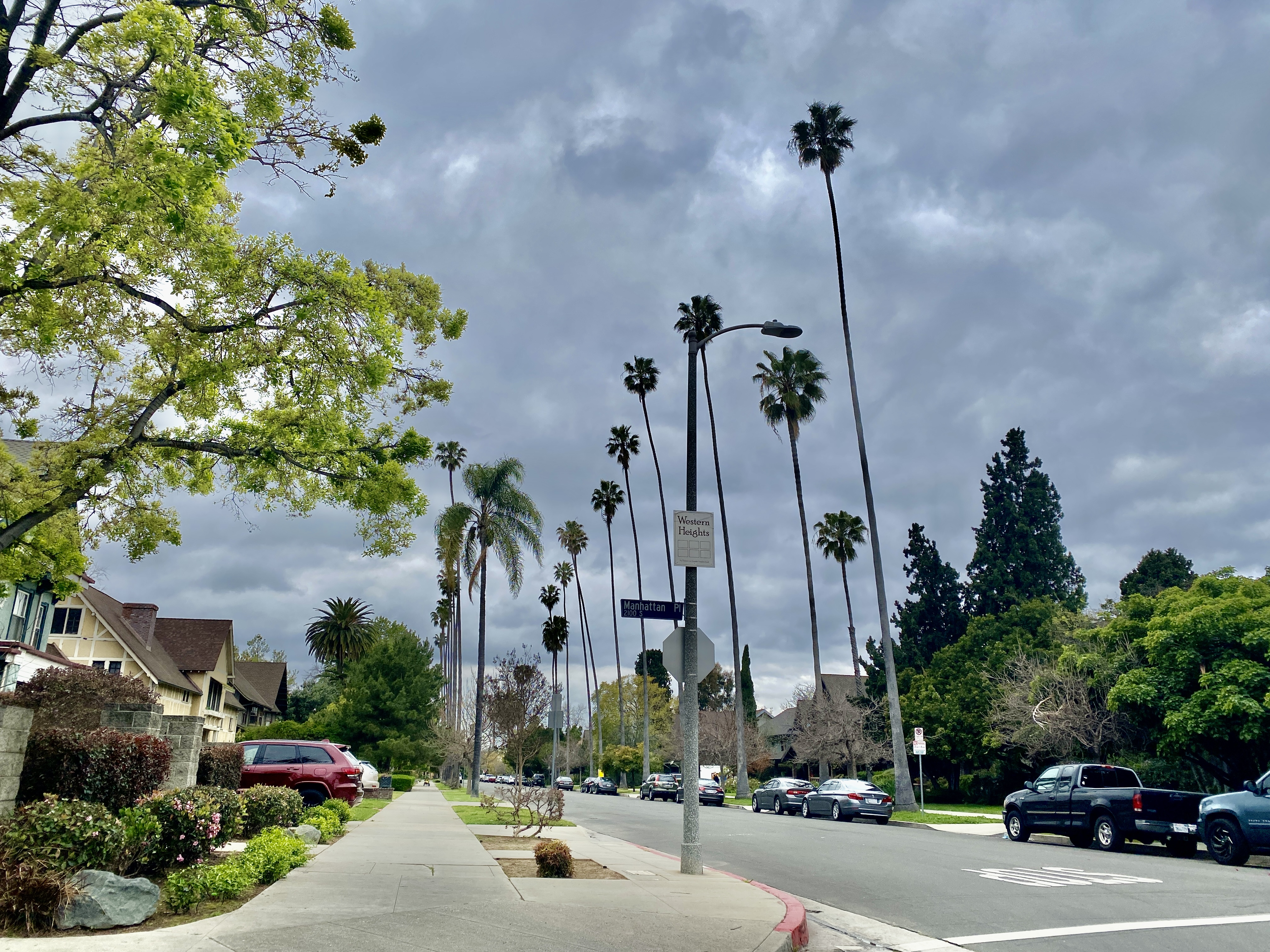
Western Heights, Los Angeles, where the shooting took place.

Marvin Gaye died on April 1, 1984, at the hands of his father Marvin Gay Sr., who shot Gaye twice, once in the shoulder and once in the heart. The shot in the heart proved fatal. The shooting, at his parents' Gramercy Place residence at the West Adams district of Western Heights, Los Angeles was a culmination of months of tension between the two men.

Four months prior to his death, Gaye's bodyguard sent a gun to his father at the Gramercy residence via Gaye's request to protect the singer from what he perceived to be "would-be assassins".

One verbal altercation between father and son involved the police, who then proceeded to escort Gaye off the property after his father requested that he leave the house. After spending time at a friend's house, Gaye returned to the Gramercy residence to try to patch things up with his father.

A day prior to the murder, Gay Sr. berated his wife over a misplaced insurance policy, which angered Gaye, who told him to leave his mother alone.

The next day, at around 12:30 that afternoon, Gay Sr. once again demanded to find the missing document to which a despondent Gaye demanded his father to not come to his room if he continued to assault his mother.

When Gay Sr. began berating Alberta, an enraged Gaye pushed his father out of the room. When Gay Sr. continued to protest, Gaye punched and kicked him in the hallway. The fight continued in his father's bedroom where Gaye continued to kick his father.

When Alberta managed to separate Gaye from his father, an emotional Gaye returned to his bedroom, telling his mother he was gonna leave the house for good after the altercation. At that point, around 12:38 that afternoon, Gay Sr. returned to Gaye's bedroom with his gun and shot Gaye dead.

When paramedics arrived, it reportedly took twenty minutes before Gaye's body was escorted to California Hospital Medical Center where, at 1:01 that afternoon, Gaye was pronounced dead. The singer died prior to his 45th birthday. Gaye's family members believed the singer's death was a "premeditated suicide", as they felt he provoked their father to shoot him due to his depression.

According to his brother Frankie, after he found him dying from his gunshot wounds, Gaye explained that he had his father shoot him because he "couldn't do it himself".

Gaye's sister Jeanne later said that, by forcing his father's hand in the murder, Gaye had "accomplished three things. He put himself out of his misery. He brought relief to Mother by finally getting her husband out of her life. And he punished Father, by making certain that the rest of his life would be miserable... my brother knew just what he was doing."

Gaye's mother filed for divorce from her husband of 49 years on the day of their son's murder; she bailed him out after the family requested their father's bond to be reduced and due to Alberta feeling like Gay Sr. "suffered enough". The divorce was granted a short time afterwards and Alberta spent the rest of her life at her daughter Jeanne's Burbank, California residence until her death in 1987, the same year her son Marvin was posthumously inducted into the Rock and Roll Hall of Fame.

Gaye's funeral at Forest Lawn Cemetery in Hollywood attracted over 10,000 mourners while 500 of Gaye's closest friends, colleagues and relatives attended a private service that was attended by most of Gaye's surviving family, Motown colleagues such as Berry Gordy, Smokey Robinson and Stevie Wonder, as well as television hosts Dick Clark and Don Cornelius and singers Little Richard, Barry White and Jermaine Jackson. Gaye was subsequently cremated afterwards with most of his ashes spread all over the Pacific Ocean by Gaye's first ex-wife Anna and all three of the singer's children.

== Sources ==
- Banks, James G.; Banks, Peter S. (2004). The Unintended Consequences: Family and Community, the Victims of Isolated Poverty. Lanham, Md.: University Press of America. ISBN 9780761828563.
- Collier, Aldore (June 25, 1984). "Marvin Gaye's White Live-In Mate Suffers Miscarriage". Jet.
- Collier, Aldore (April 16, 1984). "Marvin Gaye: His Tragic Death and Troubled Death". Jet.
- Collier, Aldore (May 21, 1984). "Gaye's Son Is Named To Oversee His Father's Estate". Jet.
- Dyson, Eric Michael (2004). Mercy Mercy Me: The Art, Loves and Demons of Marvin Gaye. New York/Philadelphia: Basic Civitas. p. 164. ISBN 0-465-01769-X. "marvin gaye janis."
- Edmonds, Ben (2001). What's Going On?: Marvin Gaye and the Last Days of the Motown Sound. Canongate U.S. ISBN 1-84195-314-8.
- Edmonds, Ben (2001). Let's Get It On (Deluxe ed.). Motown Records, a Division of UMG Recordings, Inc. MOTD 4757.
- Evelyn, Douglas; Dickson, Paul; Ackerman, S.J. (2008). On This Spot: Pinpointing the Past in Washington, D.C. Sterling, Va.: Capital Books. ISBN 9781933102702.
- Gaye, Frankie (2003). Marvin Gaye, My Brother. Backbeat Books. ISBN 0-87930-742-0.
- Gaye, Jan; Ritz, David (2015). After the Dance: My Life with Marvin Gaye. HarperCollins. ISBN 0-0621-3551-1.
- Glatt, John (April 11, 2011). For I Have Sinned: True Stories of Clergy Who Kill. Macmillan. ISBN 978-1-42992-442-9.
- Gulla, Bob (2008). Icons of R&B and Soul: An Encyclopedia of the Artists Who Revolutionized Rhythm. ABC-CLIO. ISBN 978-0-313-34044-4.
- Gutheim, Frederick A.; Lee, Antoinette J. (2006). Worthy of the Nation: Washington, D.C., From L'Enfant to the National Capital Planning Commission. Baltimore, Md.: Johns Hopkins University Press. ISBN 9780801883286.
- MacKenzie, Alex (2009). The Life and Times of the Motown Stars. Right Recordings. ISBN 978-1-84226-014-2.
- Marx, Eve (September 18, 2009). 101 Things You Didn't Know About Sex (Google eBook). Adams Media. ISBN 978-1-44050-428-0.
- Ritz, David (1991). Divided Soul: The Life of Marvin Gaye. Cambridge, Mass: Da Capo Press. ISBN 0-306-81191-X.
- Turner, Steve (1998). Trouble Man: The Life and Death of Marvin Gaye. London: Michael Joseph. ISBN 0-7181-4112-1.
