= Gaye family =

Family of Motown musical artist Marvin Gaye

The Gaye family is a family most notable for their relation to Motown music artist Marvin Gaye. Along with Marvin, many of the family members have also made contributions within the music industry, theatre and film. Aside from him, the most notable relatives include Gaye's father Marvin Gay Sr., his mother Alberta, brother Frankie, sister Zeola, brother-in-law Gordon Banks, son Marvin III (adopted by his first wife Anna from her niece Denise Gordy), and daughter Nona.

== Family ==
- 1 George Gay (1891–1971)
  - + Mamie Gay (1891–1981)
    - 2 Marvin Pentz Gay I (1 October 1914 – 10 October 1998)
      - + Alberta Cooper (1 January 1913 – 8 May 1987)
        - 3 Jeanne Gay (17 December 1936 – 23 May 2021)
        - 3 Marvin Pentz Gaye II (2 April 1939 – 1 April 1984)
          - + Anna Ruby Gordy (28 January 1922 – 31 January 2014)
          - + Denise Gordy (11 November 1949 – )
            - 4 Marvin Pentz Gaye III (17 November 1965 – )
              - + Jenny-Joi Fennimore
                - 5 Marvin Pentz Gaye IV (1 April 1995 – )
              - + Deanna Holley
                - 5 Dylan Gaye (May 2000 – )
          - + Janis Hunter (5 January 1956 – 3 December 2022)
            - 4 Nona Marvisa Gaye (4 September 1974 – )
              - + Justin Martinez
                - 5 Nolan Pentz Martinez (Jun 1997 – )
            - 4 Francis "Frankie" Christian Gaye (16 November 1975 – )
        - 3 Frances "Frankie" Gaye (15 November 1941 – 30 December 2001)
          - + Judy
            - 4 Christy Gaye (1974 – )
            - 4 Denise Gaye (1976 – )
          - + Irene Duncan
            - 4 April Gaye (1983 – )
            - 4 Frankie Gaye, Jr. (1992 – )
            - 4 Fiona Gaye (1993 – )
        - 3 Zeola "Sweetsie" Gaye (1945 – )
          - + Gordon "Guitar" Banks (1955 – 2023)
