= Sexual Healing Tour =

1983 concert tour by Marvin Gaye

- Tour by Marvin Gaye
- Poster to the concert in Rochester, New York
- Associated album: Midnight Love
- Start date: April 18, 1983
- End date: August 14, 1983
- Legs: 1
- No. of shows: 51

Marvin Gaye concert chronology
- Heavy Love Affair Tour (1981); Sexual Healing Tour (1983)

The Sexual Healing Tour was the final concert tour of American singer Marvin Gaye, then promoting his hit album, Midnight Love and named after the album's Grammy-winning smash hit single, "Sexual Healing". The tour took place at multiple theaters, arenas, coliseums and clubs throughout the spring and summer of 1983, between April 18 and August 14, 1983. It was Gaye's final concert tour before the singer's death in April 1984.

== Background ==
In March 1982, Marvin Gaye announced that he had signed with Columbia Records, a subsidiary of CBS Records at the time, after a 21-year tenure at Motown Records' Tamla subsidiary, with which he had helped to shape the label's trademark Motown Sound with a series of hits including "How Sweet It Is (To Be Loved By You)", "Ain't No Mountain High Enough" and "I Heard It Through the Grapevine" and later created popular albums, such as What's Going On and Let's Get It On. Following the release of his last hit with Motown, the disco-leaning "Got to Give It Up" in 1977 and the release of two poorly-received albums, 1978's Here, My Dear and 1981's In Our Lifetime, Gaye told intimates of his plans to leave Motown after, he believed, the label had re-edited the album In Our Lifetime without his knowledge. Gaye, who was dealing with financial problems in the United States, was now stationed at Ostend, a coastal city and municipality, located in the province of West Flanders in the Flemish Region of Belgium, being managed by local deejay and concert promoter Freddy Cousaert, who helped to negotiate an exit from Motown with several labels offering to sign the singer following news he was leaving his longtime label. He was already recording music for his new album when the contract was finally signed in March 1982.

In the second week of October 1982, Gaye released the first single from his upcoming album, Midnight Love, a reggae-inspired post disco number titled "Sexual Healing", which immediately became a hit, rising to number one on Billboard's Black Singles chart in November, staying at the top spot for ten consecutive weeks, a record for a 1980s single. It eventually crossed over to the Billboard Hot 100, where it peaked at number three, in early 1983, becoming his biggest charting hit to date, and was certified gold by the RIAA for sales of one million copies in December 1982. Midnight Love was released in November and became an immediate success too, reaching number one on the Black Albums chart, where it stayed for eight weeks, and later peaking at number 7 on the Billboard 200. Much like "Sexual Healing", the album also became an instant hit, being certified platinum by the RIAA in the same month as "Sexual Healing". Gaye's comeback culminated in his first major wins at the American Music Awards and Grammy Awards, with "Sexual Healing" winning the former for Favorite Soul/R&B Single, and winning two in the latter ceremony for Best Male R&B Vocal Performance and Best R&B Instrumental.

Initially, Gaye had no plans to promote his album nor tour, citing stage fright for the latter reason, while citing a newfound connection to his spirituality and his break from a debilitating dependency on cocaine for the former. But after his mother Alberta Gay was reported to be at a Los Angeles hospital, stricken with bone cancer, Gaye returned to the United States to tend to her in October 1982, after having stayed in Belgium for over a year and in Europe as a whole following the end of a European tour there. Throughout 1983, Gaye mostly stuck to his promise of not promoting the album, only showing up at selected shows, including the Merv Griffin Show. In February, he appeared at the NBA All-Star Game and performed his rendition of "The Star Spangled Banner", which was well received but also controversial due to Gaye's soulful rearrangements. That same month, he performed "Sexual Healing" at the Grammy Awards prior to winning in the Best Male R&B Vocal Performance category, his first after 10 prior nominations. In May, Gaye appeared at the Motown silver anniversary special, Motown 25: Yesterday, Today, Forever, where he performed "What's Going On", with his final televised performance taken place at Soul Train on June 11. However, it was announced even before the beginning of the year that Gaye would embark on his first US tour in over four years titled The Sexual Healing Tour, which would be handled by Innervisions Productions.

Despite his fears, Gaye agreed to do the tour, partially due to still being in debt with the IRS over alimony payments his ex-wives Anna Gordy Gaye and Janis Gaye were due. Prior to signing with CBS, the label had agreed to alleviate Gaye's debts to the IRS for over $1 million from the singer's failure to pay back taxes. Still, the singer dealt with financial difficulties that would only be resolved after his death.

== Tour ==
The Sexual Healing Tour took off at Humphrey's Concerts by the Bay in San Diego on April 18, over two weeks after the singer's 44th birthday. Gaye performed most of the songs from the Midnight Love album, opening the show with the song "Third World Girl" and also performed songs such as "Joy", "Rockin' After Midnight", before ending the show with "Sexual Healing" itself.

Most of the dates of the show, 51 in all, were sold out, including a six-date residency in May at New York's Radio City Music Hall, where he broke Barry Manilow's record of five sold-out shows at the venue, which culminated in Gaye celebrating the triumph with a party held in his honor at Studio 54 with ex-wife Janis, who joined him on the tour though she'd later leave after a volatile argument with Gaye in Miami. Several performances were either taped and/or recorded by fans, with one recorded show, purportedly from a show in Indianapolis, later released on several bootleg CDs under dubious titles. Another show, taped at the Summit in Houston, Texas during the beginning of the tour, was taped and later performances of the show were uploaded on YouTube. In July, Gaye performed a show at Billy Bob's Texas, which was mainly a nightclub for country acts, making history as one of the first R&B performers to headline there.

Some of the highlights on the tour included Gaye performing a medley of his hit duets with Tammi Terrell with his backing singer Paulette McWilliams singing along to some of the songs including "Ain't Nothing Like the Real Thing" and "Your Precious Love" while also performing his favorite duets he recorded with other female artists including Diana Ross ("Love Twins"), Mary Wells ("Once Upon a Time") and ending with a brief performance of "If This World Were Mine", which had recently been covered by Luther Vandross and Cheryl Lynn, but originally recorded by Gaye and Terrell. Another highlight was his dual performances of his 1973 hits, "Come Get to This" and "Let's Get It On" as well as a three-song medley from the What's Going On album, including "God is Love", the title track and "Inner City Blues (Make Me Wanna Holler)" as well as his performance of "Distant Lover".

During "Sexual Healing", Gaye, who often changed outfits three times during the show, came back after an instrumental interlude by his band, including percussionist Sheila E, dressed in a silk robe and pajamas, before slowly removing both the robe and his pajama top. On some shows, he teased the audience by undoing the tie on his pajama pants before joking, "Nah they're gonna think I'm Prince, lemme pull this back up", later putting back on his robe ending the performance. On others, Gaye's background dancers would pull the pants down to the audience's delight. At the end of every show, Gaye, who would redress, would tell the audience that he would probably retire from music after the tour and become a minister, his father Marvin Gay Sr.'s former profession. On that note, his band, led by his brother-in-law, guitarist and collaborator Gordon Banks and the tour's musical director McKinley Jackson, would cue to "My Love Is Waiting", which also included Gaye mentioning Jesus in the song. Gaye would tell the audience despite having performed the raunchy "Sexual Healing" that he "love[d] God" and that he "still love[d] Jesus".

== Gaye's drug abuse and paranoia ==
Gaye was not without problems on the tour, however. Shortly after returning to the United States in 1982, Gaye returned to freebasing cocaine, a habit he had picked up while living in London in the beginning of the 1980s. The singer had also began using PCP, known in its use in the street as "angel dust", a dissociative anesthetic mainly used recreationally for its significant mind-altering effects, which can cause hallucinations, distorted perceptions of sounds, and violent behavior. Gaye's usage of both drugs led to the singer developing paranoia in which he feared there was an attempt on his life. While in New Haven, Connecticut on July 13th, Gaye held a press conference that was televised. With his attorney F. Lee Bailey present, Gaye read from his statement, "I feel that there has been a conspiracy to poison me, and fortunately, I think, early enough we've uncovered the conspiracy", before ending the press conference with no comment to reporters. Prior to this press conference, Gaye claimed that he was invited to friend, comedian Dick Gregory's house, where he developed a vaccine and administered it to Gaye after he told Gregory that he feared he was the victim of food poisoning.

While in Massachusetts, a former road worker, Eric Sharpe, was found dead at a hotel room hanging from his towel in what was deemed a suicide. Despite this, Gaye didn't believe it was a suicide and this only confirmed to him that he was the intended target, not Sharpe. While in Florida, Gaye canceled some dates after he collapsed from exhaustion before a show at Sunrise. The incident reportedly occurred after a fight with his ex-wife Janis. He also entered a rehab center around this time in a desperate attempt to kick his drug habit. Gaye had gotten so paranoid that he would wear a bulletproof vest offstage and ordered his bodyguards and brother Frankie to wear them as well for protection. After performing a five-date residency at the Greek Theatre in Los Angeles, Gaye finished the tour on August 14 at the Pacific Amphitheatre in Costa Mesa, California. It would be his final performance before his death, more than 20 years after making his debut performance as part of the Motortown Revue.

== Setlist ==
1. "Third World Girl"
2. "I Heard It Through the Grapevine"
3. "Come Get to This"
4. "Let's Get It On"
5. "God is Love"
6. "What's Going On"
7. "Inner City Blues (Make Me Wanna Holler)"
8. Duet Medley: "Ain't Nothing Like the Real Thing" / "Your Precious Love" / "Love Twins" / "Once Upon a Time" / "If I Could Build My Whole World Around You" / "If This World Were Mine"
9. "Joy"
10. "Rockin' After Midnight"
11. "Distant Lover"
12. Instrumental Interlude
13. "Sexual Healing"

== Shows ==
Date	City	Country	Venue
North America
April 18, 1983	San Diego	United States	Humphrey's By the Bay
April 22, 1983	San Carlos	United States	Circle Star Theater
April 23, 1983	San Carlos	United States	Circle Star Theater
April 24, 1983	San Carlos	United States	Circle Star Theater
April 29, 1983	Houston	United States	The Summit
May 1, 1983	Atlanta	United States	Fox Theatre
May 7, 1983	Dallas	United States	Reunion Arena
May 8, 1983	Shreveport	United States	Hirsch Memorial Coliseum
May 17, 1983	New York City	United States	Radio City Music Hall
May 18, 1983	New York City	United States	Radio City Music Hall
May 19, 1983	New York City	United States	Radio City Music Hall
May 20, 1983	New York City	United States	Radio City Music Hall
May 21, 1983	New York City	United States	Radio City Music Hall
May 22, 1983	New York City	United States	Radio City Music Hall
May 26, 1983	Tampa	United States	USF Sun Dome
June 1, 1983	Memphis	United States	Mid-South Coliseum
June 3, 1983	Hampton	United States	Hampton Coliseum
June 9, 1983	Indianapolis	United States	Market Square Arena
June 10, 1983	Merrillville	United States	Holiday Star Music Theater
June 11, 1983	Cincinnati	United States	Cincinnati Gardens
June 12, 1983	Detroit	United States	Joe Louis Arena
June 23, 1983	Rockford	United States	MetroCentre
June 24, 1983	St. Louis	United States	Checkerdome
June 25, 1983	Oklahoma	United States	Zoo Amphitheatre
June 26, 1983	Kansas City	United States	Kemper Arena
June 28, 1983	Omaha	United States	Omaha Civic Auditorium
July 1, 1983	Highland Heights	United States	Front Row Theater
July 2, 1983	Highland Heights	United States	Front Row Theater
July 3, 1983	Highland Heights	United States	Front Row Theater
July 4, 1983	Highland Heights	United States	Front Row Theater
July 8, 1983 (8:00 pm show)	Pittsburgh	United States	Stanley Theatre
July 8, 1983 (11:30 pm show)	Pittsburgh	United States	Stanley Theatre
July 9, 1983	Philadelphia	United States	Spectrum
July 11, 1983	Toronto	United States	Massey Hall
July 12, 1983	Boston	United States	Boston Common
July 14, 1983	New Haven	United States	New Haven Veterans Memorial Coliseum
July 15, 1983	East Rutherford	United States	Brendan Byrne Arena
July 16, 1983	Rochester	United States	Rochester Community War Memorial
July 22, 1983	Greensboro	United States	Greensboro Coliseum
July 23, 1983	Albany	United States	Albany Civic Center
July 24, 1983	Tallahassee	United States	Tallahassee-Leon City Civic Center
July 27, 1983	Fort Worth	United States	Billy Bob's Texas
July 31, 1983	Austin	United States	Frank Erwin Center
August 3, 1983	Los Angeles	United States	Greek Theatre
August 4, 1983	Los Angeles	United States	Greek Theatre
August 5, 1983	Los Angeles	United States	Greek Theatre
August 6, 1983	Los Angeles	United States	Greek Theatre
August 7, 1983	Los Angeles	United States	Greek Theatre
August 12, 1983 (7:30 pm show)	Phoenix	United States	Celebrity Theatre
August 12, 1983 (10:30 pm show)	Phoenix	United States	Celebrity Theatre
August 14, 1983	Costa Mesa	United States	Pacific Amphitheatre

== Sources ==
- Ritz, David (1991). Divided Soul: The Life of Marvin Gaye. Cambridge, Massachusetts: Da Capo Press. ISBN 0-306-81191-X.
