= Killing of Marvin Gaye =

1984 homicide in Los Angeles, California

- People gathering outside Marvin Gaye's house following news the singer was fatally shot, April 1, 1984
- Location: 34°2′16″N 118°18′49″W; Arlington Heights, Los Angeles, California, U.S.
- Date: April 1, 1984; 42 years ago c. 12:38 p.m. (PDT; UTC-08:00)
- Attack type: Homicide by shooting
- Weapon: Smith & Wesson .38 Special
- Victim: Marvin Gaye
- Perpetrator: Marvin Gay Sr.
- Charges: Voluntary manslaughter

On April 1, 1984, American singer and songwriter Marvin Gaye was shot and killed on the day before his 45th birthday by his father, Marvin Gay Sr., at their house in the Western Heights neighborhood of Los Angeles, California. The shooting was a culmination of growing tension between the two men. According to police reports, Gaye intervened in an argument between his parents that later exploded into a physical confrontation between father and son, with the latter party physically dominating the other. Gaye was said to have battled with substance abuse around this time, which affected his actions on the day of his murder.

Gaye was reportedly shot by his father afterwards at around 12:38 p.m. Pacific Standard Time (UTC–8). He was shot twice, once in the shoulder and once in the heart, the latter shot being fatal. Gaye was found dying by his brother Frankie while his wife Irene Gaye called 9-1-1. Paramedics reportedly waited approximately 20 minutes before tending to Gaye as they were unsure about the whereabouts of Marvin Gay Sr. or the gun until Irene Gaye retrieved the gun from Gay Sr.'s pillow and Gay Sr. exited the property. Rushed to California Hospital Medical Center, Gaye was pronounced dead on arrival at 1:01 p.m. that day. Family believed the shooting was a "premeditated suicide" since Gaye had often talked about death.

Gay Sr. later pleaded no contest to a charge of voluntary manslaughter and was sentenced to five years' probation. After a star-studded funeral, Gaye was cremated and part of his ashes were spread around the Pacific Ocean.

== Background ==
Marvin Gaye performing in concert in the early 1980s

Marvin Gaye had a bitter relationship with his father, Marvin Gay Sr., since his childhood. Gay Sr. was a Christian minister and strict disciplinarian who often physically punished his children. He was also a cross-dresser, a fact widely known in the family's Washington, D.C. neighborhood, which made the younger Gaye a target of bullying. Due to this "sexual ambiguity" on the part of his father, as well as rumors of Gaye's own sexual orientation, the younger Gaye added an "e" to his last name when he began his solo career in Motown. Gaye's father never approved of his son's career in secular music, and gradually grew resentful that Gaye was closer to his mother, Alberta, and had become the breadwinner for the family. Despite a brief improvement in their relationship after Gaye found success with his album What's Going On, father and son never found any lasting peace.

By 1983, after a period as a European tax exile, Gaye had re-entered the public eye with the hit song "Sexual Healing" and its album, Midnight Love. For a time, the singer, who was a longtime drug addict, particularly with cocaine, had cut back on its usage during his yearlong stay in Ostend, a coastal city in western Belgium under the watchful eye of promoter Freddy Couseart. Gaye abruptly returned to the United States in October 1982 after learning that his mother Alberta was having life-saving kidney surgery in a Los Angeles hospital. Gay Sr. wasn't by his wife's side. At the time he was in their former neighborhood of Washington, D.C. where he was in the process of selling the family's former home.

During his mother's recovery, Gaye embarked on his final concert tour, the Sexual Healing Tour, in San Diego, California, at Humphreys on April 18, 1983. Despite the tour's early success, by the time of his sold-out six date residency at Radio City Music Hall, Gaye struggled to perform due to illness brought by on frequent use of cocaine and PCP, which led to increasing paranoia and the belief that he was targeted to be killed. Gaye wore a bulletproof vest and had his brother Frankie, friend Dave Simmons and security guard Andre White carry guns while he also carried guns. According to David Ritz, his biographer and collaborator on his hit single "Sexual Healing", Gaye had a minister reading Bible scripture to him in one room and a drug dealer offering him coke in another.

Prior to the tour, Gaye settled at his parents' residence at 2101 South Gramercy Place at the West Adams district of Los Angeles in early 1983 after failing to pay rent on a house in Sherman Oaks. Gaye had personally purchased the property for his parents in 1975. Gaye's father remained absent from the property until returning in October 1983, two months after Gaye ended his tour. The house was preoccupied by the singer's sisters until Gay Sr. returned, by which then they left noting the tension that was growing between the two men.

For the next six months, the two men struggled to keep their distance from one another. During one quarrel at the house, the elder Gay called police to have his son leave the property. After staying with one of his sisters, however, Gaye returned to the property, stating to a friend of his, "After all, I have just one father. I want to make peace with him." Jeanne Gay later told David Ritz that her father had told her if Marvin ever touched him, he'd "kill him".

On Christmas Day 1983, Gaye's father was presented with a Smith & Wesson .38 Special from Gaye's bodyguard Andre White. The gun was given to Gay Sr. to protect himself, Alberta and Gaye from supposed intruders. Gaye had given White the order to give his father the gun. Later, following Gaye's funeral, Alberta Gay reportedly told White that she wished he hadn't given Gay Sr. the gun.

Friends and family members contended that the younger Gaye was often suicidal and paranoid, and by now was afraid of leaving his room and spoke of little besides suicide and death. Gaye sometimes wore three overcoats and put his shoes on the wrong feet. Four days before his death, according to his sister Jeanne, Gaye had tried to kill himself by jumping out of a speeding sports car, but suffered only minor bruises. Jeanne contended that "there was no doubt Marvin wanted to die" and that he "couldn't take any more."

== Killing ==
Marvin Gay Sr. at his sentencing hearing following the shooting of his son, September 1984

In the days prior to his death, Gaye's parents had arguments mainly over a misplaced insurance policy letter. On the day before his death, the arguments spread to Gaye's bedroom. Angered by his father confronting his mother, Gaye commanded Marvin Sr. to leave her alone; Marvin Sr. complied without incident, and there was no violence that night, but Marvin Sr. continued yelling throughout the house.

On April 1, 1984, at approximately 12:30 p.m. PST an impatient Marvin Sr. shouted upstairs to his wife about the document. Gaye, dressed in his maroon robe, shouted back downstairs, telling his father that if he had to say something, he should do it in person. According to Alberta, when Marvin Sr. refused his son's request, Gaye warned him not to come to his room. Marvin Sr. instead charged upstairs to the bedroom to verbally attack Alberta over the document, causing Gaye to jump out of his bed and once again order his father out of the room. When ordering did not work, Gaye, enraged, reportedly shoved his father out of the room into the hallway, then began punching and kicking him.

Alberta later told Ritz: "Marvin hit him. I shouted for him to stop, but he paid no attention to me. He gave my husband some hard kicks." Jeanne later recalled that it was understood in the family that if one of the children ever dared to strike their father that he would "murder him or her", saying her father "made it very clear" and "said so publicly on more than one occasion". Gaye reportedly followed his father to the bedroom and, according to his mother, continued to kick him brutally. Eventually, Alberta separated Gaye from his father and returned him to his bedroom. Afterwards, Marvin grabbed a suitcase and told his mother that he was "going to get my things and get out of this house. Father hates me and I'm never coming back."

Minutes later, at 12:38 p.m., Marvin Sr. entered his bedroom, returning with the .38 pistol his son had bought him, pointed it at Gaye and shot him directly in the heart, as Alberta later explained to police:

I was standing about eight feet away from Marvin, when my husband came to the door of the bedroom with his pistol. My husband didn't say anything, he just pointed the gun at Marvin. I screamed but it was very quick. He, my husband, shot – and Marvin screamed. I tried to run. Marvin slid down to the floor after the first shot.

The first shot, which proved to be fatal, entered the right side of Gaye's chest, perforating his right lung, heart, diaphragm, liver, stomach, and left kidney before coming to rest against his left flank. Marvin Sr. stepped closer after the first shot and shot him a second time at point-blank range.

In a 2018 episode of the Reelz TV series Autopsy: The Last Hours of..., forensic pathologist Michael Hunter expressed his belief that Gaye was initially shot nonfatally in the left shoulder by his father, while the two men were standing two feet apart while facing each other. Hunter believed that this first shot "penetrated the left shoulder just below the clavicle and exited his back without causing any serious injury", the impact of which caused Gaye to fall down. Abrasions found on Gaye's knees and left hand are consistent with the belief that Gaye fell down. Hunter also believed that Gaye was then shot fatally in the chest, which "had a very damaging and odd trajectory," traveling "diagonally down through the lung, heart, diaphragm, liver, and kidney, finally embedding itself on the left side of the torso." From Hunter's point of view, "the direction of the bullet's trajectory suggests Marvin was positioned toward his father, and that his father was likely to have been moving away at the time."

Afraid of being shot next, Alberta screamed and ran out of the bedroom, all the while pleading in fear to her husband not to shoot her. According to reports, Gaye's father hid the gun underneath his pillow. In the meantime, Gaye's brother Frankie and his sister-in-law, Irene, heard the shots as they lived in a guest house on the property. After the first shot, Frankie initially thought it sounded like a car backfired. Afterwards, they heard screams from outside, rushed out, and saw Alberta who ran into Irene's arms, crying and screaming, "He's shot Marvin. He's killed my boy."

Frankie ran to the house and carefully walked into the hallway to his brother's room, not knowing if Marvin Sr. was still armed, whether he was still in the room, or if his brother was dead. After walking into Gaye's bedroom, an emotional Frankie held him as Gaye bled rapidly. Frankie alleges that Marvin, barely speaking above a whisper, told him, "I got what I wanted... I couldn't do it myself, so I had him do it... it's good, I ran my race, there's no more left in me." After police arrived, Irene went to Marvin Sr. in his bedroom and asked him where the gun was. After searching over his bedroom, Irene located it under his pillow. Upon exiting the house, Irene dropped the gun on the lawn. Immediately following this, Marvin Sr., who had by now taken a seat on the front porch outside the house, was arrested.

The police arrived 20 minutes after the shooting. Gaye's body was taken out of the house and sent to the California Hospital Medical Center. At approximately 1:01 p.m., Gaye, still at the age of 44, was pronounced dead on arrival. As soon as his death was announced, several of Gaye's neighbors and onlookers paraded around the house, many in stunned shock and silence.

=== Autopsy and funeral ===
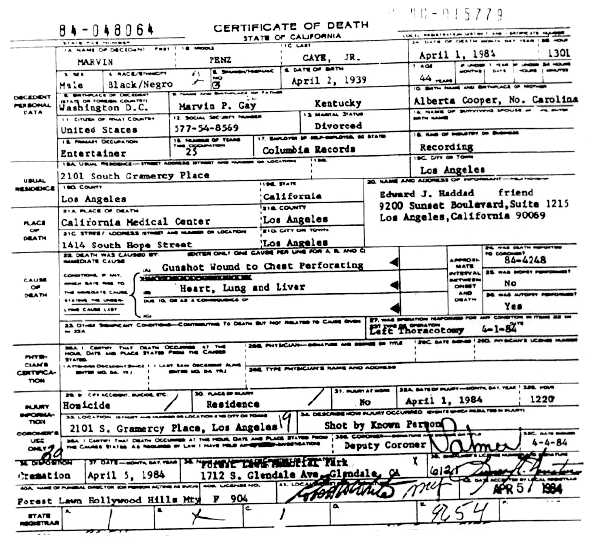
Gaye's death certificate

An autopsy was conducted on Gaye's body shortly after his death. Test results showed that he had measurable amounts of cocaine and PCP (or angel dust) in his system. After lawyers misread the coroner's report, Judge Ronald George determined later during preliminary hearings in the court case that PCP can often provoke violence. When told that the report had concluded only that Gaye had just cocaine traces in his system, the judge said PCP was not a major factor in his decision.

During an interview with the police, Gaye's father contended that he was scared that something would happen to him and that he only meant to shoot in self-defense, stating he did not know the gun had any bullets in it, claiming he thought there were either "blanks or BBs." When asked if he loved his son, Marvin Sr. reportedly stated in a soft voice, "Let's say I didn't dislike him." Upon being told that his son had died from the shots, Marvin Sr. reportedly wept after realizing he had killed him. Marvin Sr. was held on bond afterwards.

Gaye's siblings believed that his death was a "premeditated suicide". Jeanne later said that, by forcing his father's hand in the murder, Gaye had "accomplished three things. He put himself out of his misery. He brought relief to Mother by finally getting her husband out of her life. And he punished Father, by making certain that the rest of his life would be miserable... my brother knew just what he was doing."

On April 5, 1984, a star-studded funeral was held for Gaye at Forest Lawn Memorial Park, Glendale, attended by over 10,000 mourners, (Note: According to news sources, while an estimated 400-500 people were allowed for the full service, thousands of fans of the singer were allowed to view the casket.) including his Motown colleagues; Berry Gordy, Little Richard, his two ex-wives, Anna Gaye and Janis Gaye; and his siblings, mother and three children. Smokey Robinson and Dick Gregory delivered eulogies, while Stevie Wonder performed "Lighting Up the Candles." It was later included on Wonder's soundtrack to the film Jungle Fever, and Cecil T. "Sesil J" Jenkins sang "The Lord's Prayer".

At the open-casket funeral, Gaye was wearing one of his costumes from his final concert tour, a gold and white military style uniform, with an ermine wrap at his shoulders. The funeral was presided by the Chief Apostle of Gaye's family's old church, the House of God. Following the funeral, Gaye was given a burial plot. In accordance with the family's request, his body was cremated with half of his ashes spread near the Pacific Ocean by his three children and Anna Gaye. Anna and their adopted son, Marvin III, then kept a small portion of the ashes for themselves.

Gaye left behind no will. As a result, his son Marvin III, age 18 at the time, became co-administrator of his estate. At the time of his death, Gaye was struggling financially, as the IRS had asked for $1 million (US$3,098,975 in 2025 dollars) to pay back unpaid taxes of $600,000 (US$1,859,385 in 2025 dollars) to the State of California and back alimony of $300,000 (US$929,693 in 2025 dollars) to Anna and Janis Gaye. He was $1,900,000 (US$5,888,053 in 2025 dollars) in debt at the time of his death, but royalties from Gaye's work eventually paid off those debts.

=== Court case ===
Marvin Sr. was held at the Los Angeles County Jail on $100,000 bail. His accounts of the shooting were printed in the Los Angeles Herald-Examiner, quoting his words: "I didn't mean to do it."

During a check up at the County-USC Medical Center, a benign tumor was discovered at the base of Marvin Sr.'s brain. Doctors removed the tumor on May 17, 1984. On June 12, after reviewing a two-page report, including two psychiatric evaluations conducted by Ronald Markman, Judge Michael Pirosh ruled that Marvin Sr. was competent to stand trial. He appeared in court again on June 20, where he was ordered to return on July 16 for a preliminary hearing.

Marvin Sr.'s estranged wife, Alberta, posted the reduced bail of $30,000 via a bondsman to secure the ex-minister's release from jail. Two days earlier, she had filed for divorce, citing as grounds that she had officially separated from him following their son's fatal shooting on the same day. Looking over documents, the amount of drugs in Gaye's system, and pictures of Marvin Sr.'s injuries during his final fight with his son, Judge Ronald M. George agreed to grant Marvin Sr. a plea bargain. As a result, he pleaded no contest to a voluntary manslaughter charge on September 20, 1984. On November 2, Judge Gordon Ringer sentenced Marvin Sr. to a six-year suspended sentence and five years of probation. During the sentencing hearing, Marvin Sr. tearfully told the court:

If I could bring him back, I would. I was afraid of him. I thought I was going to get hurt. I didn't know what was going to happen. I'm really sorry for everything that happened. I loved him. I wish he could step through this door right now. I'm paying the price now.

== Aftermath ==
=== Reactions ===
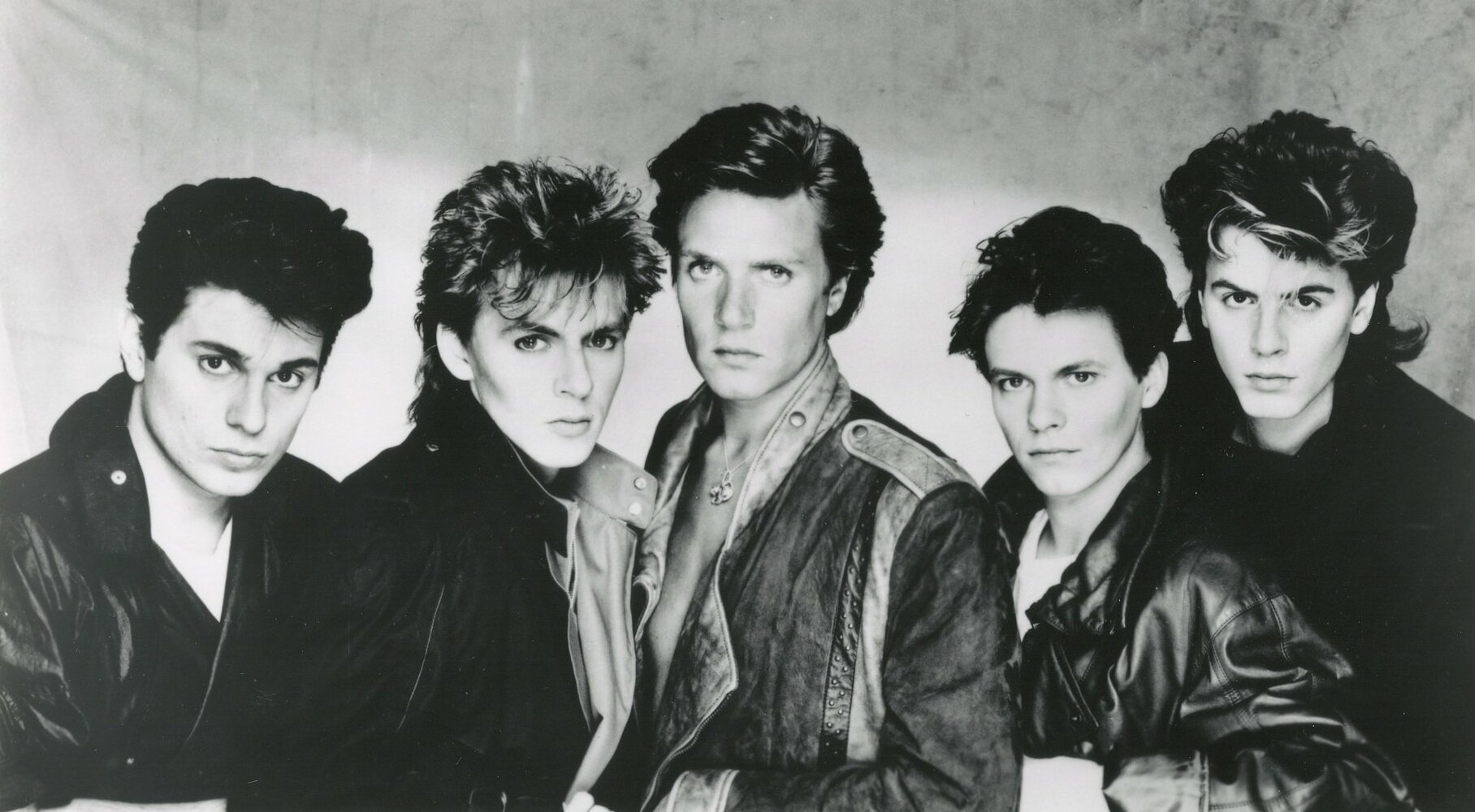
New wave band Duran Duran (pictured in 1983) dedicated their hit "Save a Prayer" to Gaye in concert the day after his death.

News stations reported on Gaye's death almost immediately after it was announced, with one of the most prominent announcements coming from CBS anchor Dan Rather. Eulogies were delivered in newspapers at American, Asian and European countries. The New York Times ran the story in its front page the day after his death.

Many of Gaye's friends and peers were initially shocked to learn of Gaye's death. Some of them did not initially believe the news because April 1 is also April Fools' Day, a date associated with jokes and hoaxes, with the media taking part in such for that day only. Otis Williams, of the Motown group The Temptations, recalled receiving the news while touring with the Four Tops in Australia and said, "It was a very dark day that I will never forget as the day I lost a friend."

Former Motown staffer Janie Bradford and her husband were driving home after listening to radio all day when the announcer announced Gaye's death. CBS Urban president Larkin Arnold was also reportedly stunned with the news as he had tried to get Gaye in the studio for his follow-up to Midnight Love. Smokey Robinson heard the news of Gaye's death on the radio; feeling that his "innards wouldn't accept" the news, he called Gaye's ex-wife Anna to find out whether it was true, and she confirmed it before he could ask her, leaving Robinson in shock.

Longtime Gaye admirer and former nephew-in-law Jermaine Jackson, brother of Michael Jackson, recalled sobbing uncontrollably once he heard the news and called Barry White to confirm the story. According to White, Gaye had agreed to do a series of duets with him. Berry Gordy's ex-wife Ray Singleton received the news from Anna on the phone. Upon the arrival of her son and Gaye's adopted son, Marvin III, Singleton told Gaye III to go upstairs and talk to his mother, who then told him the news.

VH1 listed Gaye's death as the eighth most shocking moment in rock and roll. Recollections of the death from admirers of Gaye included rapper Chuck D and Al Sharpton, who noted the coincidence of the date when he replied that the death came "like a sick, sad joke to all of us." Gordy, who was overcome with emotion and grief over Gaye's death, took out full-page ads following his funeral declaring that Gaye was "the greatest of his time" and the best recording artist he ever worked with. New wave group Duran Duran dedicated their hit ballad "Save a Prayer" to Gaye the following afternoon during a performance in Oakland, California; their performance was taped for the videotape Arena.

Immediately after his death, numerous fans of Gaye stood outside the house at Gramercy Place, placed memorabilia and other items on the lawn, and held vigils there until the next day, Gaye's birthday.

=== Memorials and tributes ===
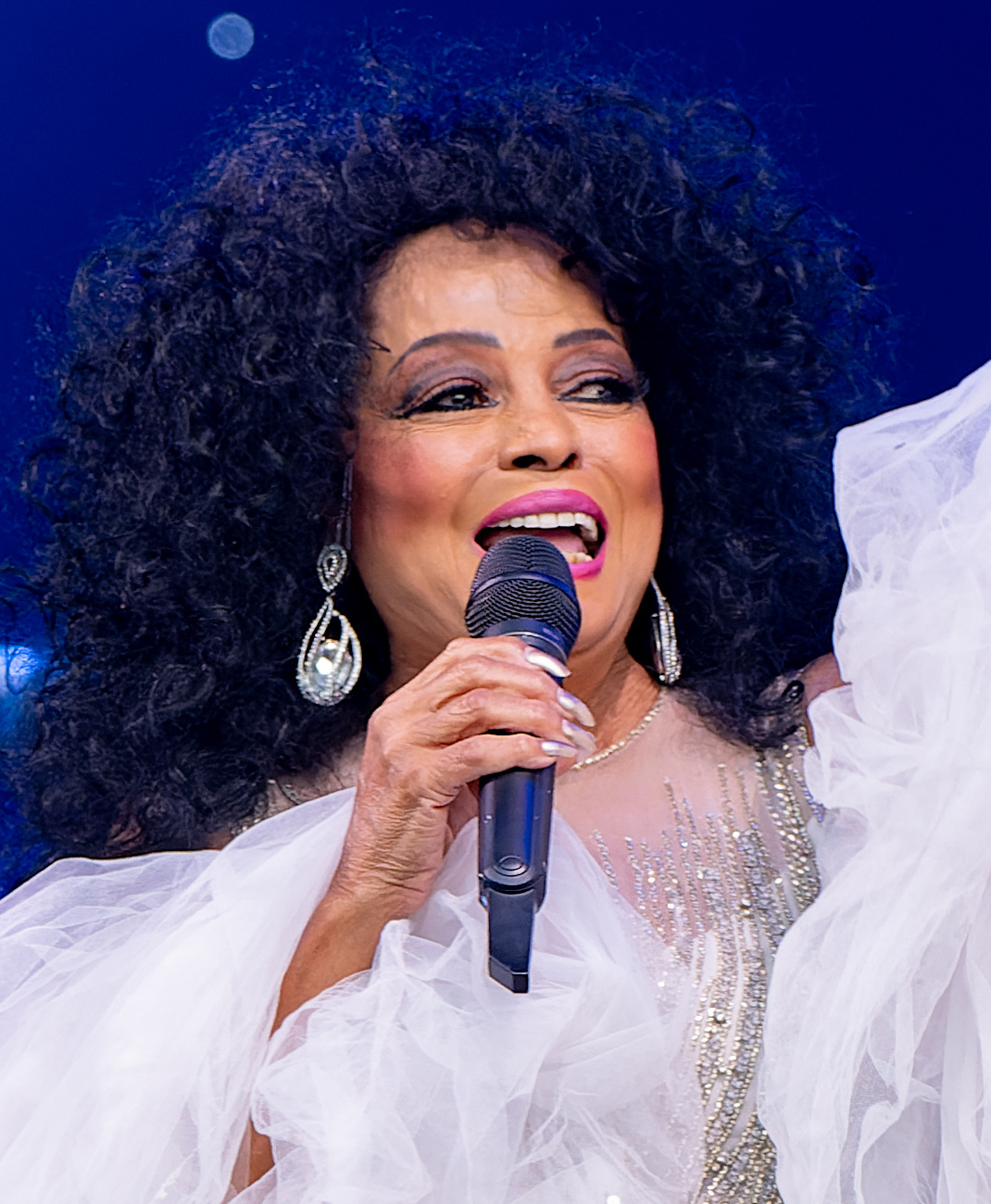
Diana Ross released the tribute song "Missing You" months after Gaye's death, the song was Ross' last top ten hit in the United States.

Gaye was placed on the cover of Rolling Stone for the third time in a posthumous cover in its May 10, 1984, issue. The issue discussed Gaye's personal life, his music, and his contributions to Motown and popular music.

In November 1984, Diana Ross released the tribute song "Missing You". It appeared on Ross' album Swept Away, and later peaked at No. 1 on the Hot Black Singles chart and placed at No. 10 on the Billboard Hot 100. Later, a video of the song featured classic footage of Gaye, including footage of Gaye appearing at Ross' 1982 concert in Brussels. The following January while hosting the American Music Awards, Ross led an In Memoriam tribute to stars who died in 1984 with Gaye leading the tribute. Also in November 1984, Teena Marie released the tribute song "My Dear Mr. Gaye" from her hit album, Starchild, the highest selling album of her career.

In 1985, The Commodores issued the song "Nightshift," which was dedicated to Gaye and fellow musician Jackie Wilson, who also died in 1984. The song, featured on their album of the same name, peaked at No. 1 on the rhythm and blues chart, reached the top ten on the Hot 100, and became a hit in other countries. Todd Rundgren's song "Lost Horizon" from his A Cappella album is said to be dedicated to Gaye. Rundgren later performed a medley of Gaye's hits during concerts and sometimes added "Lost Horizon" to the medley.

In 1989, soul band Frankie Beverly & Maze produced the tribute song, "Silky Soul," taking its melody from "What's Going On." The song featured Nona Gaye in the video and later peaked at No. 5 on the R&B chart. At least two tribute albums of Gaye's have been released: 1995's Inner City Blues: The Music of Marvin Gaye and 1999's Marvin Is 60: A Tribute Album.

Starting in 1985, there have been annual Marvin Gaye Day celebrations in the city of Washington, D.C., Gaye's hometown. The day was officiated by then-mayor Marion Barry on the day of Gaye's 46th birthday. Since then, a non-profit organization has helped to organize Marvin Gaye Day celebrations in the city. In 1986, Marvin's mother Alberta founded the Marvin P. Gaye Jr. Memorial Foundation, which is dedicated to those suffering from drug abuse and alcoholism. It opened a day after she died from complications of bone cancer in May 1987.

In 1990, after years of petitions and letters, Gaye was given a star on the Hollywood Walk of Fame, with one of its most prominent letters written by longtime fan Eddie Murphy. Six years later, in 1996, Gaye posthumously received the Grammy Lifetime Achievement Award. In 2006, an old park that Gaye frequented as a teenager, the former Watts Branch Park, was renamed Marvin Gaye Park in his honor. Three years later, in 2009, the 5200 block of Foote Street NE in Deanwood, Washington, D.C., was renamed Marvin Gaye Way.

On November 20, 2018, the United States Postal Service announced that Marvin Gaye would be featured on a first class postage stamp, as part of the Postal Service's Music Icons series (past honorees include Elvis Presley and John Lennon).

== Sources ==
- Collier, Aldore (April 16, 1984). "Marvin Gaye: His Tragic Death and Troubled Life". Jet.
- Collier, Aldore (May 21, 1984). "Gaye's Son Is Named To Oversee His Father's Estate". Jet.
- Collier, Aldore (April 8, 1985). "A Year Later: What Happened to Marvin Gaye's Family, Fortune?". Jet.
- Collier, Aldore (May 25, 1987). "Marvin Gaye's Mother Dies On Eve Of Opening Drug Center She Founded As His Memorial". Jet.
- Gaye, Frankie; Basten, Fred E. (2003). Marvin Gaye, My Brother. Backbeat Books. ISBN 0-87930-742-0.
- Glatt, John (April 11, 2011). For I Have Sinned: True Stories of Clergy Who Kill. Macmillan. ISBN 978-1-42992-442-9.
- Ritz, David (July 1985). "The Last Days of Marvin Gaye". Ebony.
- Ritz, David (1991). Divided Soul: The Life of Marvin Gaye. Cambridge, Massachusetts: Da Capo Press. ISBN 0-306-81191-X.
- Singleton, Raynoma (1990). Berry, Me and Motown : The Untold Story. Contemporary Books. ISBN 978-0809243402.

== Bibliography ==
- Davis, Sharon (1991). Marvin Gaye: I Heard It Through the Grapevine. Croydon, Surrey: Bookmarque Ltd. ISBN 1-84018-320-9.
- Dyson, Michael Eric (2004). Mercy, Mercy Me: The Art, Loves, and Demons of Marvin Gaye. New York/Philadelphia: Basic Civitas. ISBN 0-465-01769-X.
- Turner, Steve (1998). Trouble Man: The Life and Death of Marvin Gaye. London: Michael Joseph. ISBN 0-7181-4112-1.
