= Popcorn (Belgian music style) =

Belgian music style of altered oldies, pop, soul, R&B)

Belgian Popcorn
- Stylistic origins: R&B music, northern soul, soul music, oldies, pop music
- Cultural origins: Belgium, 1970s

Belgian Popcorn has been described as an underground music style and scene engineered by disc jockeys in the 1970s. Developed in Belgium with the tempo reduction and altered remixing of English and U.S. genres like R&B and soul music arrangement. Relatively obscure, and characterized by a slow or medium, rather than fast, tempo. The style has been described by musician and writer Bob Stanley as "possibly the last truly underground music scene in Europe." See New Beat.

== Overview and examples ==
According to Stanley, "the purity of Belgian Popcorn is its very impurity. R&B, Broadway numbers, tangos, Phil Spector-esque girl groups and loungey instrumentals, they are all constituent parts of a rare, and still largely undiscovered scene." By the 1990s, the Popcorn dance scene retained a core of aficionados even outside Belgium, having a level of recognition in venues and specialist clubs in Britain, Germany, and the US, with at least 30 compilations of American R&B and pop music in the Belgian Popcorn style being re-issued in Europe. Some highly-sought popcorn records include "Sweetheart" by Peggy Lee, "Image" by Hank Levine, "Who's Got the Action" by Phil Colbert, "Carmelita" by Jeff Lane. Gotta Think It Over by Keith Records' chorine and singer Oberia Martinez, 1962-63)"You Beat Me to the Punch" by Mary Wells, "Twine Time" by Alvin Cash.

== Origins ==
The Popcorn music scene first developed from dances held at the Groove discotheque in Ostend, where mid-tempo soul and ska music played by DJ Freddy Cousaert became popular in the late 1960s. Cousaert was later responsible for Marvin Gaye's move to Belgium in the early 1980s. In September 1969, a café, De Oude Hoeve, opened in a converted farm barn at Vrasene near Antwerp, and began holding dance competitions on Sunday afternoons. Soon up to 3,000 people began attending each week, dancing in a "slow swing" style to soul and funk records. The café was renamed the Popcorn – after the James Brown hit "The Popcorn"—and DJ Gilbert Govaert began playing more early soul and other records from the 1960s to suit the dance style. According to Stanley: "The beat was slow and slightly rickety, martial drums rolled under melancholy minor chords—The Marvelettes' 'Please Mr Postman' (1961) would have been typical."

Following the Popcorn club's popularity, other clubs sprang up playing music in a similar style. These included the Festival in Antwerp, the Gatsby in Vliermaal, and the Versailles, beside the beach at Ostend. As well as Cousaert and Govaert, other leading DJs included Jeff Callebaut, Gerry Franken, and Georges Toniotti. Radio stations were set up to play the music, and rare music on obscure labels became especially prized. The scene in Belgium, in many ways, paralleled the Northern soul scene in Britain, but with a slower swing style of music favoured, rather than the fast dance styles characteristic of Northern soul. In some cases, DJs slowed down records, by pitch control and by playing 45 rpm discs at 33 rpm, to achieve the desired tempo and rhythm. The range of the music also broadened, to include some British and Italian pop music from the early 1960s, and eventually local bands were formed to emulate the style.
