= Freddy Cousaert =

Belgian DJ (1937–1998)

Freddy Cousaert (1937 – 19 August 1998) was a Belgian DJ, club owner and concert promoter, who was influential in developing an audience for authentic rhythm and blues music in Europe, and, in particular, for his role in the career of Marvin Gaye.

== Life ==
From the late 1950s, Cousaert ran a club in Ostend that became known for playing American R&B music which was, at the time, rarely heard in Europe. Eric Burdon, who visited the club as a teenager, said that "We were attracted by the sounds on the jukebox... It wasn't the normal top 10 stuff. He had Ray Charles and Charles Brown, blues people." Cousaert regularly visited the Q Club in London, run by Jamaican-born Count Suckle, which was frequented by many musicians on the British R&B scene. By the late 1960s, Cousaert ran the Groove discotheque in Ostend, playing mid-tempo soul and ska music that later developed into what became known in Belgium as the Popcorn style. In the 1960s and 1970s, Cousaert also worked as a public relations executive for Muhammad Ali in Europe.

In 1980, American soul singer Marvin Gaye had completed a tour in Britain, had developed a serious dependence and addiction to cocaine, and was having to deal with major taxation issues with the US Internal Revenue Service. He contacted Cousaert, who persuaded him to relocate to Ostend. Gaye lived there with Cousaert and his family for several months in 1981, avoiding heavy drug use, exercising in a local gym, attending a local church, regaining his confidence and performing in concert in Ostend. Inspired by a comment made to Gaye by writer David Ritz, Gaye wrote his comeback song "Sexual Healing" while in Belgium. Cousaert was involved in Gaye signing a new contract with Columbia Records, before he returned to the US.

Cousaert continued to organise concerts in Belgium for R&B and soul singers. He was instrumental in setting up the regular Beach Festivals in Belgium.

== Death ==
He died in 1998, aged 61, from heart failure following a cycling accident near Bruges.
