= Nona Gaye =

American singer, actress and fashion model (born 1974)

- Born: Nona Marvisa Gaye; September 4, 1974 (age 52); Washington, D.C., U.S.
- Occupations: Singer; fashion model; actress
- Years active: 1989–2009 (actress); 1992–present (singer)
- Children: 1
- Father: Marvin Gaye
- Relatives: Slim Gaillard (grandfather); Marvin Gay Sr. (grandfather); Alberta Gay (grandmother); Frankie Gaye (uncle)
- Musical career
- Genres: R&B; soul; pop
- Label: Atlantic

Nona Marvisa Gaye (born September 4, 1974) is an American singer-songwriter, former fashion model, and retired actress. The daughter of singer Marvin Gaye and maternal granddaughter of jazz musician Slim Gaillard, Gaye began her career as a vocalist in the early 1990s. In film, she portrayed Zee in The Matrix Reloaded and The Matrix Revolutions (both 2003).

== Early life ==
Gaye was born in Washington, D.C., spending the first three weeks of her life in the capital of the United States. She is the daughter of Marvin Gaye, a Motown singer who was then married to Anna Gordy, and Janis Hunter, who later managed her daughter's music career. She was raised in Redondo Beach, California.

After Marvin Gaye divorced Gordy, Nona's parents wed in 1977 before ending their marriage four years later. Her father was killed in 1984 by her grandfather Marvin Gay Sr. when Nona was 9 years old.

As a child, Gaye had several aspirations, including ballet and gymnastics, but ultimately decided on a career in music during her teenage years.

== Career ==
=== Music ===
Gaye credits Billie Holiday, Paul Simon, Stevie Wonder and Red Hot Chili Peppers as having influenced her music. Her debut album Love for the Future was released on Atlantic Records in October 1992, a month after her eighteenth birthday. It featured the top-20 hit "I'm Overjoyed," as well as the single "The Things That We All Do for Love." "I'm Overjoyed" reached number 17 on the Hot R&B Singles chart by November of that year. In 1993, Gaye was named one of People Magazine's 50 Most Beautiful People. She signed to Ford Modeling Agency in 1994, and became the new face of Armani. In 1995, Gaye sang the title track on a tribute album of her father, Inner City Blues: The Music of Marvin Gaye.

For three years, Gaye both collaborated with and dated singer-songwriter Prince. During this time, she recorded at least four songs with him. A duet, "1000 Hugs and Kisses" and solo track, "Snowman," are thus far officially unreleased, but have managed to make their way into circulation amongst fans. Another duet, "Love Sign," was released on the 1-800-NEW-FUNK compilation album in 1994, along with another track with no Prince contribution, "A Woman's Gotta Have It." Gaye provided backing vocals on "We March" for Prince's 1995 album The Gold Experience, and on the title track to the Girl 6 soundtrack, released in 1996.

Gaye has candidly admitted that during this time she had experienced a long, personal battle with drug abuse, which she successfully overcame in 1996. In addition to these projects, she starred in a Prince-produced European TV special called The Beautiful Experience, consisting of a loose storyline to promote new material from Prince (most of which would be released throughout the next few years).

She sang alongside other artists to re-record and release her father's single "What's Going On" to benefit AIDS research in 2001. She appeared with several celebrities in the music video for Luther Vandross' 2003 song "Dance with My Father", collectively filling in for Vandross who had suffered a stroke at the time.

At one point, she worked with R. Kelly on two as-yet-unreleased singles, "Work It" and "Just Because," which interpolates the Gap Band's "Oops Up Side Your Head." In 2008, three tracks by Gaye appeared for sale at AmieStreet.com in EP form. Titled Language of Love, it contains the tracks "Quarter to Three" and "Midas Lover," along with the title track.

=== Acting ===
She began her acting career in 2001, debuting in Michael Mann's Ali as Belinda Ali. A film reviewer described Gaye as "startlingly good" in the role. Another viewed her as the best of the actresses who portrayed Ali's wives.

The following year, Gaye replaced Aaliyah, who died in a plane crash shortly after the filming of The Matrix sequels began, for the role of Zee, the wife of Harold Perrineau's character Link. Gaye was nominated for an NAACP Image Award for portraying Zee in The Matrix Revolutions.

She also provided the voice of the unnamed Hero Girl in 2004's The Polar Express. Gaye portrayed preacher's wife Charlene Frank in The Gospel (2005). She appeared in Crash (2004) and portrayed Lola, an ex-girlfriend of Ice Cube's character, in XXX: State of the Union (2005).

In July 2006, Gaye was added to the cast of Law & Order: Criminal Intent as a replacement for Courtney B. Vance as the new Assistant District Attorney. However, just as the series began production for its sixth season, she left the show, citing "creative differences." Gaye was replaced by Theresa Randle, who left after filming only two episodes.

== Filmography ==
=== Film ===
Year	Title	Role	Notes
1989	Harlem Nights	Patron	
2001	Ali	Belinda Ali	
2003	The Matrix Reloaded	Zee	
2003	The Matrix Revolutions	Zee	
2004	Crash	Karen	
2004	The Polar Express	Hero Girl Holly (voice)	Also motion-capture
2005	XXX: State of the Union	Lola Jackson	
2005	The Gospel	Charlene Taylor Frank	
2009	Blood and Bone	Tamara	Direct-to-video; last role before retiring

=== Video games ===
Year	Title	Role	Notes
2004	The Polar Express	Hero Girl	
2005	The Matrix Online	Zee	
2005	The Matrix: Path of Neo	Zee	Archive footage only

== Awards/nominations ==
- Black Reel Awards
  - 2002, Best Supporting Actress: Ali (Winner)
  - 2006, Best Actress: The Gospel (Nominated)
- Image Awards
  - 2004, Outstanding Supporting Actress in a Motion Picture: The Matrix Revolutions (Nominated)

== Discography ==
=== Albums ===
- Love for the Future (Third Stone/Atlantic, 1992)
- Language of Love (AmieStreet.com, 2008)

=== Singles ===
- "I'm Overjoyed" (Third Stone/Atlantic, 1992)
- "The Things That We All Do for Love" (Third Stone/Atlantic, 1993)
- "Love Sign" duet with Prince (NPG, 1994)
