= Marvin Gay Sr. =

American minister, father of Marvin Gaye (1914–1998)

The Reverend Marvin Gay Sr.
- Gay Sr. at his sentencing in September 1984
- Born: Marvin Pentz Gay; October 1, 1914; Jessamine County, Kentucky, U.S.
- Died: October 10, 1998 (aged 84); Culver City, California, U.S.
- Occupation: Minister
- Criminal charge: Voluntary manslaughter
- Criminal penalty: Six-year suspended sentence, five years probation
- Spouse: Alberta Cooper (m. 1935; div. 1984)
- Children: 5, including Marvin Gaye and Frankie Gaye
- Relatives: Nona Gaye (granddaughter)

Marvin Pentz Gay Sr. (October 1, 1914 – October 10, 1998) was an American Pentecostal minister. He was the father of recording artists Marvin Gaye and Frankie Gaye and gained notoriety after shooting and killing his son Marvin Jr. on April 1, 1984, following an argument at their home.

== Early life ==
Gay was born the third of 13 surviving children to George and Mamie Gay on October 1, 1914, on a farm along Catnip Hill Pike in Jessamine County, Kentucky, and was raised in Lexington. He had a troubled childhood, where his physically abusive father would often beat his mother, him, and his siblings.

According to Gay's wife, Alberta, Gay's family life consisted of constant violence, involving domestic abuse and shootings. "Gays against Gays", she told author David Ritz. When Gay was still a child, he and his mother joined a Pentecostal church, the House of God. Gay moved to Washington, D.C., in his late teens to pursue a career as a minister of a House of God church there.

== Marriage and family ==
While in Washington, Gay met his future wife, Alberta Cooper, whom he married on July 2, 1935. They bought a small house in southeastern Washington, D.C., at 1617 First Street SW, which was only a few blocks away from the Anacostia River. The street was nicknamed "Simple City" for its being "half-city, half-country". Alberta already had a son named Michael, but Gay sent Michael to live with his sister-in-law, Pearl.

Over a year after marrying, they had their first child, a daughter they named Jeanne, in December 1936. On April 2, 1939, their first son, Marvin Pentz Jr., was born. Son Frankie (born Frances) and daughter Zeola followed shortly afterwards. In 1970, Gay fathered a son named Antwaun Carey with another woman, as a result of one of his extramarital affairs.

== Ministry work ==
On one of his first missions as preacher at a church in Norristown, Pennsylvania, Gay impressed the congregation, and his church later made him Bishop. According to his son Marvin, his father was known as a healer. Gay eventually settled as a minister of a local House of God church. When his son was around four or five, his father brought him to church congregations and revivals to sing for audiences.

According to relatives, the elder Marvin Gay was a passable self-taught piano player. He bought a secondhand piano at a rummage sale and coached his son in piano lessons, which the younger Marvin Gay learned by ear, and it was one of the few stable times in the father and son's relationship. Marvin Sr. nurtured Marvin Jr.'s musical talents, so long as he stuck with liturgical music.

However, by the late 1940s, Gay had left the House of God to join another sect called the House of the Living God, but soon returned to the House of God to head its Board of Apostles in the early 1950s. Gay left the House of God altogether in the mid-1950s, after not being named Chief Apostle of the church, and, according to his son, "that's when my father lost his healing powers".

== Personal life ==
=== Marriage, family life, and relationship with Marvin Gaye ===
In most accounts, Gay was described as a strict and sometimes overbearing father to his four children. According to his children, Gay would make them observe an extended Sabbath, which was every Saturday. Gay was against the Christian tradition of attending church on Sunday, accusing Christians of violating God's commandment to keep the "Lord's Day", which he contended was Saturday.

According to Gay's daughter Jeanne, he was someone who never "spared the rod, he was very, very strict", in reference to the saying "spare the rod, spoil the child". Gay also would question his children on Biblical passages, administering beatings if they answered wrong. All four of Gay's children had problems with bed wetting, which led to more beatings.

Gay administered most of his harshest punishments on Marvin Jr. According to Marvin's sister, Jeanne, from the age of seven well into his teenage years, Marvin's life consisted of "brutal whippings", since Gay would strike him for any shortcoming, including putting his hairbrush in the wrong place or coming home from school a minute late. Marvin later stated, "It wasn't simply that my father beat me, though that was bad enough. By the time I was twelve, there wasn't an inch on my body that hadn't been bruised and beaten by him." He also said that "living with Father was like living with a king, an all-cruel, changeable, cruel and all-powerful king". Gaye further stated to David Ritz, "if it wasn't for Mother, who was always there to console me and praise me for my singing, I think I would have been one of those child suicides you read about in the papers."

Alberta Gay later stated that her husband hated Marvin Jr., as she told David Ritz in 1979:

My husband never wanted Marvin, and he never liked him. He used to say he didn't think he was really his child. I told him that was nonsense. He knew Marvin was his. But for some reason, he didn't love Marvin, and what's worse, he didn't want me to love Marvin either. Marvin wasn't very old before he understood that.

Conversely, Gay said this about Marvin:

It was important that I have a male child. A namesake is what I wanted. The day he was born, I felt he was destined for greatness. I thanked God for the blessing of his life. I thanked God for Marvin. I knew he was a special child.

According to Jeanne Gay, her father never held a job for longer than three years. Gay worked briefly in the post office and at Western Union, but a back injury laid him off early and when explaining why he left the latter job, Gay stated to Ritz that people were working on the "day of the Sabbath". Eventually, Gay withdrew from social life, developing alcoholism and practicing cross-dressing, which humiliated his son.

Due to this difficulty, Gay's wife provided for most of the family's income working as a domestic worker. As Marvin grew older, his relationship with his father worsened and Gay often threw his son out for allegations of misbehavior. Neighbors of the Gay family, as well as other students at school, according to Frankie Gay, often teased them for their name, along with their father's manner and religion. Gay's sons often found themselves having to confront the neighbors, vocally defending their father and their religion.

According to Alberta, Gay began to drink heavily in the 1950s, only furthering the friction in his relationship with Marvin and "he never did develop any love for the boy." As a teenager, Marvin Jr. attempted to leave home for good following one big fight by enlisting in the US Air Force; a move which the younger Gay later admitted was a bad idea, as he found himself under superiors who had similar authoritarian leanings as his father.

Following Marvin's musical career beginnings, he refused to be in the same room with his father for a number of years. This decision led to Marvin adding an "e" to his surname, which, it was stated, was done to quiet any rumors of his own sexual orientation, to emulate his idol Sam Cooke who had also used a stage name with a silent "e", and to add more distance from his father.

=== Son's fame and relocation to Los Angeles ===
After Marvin had found musical stardom at Motown, he purchased a house on the corner of Fifteenth and Varnum in a black middle-class section of Washington, D.C., and moved his parents out of the projects and into the new house, where the couple would reside until the early 1970s. Alberta finally stopped working so that she could enjoy the security of owning a house, and the new residence was spacious, with large outside porches, but Marvin did not visit often due to his strained relationship with his father.

However, by 1968, Marvin extended an olive branch, giving his father a Cadillac as a present, but he said that his father's response was not affecting. Four years later, Marvin reunited with his parents in Washington, D.C., after the city honored Gaye with a day in his honor called Marvin Gaye Day, a day, Marvin later said, on which he felt he had made his father "proud".

In 1974, dressed in a female wig and clothing, Gay appeared on his son's Midnight Special episode. In 1973, Marvin bought his parents a neo-Tudor house in the West Adams district of Los Angeles after moving them to California. By this time, Gay, a longtime alcoholic, had proven to be too difficult to continue his ministry and his marriage to Alberta would grow more contentious with his drinking.

By the early 1980s, Gay's marriage to Alberta had deteriorated and, according to his wife in 1984, the couple had not shared the same bed in nearly 10 years, and they were now sleeping in separate bedrooms as a result.

=== Fatal shooting of Marvin Gaye ===
In October 1983, after months in Washington, D.C., Marvin returned to the West Adams home located at Gramercy Place. Gay often told his children, "I brought you into this world, I can take you out." On Christmas Day, 1983, Marvin gave his father an unregistered .38 caliber Smith & Wesson pistol to protect him from intruders and murderers after the younger Gaye, heavily addicted to cocaine, felt someone was really plotting to kill him. The elder Gaye kept the gun because he felt "protected".

On March 31, 1984, Gay was angry because he could not locate a missing insurance policy document and he accused Alberta of misplacing the letter. Marvin awoke from his sleep and commanded his father to leave Alberta alone; however, neither father nor son physically attacked each other that night.

Around 12:30 p.m. (PST) the following day, Gay began arguing with Alberta again over the missing insurance letter. After he was heard yelling from downstairs, his son, dressed in his maroon robe, shouted back downstairs that if he wanted to talk to his mother, he should do it in person. When Gay initially refused, Marvin warned him not to enter his room, according to interviews from Alberta, the only witness to the shooting. When he did enter, his son angrily shoved his father into the hallway, then hit him. The fight continued in Marvin's bedroom, where Marvin reportedly struck his father and kicked and punched him severely. Alberta successfully separated the men and convinced Marvin to leave the room.

At approximately 12:38 p.m. (PST), minutes after returning to his own bedroom, Gay came back to his son's bedroom with the .38 pistol and shot him. The bullet penetrated Marvin's vital organs, including his heart. Gay then walked forward and shot him a second time in the shoulder at point-blank range. According to his daughter-in-law Irene, Gay hid the gun in his bedroom pillow, and she later retrieved it for the police. He then went outside and sat on the front porch and awaited his arrest, which came after police discovered Marvin's body and confirmed that Gay had shot his son. Marvin Gaye's body was later taken to California Hospital Medical Center, where he was pronounced dead on arrival at 1:01 p.m. PST.

During his first police interview, Gay stated that he did not mean to kill his son, but that he had been scared that he would be hurt and only shot him in self-defense. When the police asked him if he loved his son, Gay softly told them, "Let's say I didn't dislike him." He was promptly charged with first-degree murder for his son's death.

=== Aftermath, divorce from wife, final years, and death ===
After being taken to the Los Angeles County Jail, Gay Sr. was held on a $100,000 bail. The bail was eventually reduced to $30,000, and Gay's estranged wife Alberta posted the bond via a bondsman. Aware of Gay's failing health, doctors examined him in May and discovered a benign walnut-sized brain tumor. The brain tumor would later play a factor in preliminary hearings of the trial against him, with his lawyers stating that the tumor might have played a part in Gay shooting his son. However, the judge in the case reasoned that Gay was competent to stand trial and that he knew what he had done.

After results of Marvin's autopsy showed that he had traces of cocaine and PCP in his system, and pictures were shown of Gay after he was brought into custody, showing injuries from his final fight with his son, Judge Gordon Ringer agreed to let Gay enter a plea bargain. Gay pleaded no contest to a charge of voluntary manslaughter on September 20, 1984.

During the sentencing hearing two months later on November 2, Gay was allowed to talk. A tearful Gay, 70, told the court:

If I could bring him back, I would. I was afraid of him. I thought I was going to get hurt. I didn't know what was going to happen. I'm really sorry for everything that happened. I loved him. I wish he could step through this door right now. I'm paying the price now.

Following this, Gay was given a six-year suspended sentence and five years of probation for the shooting. He was also prohibited from owning any firearms or drinking alcohol for the remainder of his life. During this time, Alberta Gay had filed for divorce after 49 years of marriage. Gay eventually returned briefly to the Gramercy Place residence, but health issues forced him to move to a nursing home, first in Inglewood around 1986, and in the final years of his life, to a nursing home in Culver City, California, where Gay died of pneumonia on October 10, 1998.
