= Frankie Gaye =

American singer (1941–2001)

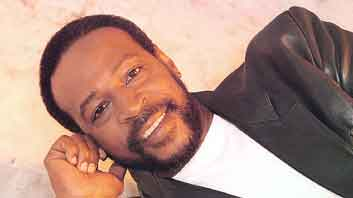
- Born: Frances Timothy Gay; November 15, 1941; Washington, D.C., U.S.
- Died: December 28, 2001 (aged 60); Los Angeles, California, U.S.
- Occupation: Singer
- Years active: 1958–2001
- Spouse(s): Judy Tench Irene Duncan (m. 1978)
- Children: 5
- Parents: Marvin Gay Sr. (father); Alberta Gay (mother)
- Relatives: Marvin Gaye (brother); Nona Gaye (niece)
- Musical career
- Genres: Pop; soul; R&B
- Instrument: Vocals
- Label: Motown

Frances Timothy Gaye (né Gay; November 15, 1941 – December 28, 2001) was an American recording artist and the brother of Marvin Gaye. Gaye's recollections of his tenure in the Vietnam War inspired Marvin's song "What's Happening, Brother," from the album What's Going On.

== Early life ==
Gaye was born in Washington, D.C., the third of four children born to Alberta Williams and Marvin Gay Sr. in 1941. Both Frankie and elder brother Marvin sang, first in church and then with local doo-wop groups. Frankie had several jobs in Washington, D.C. before answering the draft to serve his country during the Vietnam War at 25; he served as a radio disk jockey in the army. In 1970, Frankie returned to civilian life in D.C. Emotional conversations between Frankie and Marvin over Frankie's horrific recollections of the war led to Marvin to compose the song "What's Happening, Brother", later issued for Marvin's album, What's Going On, released in 1971.

== Career ==
Starting in the mid-1970s, Frankie began working with his brother, joining him on the road during Gaye's concert tours and sometimes, to test audience reactions, Marvin would place Frankie onstage first before he arrived. Like his brother and, later, their sister Zeola, Frankie added an "e" to his surname. In 1977, Frankie participated in background vocals for Marvin's hit, "Got to Give It Up, Pt. 1" and contributed co-composition rights for music for the 1979 film, Penitentiary. Frankie and his second wife (later widow), Irene, were next door to his parents' house on April 1, 1984, when Frankie's brother was shot and killed by their father after an argument. In 1989, Frankie signed with Motorcity Records and recorded two singles, "Extraordinary Girl" and "My Brother". The latter song featured in the 1990 album of the same name.

== Personal life ==
In 1972, Frankie relocated to Los Angeles where he married his first wife, Judy Tench; the couple had two daughters, Christy and Denise. After their divorce, Frankie dated Irene Duncan, a Scottish woman, after meeting her in London. They were married in 1978 and had three children: daughters April (b. 1983) son Frankie Jr. (b. 1992) and Fiona (b. 1993). In 1999, Frankie began working on his memoir, Marvin Gaye: My Brother. The book was released posthumously in 2003.

=== Death ===
Frankie died of complications following a heart attack on December 28, 2001, at the age of 60. Francis Gaye is buried at Forest Lawn Memorial Park (Hollywood Hills).

== Discography ==
=== Albums ===
- 1979: Penitentiary
- 1990: My Brother
- 1996: The Very Best of Frankie Gaye

=== Singles ===
- 1989: "Extraordinary Girl"
- 1990: "My Brother"
