= Alberta Gay =

Mother of musician Marvin Gaye

- Born: Alberta Williams Cooper; January 1, 1913; Rocky Mount, North Carolina, U.S.
- Died: May 8, 1987 (aged 74); Burbank, California, U.S.
- Occupations: Domestic worker, schoolteacher
- Spouse: Marvin Gay Sr. (m. 1935; div. 1984)
- Children: 5, including Marvin Gaye, Frankie Gaye
- Relatives: Nona Gaye (granddaughter)

Alberta Williams Gay (née Cooper; January 1, 1913 – May 8, 1987) was the mother of five children including recording artists Marvin Gaye and Frankie Gaye. Born in Rocky Mount, North Carolina, she married the minister Marvin Gay Sr., after relocating to Washington, D.C., in her early twenties.

== Early life ==
Alberta Williams Cooper was born on New Year's Day, 1913, in Rocky Mount, North Carolina. She had three sisters, Pearl, Tolie and Zeola, and a brother, Aster, but she endured a troubled childhood while growing up in North Carolina: her father once shot at her mother during an argument. Although her mother survived, her father later died in a psychiatric hospital. Alberta told David Ritz that she felt she really did not have a father, and her family did not put her in a school until she was eight years old.

At 20 years of age, she had a child, a son named Michael. As a result, her mother sent her to live with a relative in Washington, D.C., where she met the minister Marvin Gay Sr. in 1934. After a year of dating, the couple married on July 2, 1935. The young couple first settled at an apartment located at 1617 First Street SW, only a few blocks from the Anacostia River. The First Street neighborhood was nicknamed "Simple City" owing to its being "half city, half country".

Due to his belief that he could not raise another man's child, Marvin Gay eventually sent Alberta's son, Michael, to live with Alberta's sister Pearl. According to Alberta's daughter, Jeanne, Michael Cooper did not learn that Alberta was his mother until he was a teenager. Allegedly, when Michael began living with his half-siblings, he told young Marvin to stand up against his father's abuse; when he did, Marvin Sr. responded by sending Michael to live with his aunt Zeola, another one of Alberta's sisters, in Detroit. However, Jeanne Gay said Michael Cooper had planned to move to Detroit before the alleged confrontation between father and son.

== Family life ==
=== Children ===
Marvin Sr. and Alberta had four children. The first, Mable Jeanne, was born in December 1936. Marvin Pentz Jr. followed on April 2, 1939. A younger son, Frances "Frankie", followed in November 1941, with a younger daughter, Zeola (named after her aunt), following in 1945. With her husband, she converted to the strict House of God, an eccentric Christian sect that took its teachings from Hebrew Pentecostalism. Since her husband barely worked jobs, Alberta worked as a domestic worker, cleaning houses in the Maryland and Virginia areas to provide income for her family. Gay Sr. fathered another son, Antwaun Carey Gay, in 1970 by another woman during one of his extramarital affairs without Alberta's knowledge.

=== Marriage to husband and domestic work ===
Alberta often found herself caught up in the middle of her husband's level of brutal "disciplining" of their children. She also confided that her husband hated young Marvin. She told Ritz in 1979, "My husband never wanted Marvin. And he never liked him. He used to say he didn't think he was really his child. I told him that was nonsense. He knew Marvin was his. But for some reason, he didn't love Marvin and, what's worse, he didn't want me to love Marvin either. Marvin wasn't very old before he understood that." By the end of her husband's ministerial period, he developed an addiction to alcohol and began developing an interest in cross-dressing. Alberta later explained that her husband "liked soft clothing. Soft things of all kinds attracted him. He liked to wear my panties, my shoes, my gowns, even my nylon hose. Marvin saw him like that sometimes."

When asked if she had thought of leaving or divorcing her husband, Alberta admitted she did but "felt sorry" for her husband due to his own abusive upbringing and stuck by him because he needed help. She also said that her husband wasn't ready for children because he didn't understand how to treat them and prior to her death, she told David Ritz that she had thought of leaving her husband many times before he shot Marvin, but had been unable to do so due to a lack of courage. Her daughter Jeanne stated her mother's strong beliefs in the House of God religion prevented her from divorcing her father. Marvin Gaye would say of his mother as someone who "lived by principles". Of his mother, Marvin said, "her kindness and generosity were legendary. She took in people and fed neighbors, even when we were still dirt poor. The woman suffered so, and yet her suffering seemed to make her stronger. The older I've gotten, the more I've wished that all women were like my mother." In comparison to his volatile relationship with his father, Gaye said, "if it wasn't for Mother, who was always there to console me and praise my singing, I think I would have been one of those child suicide cases you read about in the papers."

Alberta's marriage to Marvin Sr. was always contentious and he was a womanizer who cheated on her and sometimes violently abused her. He was also resentful that he was not the breadwinner due to earning very little as a pastor.

=== Marvin's marriage to Anna and house moves ===
When Gaye married his first wife, Anna, his duet partner and friend Kim Weston said that Anna reminded him strongly of his mother. Gaye continually supported his mother throughout his life, and after becoming successful, he moved his parents out of the by now derelict projects and into a large house that he had bought for them on Fifteenth and Varnum in the black middle-class section of Washington, D.C. In 1973, he moved his parents to a residence at 2101 Gramercy Place in the West Adams district of Los Angeles, and the rest of the family moved to California as well.

=== Marvin's depression ===
By 1979, Marvin had moved his belongings there and David Ritz interviewed him at the house that year as they worked on a biography. Noting her son's battle with depression, Alberta spent months with her son in Maui and in London.

=== Kidney surgery and Marvin's final years ===
In October 1982, Alberta Gay was rushed to a hospital in Los Angeles after falling critically ill to a near-fatal kidney infection that required surgery. Her sons Marvin and Frankie rushed from Belgium to be by her side, but Marvin Sr. was in Washington, D.C., to fix up and sell their old house in Varnum Place and unwilling to return to California to support Alberta during her surgery or recuperation. Marvin Jr. believed that Alberta was owed half the money in the sale of the old Washington, D.C., house, but Marvin Sr. would not acknowledge that he had sold it.

During Gaye's final years alive, he and Alberta slept together in Alberta's bedroom. Around that time, Gaye's parents had virtually separated, with Marvin Sr. sleeping in an adjacent bedroom. By the time of the events of April 1, 1984, the couple had not slept in the same bed for almost a decade.

=== Son's death ===
On March 31, 1984, Alberta and her husband had an argument over misplaced business documents, including an important insurance policy, which Alberta was blamed for misplacing. When the argument spilled over to Marvin's bedroom, Marvin awoke from a sleep and immediately took his mother's side, demanding his father to leave her alone. Gay Sr. left the room without incident that afternoon but, according to Alberta, carried on rambling through the house.

The following day, April 1, the arguments started again. This time, Gay Sr. yelled angrily for his wife to come downstairs from Marvin's room. Marvin again intervened, telling his father if he wanted to talk to her to do it directly. When Gay Sr. refused, Marvin warned him not to come in his room. Ignoring Marvin's demands, Gay Sr. marched to his room to argue with Alberta, prompting a despondent and livid Marvin to yell at him, and then pushed and shoved him out of the room into the hallway. According to Alberta, Marvin hit his father and also kicked him. Alberta eventually convinced her son to leave his father's room. At approximately 12:38 pm (PST), Marvin Sr. returned to Marvin's room carrying an unlicensed Smith & Wesson .38 caliber pistol that Marvin had given him as a Christmas present, shooting Marvin in his right chest area. The shot perforated his vital organs, including his heart, and proved to be fatal. Marvin was shot again at point-blank range. Alberta had already run out of the room following the first shot and pleaded for her husband to not shoot her next. Marvin Gaye later died from his wounds after arriving at the California Hospital Medical Center. Alberta Gay was the only other person present at the murder of her son committed by his father.

== Final years ==
Following her son's murder, Alberta Gaye filed for divorce from her husband after 49 years of marriage. Two days later, however, she posted a bond to bail him out of jail after his arrest for their son's murder, because she still sympathized with him and did not believe he should suffer any longer. At her son's funeral, she kissed her son on his forehead.

In 1986, Alberta founded the Marvin P. Gaye Jr. Memorial Foundation in dedication to her son to help people with drug and alcohol problems. It opened following her death in 1987.

=== Death ===
Alberta struggled with bone cancer for the remainder of her life and was taken care of by her daughter Jeanne at her Burbank home.

She died on May 8, 1987, at St. Joseph Medical Center in Burbank, California, after years of suffering from bone cancer, at the age of 74.
