= California Hospital Medical Center =

Coordinates: 34.0372°N 118.2654°W

- Dignity Health

Geography
- Location: 1401 S. Grand Ave, Los Angeles, California, United States

Organization
- Care system: Non-Profit
- Type: Community

Services
- Emergency department: Level II trauma center
- Beds: 318

History
- Founded: 1887

Links
- Website: http://www.chmcla.org/
- Lists: Hospitals in California

Dignity Health-California Hospital Medical Center is located in the South Park district of downtown Los Angeles, California at 1401 S. Grand Avenue. The 318-bed community hospital has been serving downtown and its neighboring communities for well over a century. Dignity Health-California Hospital Medical Center is known for its wide range of medical services – from obstetrics and gynecology, to orthopedics and cardiology. The hospital operates as a Level II Trauma Center, and its emergency department treats over 70,000 patients each year. The hospital's neighbors include Crypto.com Arena, "L.A. Live" and the Fashion Institute of Design & Merchandising.

== Services ==
California Hospital's services include: Emergency Medicine, Gynecology (The Los Angeles Center for Women's Health), Cardiology (Cath Lab and Open Heart Surgery), Intensive Care Unit, Transitional Care Unit/Rehabilitation Services, Obstetrics, Neonatal Intensive Care Unit, Surgical Services, Cancer Center.

== History ==
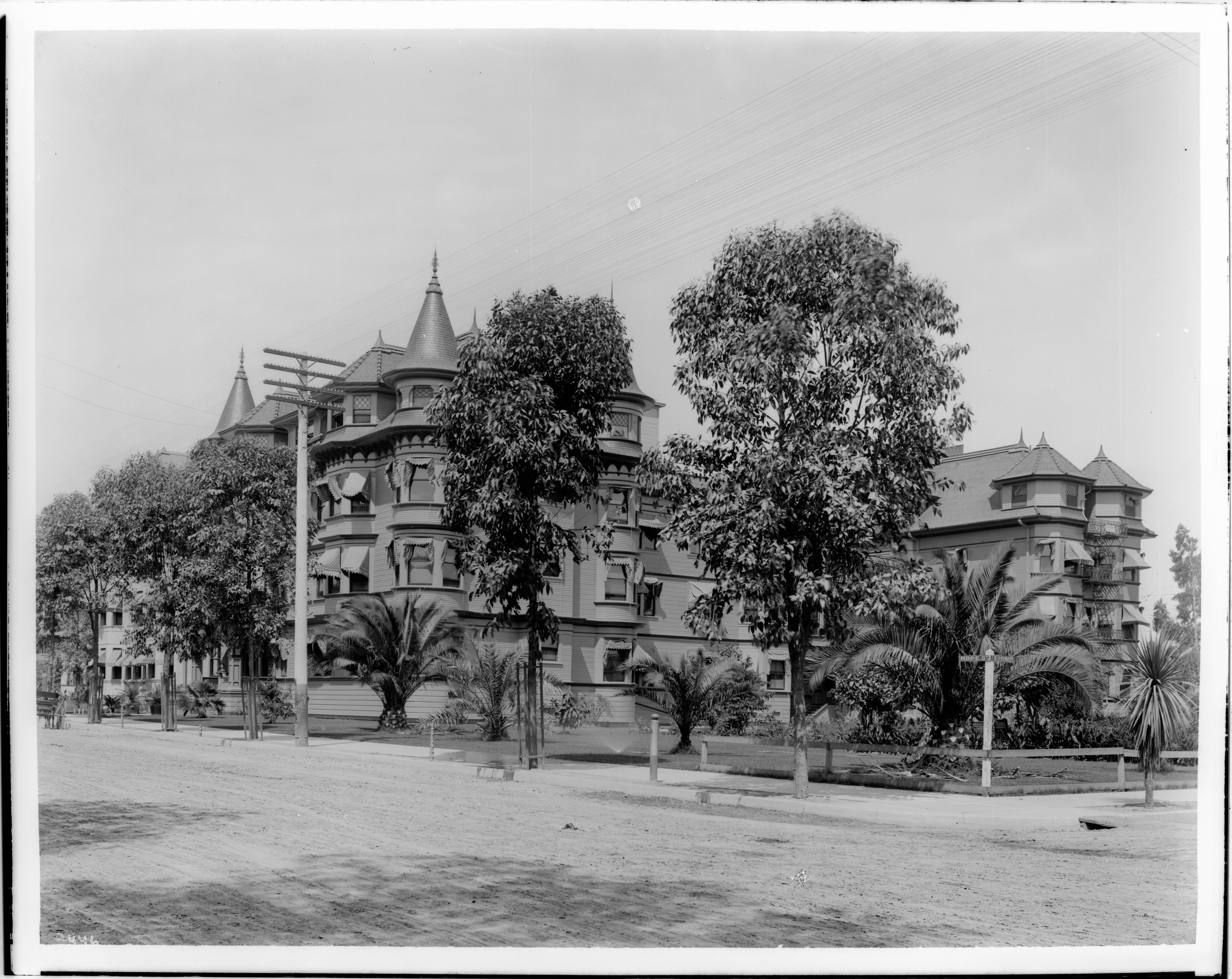
View of the exterior of the California Hospital looking south on Hope Street and Fifteenth Street, c. 1910

California Hospital Medical Center (CHMC) was founded in 1887 by Dr. Walter Lindley and two other physicians. It was originally a three-story building located at 315 W. Sixth Street in Los Angeles. By 1902, CHMC turned into the largest and best-equipped physician-owned hospital west of Chicago and less than 25 years later, CHMC's old frame buildings were replaced by a more modern nine-story brick building, resulting in another famous "first" – it was the first fireproof hospital in Los Angeles. Between 1870 and 1910, hospitals moved from the periphery to the center of medical education and medical practice. And the effects of this significant change rippled outward, altering the relationship of doctors to hospitals and to one another, and shaping the development of the hospital system as a whole.

Today, Dignity Health-California Hospital Medical Center is a 318-bed acute care hospital that provides medical care to the dynamic community of downtown Los Angeles and its surrounding neighborhoods.
