= The Supremes discography =

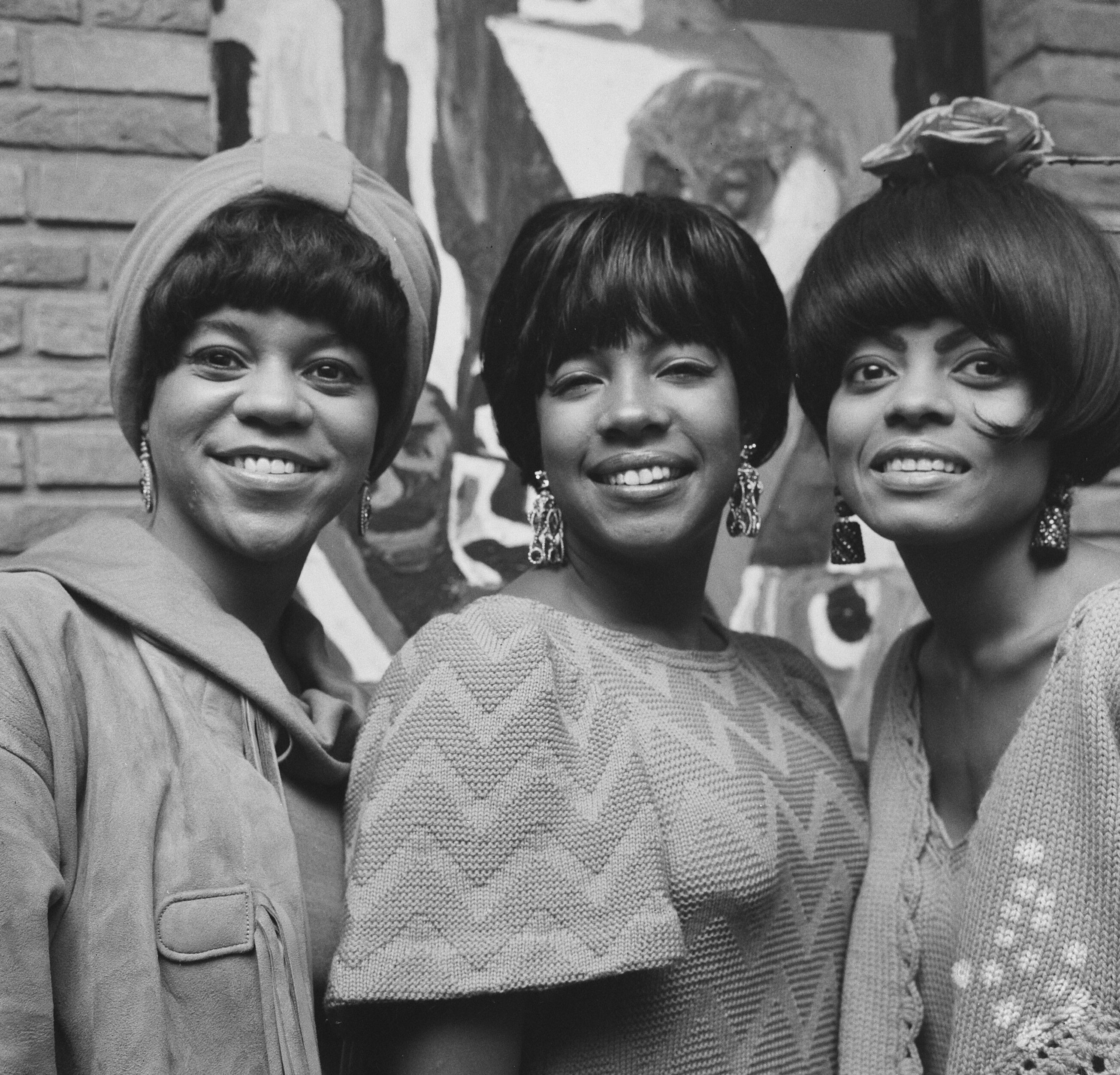
- Florence Ballard, Mary Wilson and Diana Ross in 1965
- Studio albums: 29
- Soundtrack albums: 2
- Live albums: 4
- Compilation albums: 32
- Singles: 66
- US No. 1 Singles: 12
- Promotional singles: 3

American girl group The Supremes has released 29 studio albums, four live albums, two soundtrack albums, 32 compilation albums, four box sets, 66 singles and three promotional singles. The Supremes are tied with eight other artists for the seventh most successful American group of all time, and the 26th greatest artist of all time on the US Billboard charts; with 12 number-one songs on the Billboard Hot 100 (the fifth-best total in the chart's history) and three number-one albums on the Billboard 200. The Supremes were the first artist to accumulate five consecutive number-one singles on the US Hot 100 and the first female group to top the Billboard 200 albums chart with The Supremes A' Go-Go (1966). In 2017, Billboard ranked The Supremes as the number-one girl group of all time, publishing, 'although there have been many girl group smashes in the decades since the Supremes ruled the Billboard charts, no collective has yet to challenge their, for lack of a better word, supremacy.' In 2019, the UK Official Charts Company placed 7 Supremes songs—"You Can't Hurry Love" (16), "Baby Love" (23), "Stop! In the Name of Love" (56), "Where Did Our Love Go?" (59), "You Keep Me Hangin' On" (78), "Come See About Me" (94) and "Stoned Love" (99)—on The Official Top 100 Motown songs of the Millennium chart, which ranks Motown releases by their all-time UK downloads and streams.

In 2020, Insider.com named The Supremes "the best-selling vocal group to date", after Ebony estimated The Supremes' record sales at 50 million in 1980 and Euronews reported total sales exceeding 100 million records in 2014. This would make the group one of the best-selling music artists of all time. However, Motown refused to submit their books for industry audit, until the 1980s, years after the group disbanded. As such, The Supremes' first certifications include: the Anthology compilation album, which peaked at number 66 on the US Billboard 200 and was certified Gold by the Recording Industry Association of America (RIAA) on January 21, 1986; and the Love Supreme (1988) compilation, which peaked at number ten on the UK Albums Chart and was certified Silver by the British Phonographic Industry (BPI) on January 27, 1989. To put this into perspective, the group's first hits compilation, Greatest Hits (1967), topped both the US and UK albums charts upon release. Despite selling over one million copies in the US, with 89 total weeks on the Billboard 200; and being the UK's fourth "longest-reigning Top 40 girl group album ever", with a total of 60 weeks in the top 40; Greatest Hits (1967) is not certified by either the RIAA or BPI.

== Overview ==
=== The Supremes (1960–1967) ===
After several non-charting releases, the Supremes made their first appearance on the US Hot 100 in August, 1962 with "Your Heart Belongs to Me". They released their debut album, Meet The Supremes (1962), featuring the singles, "I Want a Guy", "Buttered Popcorn", "Your Heart Belongs to Me" and "Let Me Go the Right Way". The Supremes' second studio album Where Did Our Love Go (1964) featured their first three consecutive number-ones and million-sellers in the US; "Where Did Our Love Go", "Baby Love" and "Come See About Me"; as well as the international hit, "When the Lovelight Starts Shining Through His Eyes". "Where Did Our Love Go" sold over 2 million copies in the US alone.

This was followed by the albums A Bit of Liverpool (1964), The Supremes Sing Country, Western and Pop (1965) and We Remember Sam Cooke (1965). Their sixth studio album, More Hits by The Supremes, contained the million-sellers "Stop! In the Name of Love" "Back in My Arms Again", and "Nothing but Heartaches". In 1965, they released the live album The Supremes at the Copa alongside their seventh studio album, Merry Christmas. The Supremes' eighth studio album, I Hear a Symphony (1966), features two million-sellers; the title track, and "My World Is Empty Without You". The Supremes A' Go-Go (1966), their ninth studio album, contains the million-seller "You Can't Hurry Love". Their tenth studio album, The Supremes Sing Holland–Dozier–Holland (1967), featured the million-sellers "You Keep Me Hangin' On" and "Love Is Here and Now You're Gone". Included in the Greatest Hits (1967) compilation was the million-selling single "The Happening".

=== Diana Ross & the Supremes (1967–1970) ===
Diana Ross & the Supremes released the million-seller "Reflections" and "In and Out of Love" from their twelfth studio album, Reflections (1968). Their fourteenth studio album, Diana Ross & the Supremes Join the Temptations featured the Platinum single, "I'm Gonna Make You Love Me". This was followed by the single "Love Child", which sold 2 million copies by the end of 1968 in the US alone. In 1968, they released their first soundtrack album, TCB. In 1969, they released the albums Let the Sunshine In andTogether, a collaboration with The Temptations. The group's eighteenth studio album, Cream of the Crop, was the last released with Diana Ross. It contains "Someday We'll Be Together"; the single was certified Platinum.

=== The Supremes (1970–1977) ===
As The Supremes, with Jean Terrell as lead singer, they released three studio albums in 1970: Right On, The Magnificent 7 (a collaboration with the Four Tops), and New Ways but Love Stays. Touch (1971) includes the single, "Nathan Jones"; it became a million-selling single. Floy Joy (1972) was their twenty-fifth studio album; the single of the same name was the twentieth million-selling single by the group. After a two-year hiatus, with original member Mary Wilson, they released their twenty-seventh studio album The Supremes (1975). High Energy (1976), their twenty-eighth studio album, featured the group's last US top 40 hit, "I'm Gonna Let My Heart Do the Walking". Mary, Scherrie & Susaye (1976) is the twenty-ninth and final studio album by The Supremes, featuring their last single to hit the US Hot 100, "You're My Driving Wheel".

== Albums ==
=== Studio albums ===
List of albums, with selected chart positions and certifications
Title	Album details	Peak chart positions							Sales (Note: US sales figures are physical sales only, as they were reported before the introduction of digital downloads or album-equivalent units.)	Certifications
Title	Album details	US	US R&B /HH	US Record World	CAN	GER	NOR	UK	Sales	Certifications
Meet The Supremes	Released: December 9, 1962; Label: Motown (#MT 606); Format: LP, reel-to-reel, 4-track, 8-track	—	—	—	—	—	—	13 (Note: Following the success of singles "Where Did Our Love Go" and "Baby Love", in 1964, Meet The Supremes was released in the UK on Stateside (#SL 10109). The UK release has a different tracklisting, featuring songs from the US album releases: Meet The Supremes and Where Did Our Love Go. It also contains the b-side "(The Man With The) Rock & Roll Banjo Band", which would later appear on The Supremes Sing Country, Western and Pop.)	US: 74,000	
Where Did Our Love Go	Released: August 31, 1964; Label: Motown (#MT-621); Format: LP, reel-to-reel, mini-LP, 4-track, 8-track	2	1	2	—	33	—	—	US: 922,009	
A Bit of Liverpool	Released: October 16, 1964; Label: Motown (#Motown 623); Format: LP, 4-track, 8-track	21	5	13	—	—	—	—	US: 175,000	
The Supremes Sing Country, Western and Pop	Released: February 22, 1965; Label: Motown (#M-625); Format: LP, 4-track, 8-track	79	—	62	—	—	—	—	US: 38,000	
We Remember Sam Cooke	Released: April 12, 1965; Label: Motown (#MT-629); Format: LP, 8-track	75	5	37	—	—	—	—	US: 85,000	
More Hits by The Supremes	Released: July 23, 1965; Label: Motown (#MS 627); Format: LP, reel-to-reel, 4-track, 8-track	6	2	6	—	—	—	— (Note: More Hits by The Supremes did not enter the UK Albums Chart, but peaked at number seven on Britain's Top R&B Albums (Record Mirror) chart.)		
Merry Christmas	Released: November 1, 1965; Label: Motown (#MT-638); Format: LP, reel-to-reel	— (Note: Merry Christmas did not enter the US Billboard 200, but peaked at number six on Billboard magazine's Christmas Records—Albums chart.)	—	— (Note: Merry Christmas did not enter the Record World 100 Top LP's, but peaked at number nine on the LP's Coming Up chart.)	—	—	—	—		
I Hear a Symphony	Released: February 18, 1966; Label: Motown (#Motown 643); Format: LP, reel-to-reel, 8-track	8	1	6	—	—	—	— (Note: I Hear a Symphony did not enter the UK Albums Chart, but peaked at number six on Britain's Top R&B Albums (Record Mirror) chart.)		BPI: Silver
The Supremes A' Go-Go	Released: August 25, 1966; Label: Motown (#M-649); Format: LP, 8-track, reel-to-reel	1	1	2	—	—	—	15		
The Supremes Sing Holland–Dozier–Holland	Released: January 23, 1967; Label: Motown (#M-650); Format: LP, 4-track, reel-to-reel	6	1	4	—	—	—	15		
The Supremes Sing Rodgers & Hart	Released: May 22, 1967; Label: Motown (#Motown 659); Format: LP, reel-to-reel	20	3	19	4	—	—	25		
Reflections	Released: March 25, 1968; Label: Motown (#MS-665); Format: LP, 8-track	18	3	15	—	—	20	30		
Diana Ross & the Supremes Sing and Perform "Funny Girl"	Released: August 26, 1968; Label: Motown (#MS-672); Format: LP, 4-track, 8-track	150	45	—	—	—	—	—	US: 76,508	
Diana Ross & the Supremes Join The Temptations (with The Temptations)	Released: November 8, 1968; Label: Motown (#MS-679); Format: LP, 4-track, 8-track	2	1	2	5	—	—	1		RIAA: Gold
Love Child	Released: November 13, 1968; Label: Motown (#Motown 670); Format: LP, reel-to-reel, 8-track, cassette	14	3	7	11	—	10	13		
Let the Sunshine In	Released: May 26, 1969; Label: Motown (#MS-689); Format: LP, reel-to-reel, 8-track, cassette	24	7	23	27	—	—	— (Note: Let the Sunshine In did not enter the UK Albums Chart, but peaked at number one on Britain's Top R&B Albums (Record Mirror) chart.)		
Together (with The Temptations)	Released: September 23, 1969; Label: Motown (#MS-692); Format: LP, reel-to-reel, 8-track, cassette	28	6	27	29	—	—	28		
Cream of the Crop	Released: November 3, 1969; Label: Motown (#Motown 694); Format: LP, reel-to-reel, 8-track, cassette	33	3	45	50	—	—	34		
Right On	Released: April 26, 1970; Label: Motown (#Motown 705); Format: LP, cassette	25	4	24	41	—	—	—		
The Magnificent 7 (with the Four Tops)	Released: September, 1970; Label: Motown (#MS 717); Format: LP, cassette	113	18	102	73	—	—	6	UK: 30,000 (Note: United Kingdom sales figure for The Magnificent 7, as of 1971.)	
New Ways but Love Stays	Released: October, 1970; Label: Motown (#MS 720); Format: LP, cassette	68	12	43	—	—	—	—		
The Return of the Magnificent Seven (with the Four Tops)	Released: June, 1971; Label: Motown (#MS 736); Format: LP, cassette	154	18	72	—	—	—	—		
Touch	Released: June, 1971; Label: Motown (#MS 737); Format: LP, 4-track, 8-track	85	6	66	—	—	—	40		
Dynamite (with the Four Tops)	Released: December, 1971; Label: Motown (#M 745 L); Format: LP, cassette	160	21	—	—	—	—	—		
Floy Joy	Released: May, 1972; Label: Motown (#M 7511 L); Format: LP, cassette	54	12	44	—	—	—	—		
The Supremes Produced and Arranged by Jimmy Webb	Released: November, 1972; Label: Motown (#M 756 L); Format: LP, 8-track, cassette	129	27	104	—	—	—	—		
The Supremes	Released: May, 1975; Label: Motown (#M6 828S1); Format: LP, cassette	152	25	179	—	—	—	—		
High Energy	Released: April, 1976; Label: Motown (#M6 863S1); Format: LP, 8-track, cassette	42	24	141	26	—	—	—		
Mary, Scherrie & Susaye	Released: October, 1976; Label: Motown (#M6 873S1); Format: LP	—	—	181	—	—	—	—		
"—" denotes the album failed to chart or was not released

=== Live albums ===
List of live albums, with selected chart positions and certifications
Title	Album details	Peak chart positions				
Title	Album details	US	US R&B /HH	US Record World	CAN	UK
The Supremes at the Copa	Released: November 1, 1965; Label: Motown (#M-636); Format: LP, reel-to-reel, 4-track, 8-track	11	6	10	—	—
Live at London's Talk of the Town	Released: August 26, 1968; Label: Motown (#MS-676); Format: LP, reel-to-reel, 4-track	57	6	89	—	6
Farewell	Released: April 13, 1970; Label: Motown (#MS2-708); Format: LP, reel-to-reel, 8-track, cassette	46	31	25	28	—
The Supremes Live! In Japan (Note: Japan-only; released internationally by Hip-O Select in 2004.)	Released: 1973; Label: Motown (#SWX-6031); Format: LP, quadrophonic	—	—	—	—	—
"—" denotes the album failed to chart or was not released

=== Soundtrack albums ===
List of soundtrack albums, with selected chart positions and certifications
Title	Album details	Peak chart positions					Sales	Certifications
Title	Album details	US	US R&B /HH	US Record World	CAN	UK	Sales	Certifications
The Bing Crosby Special (with Bing Crosby, Bob Hope, Miss Stella Stevens, José Feliciano)	Broadcast: October 23, 1968; Unreleased (Note: Not released commercially. Vinyl labels state, 'This album is intended for file and reference purposes only. It may not be sold, broadcast or used for any other commercial purpose.' One song from the soundtrack, "Paint Your Wagon Medley: I'm on My Way/I Talk to the Trees/I Still See Elissa/They Call the Wind Maria", featuring Diana Ross & the Supremes, was later released on the compilation Among My Souvenirs: More Treasures from the Crosby Archive.); Label: NBC; Format: LP	Commercially unreleased						
TCB (with The Temptations)	Released: December 2, 1968; Label: Motown (#MS-682); Format: LP, reel-to-reel, 4-track, 8-track, cassette	1	1	2	2	11	US: 1,000,000 (Note: United States sales figure for TCB, as of 1984.)	RIAA: Gold
G.I.T. on Broadway (with The Temptations)	Released: November 7, 1969; Label: Motown (#S-699); Format: LP	38	4	30	44	—		
"—" denotes the album failed to chart or was not released

=== Compilation albums ===
List of compilation albums, with selected chart positions and certifications
Title	Album details	Peak chart positions										Sales	Certifications
Title	Album details	US	US R&B /HH	CAN	GER	JPN	NLD	NOR	NZ	SCO	UK	Sales	Certifications
Greatest Hits	Released: September, 1967; Label: Motown (#MS-2-663); Format: LP, reel-to-reel, 4-track, 8-track, cassette	1	1	—	—	—	—	8	—	—	1	US: 1,000,000 (Note: United States sales figure for Greatest Hits, as of 1984.)	
Greatest Hits Vol. 3	Released: December, 1969; Label: Motown (#MS 702); Format: LP, reel-to-reel, 4-track, 8-track, cassette	31	5	45	—	—	—	—	—	—	—		
Greatest Hits Vol. 2	Released: 1970; Label: Motown (#STML11146); Format: LP, reel-to-reel, 8-track, cassette	—	—	—	—	—	—	—	—	—	29		
Super Deluxe	Released: 1970; Label: Tamla-Motown (#SWX-10006); Format: LP	—	—	—	—	70	—	—	—	—	—		
Diana Ross & the Supremes Anthology (version one)	Released: May, 1974; Label: Motown (#M9-794A3); Format: LP, 8-track, cassette	66	24	58	—	—	—	—	—	—	—		RIAA: Gold
20 Golden Greats	Released: 1977; Label: EMI (#EMTV5); Format: LP, cassette	—	—	—	—	—	47	—	6	—	1	UK: 1,000,000 (Note: United Kingdom sales figure for 20 Golden Greats, as of 1979.)	BPI: 2× Platinum; RMNZ: Platinum
At Their Best	Released: June, 1978; Label: Motown (#M7904R1); Format: LP	—	—	—	—	—	—	—	—	—	—		
20 Greatest Hits	Released: 1979; Label: Trent (#ADEH 46); Format: LP	—	—	—	—	—	4	—	—	—	—		
Their Greatest Hits	Released: 1980; Label: Arcade (#ADE G 122); Format: LP, cassette	—	—	—	14	—	—	—	—	—	—		
20 Greatest Hits – Compact Command Performances	Released: 1984; Label: Motown (#MCD06073MD, #72423); Format: CD	—	—	—	—	—	64	—	—	—	—		
Diana Ross & the Supremes: 25th Anniversary Collection	Released: March, 1986; Label: Motown (#5381, #6193); Format: CD, LP	112	61	—	—	—	—	—	—	—	—		
Diana Ross & the Supremes Anthology (version two)	Released: August, 1986; Label: Motown (#6198); Format: CD	—	—	—	—	—	—	—	29	—	—		
The Never-Before-Released Masters	Released: 1987; Label: Motown (#MOTD-9075); Format: CD	—	—	—	—	—	—	—	—	—	—		
Love Supreme	Released: 1988; Label: Motown (#ZL 72701); Format: LP, cassette, CD	—	—	—	—	—	—	—	—	—	10		BPI: Silver
The Supremes ('70s): Greatest Hits and Rare Classics	Released: 1991; Label: Motown (#794, #635 487); Format: CD, cassette	—	—	—	—	—	—	—	—	—	—		
The Best of Diana Ross & the Supremes: Anthology (version three)	Released: September 28, 1995; Label: Motown (#0511); Format: CD	—	—	—	—	—	—	—	—	—	—		
You Keep Me Hangin' On	Released: 1997; Label: Spectrum Music (#530 792-2); Format: CD, cassette	—	—	—	—	—	—	—	—	—	— (Note: You Keep Me Hangin' On did not enter the UK Albums Chart, but peaked at number five on the UK Budget Albums chart.)		BPI: Gold
The Ultimate Collection	Released: 1997; Label: Motown (#5308272); Format: CD, cassette	—	—	—	—	—	—	—	—	—	—		BPI: Gold
40 Golden Motown Greats	Released: November 3, 1998; Label: Polygram (#530961); Format: CD	—	—	—	—	—	—	—	—	61	35		BPI: Gold
20th Century Masters – The Millennium Collection: The Best of Diana Ross & the Supremes	Released: August 31, 1999; Label: Motown (#53731); Format: CD, cassette	200	—	—	—	—	—	—	—	—	—	US: 563,317 (Note: United States sales figure for 20th Century Masters: The Millennium Collection: The Best of Diana Ross & the Supremes, as of 2013.)	
20th Century Masters: The Millennium Collection: The Best of Diana Ross & the Supremes, Vol. 2	Released: May 16, 2000; Label: Motown (#AA121579292); Format: CD	—	—	—	—	—	—	—	—	—	—		
Diana Ross & the Supremes Anthology (version four)	Released: December 18, 2001; Label: Motown (#016409); Format: CD	—	—	—	—	—	—	—	—	—	—		
The Hits	Released: 2002; Label: Hallmark (#701222); Format: CD	—	—	—	—	—	—	—	—	50	—		
The '70s Anthology	Released: October 29, 2002; Label: Motown (#0641272); Format: CD	—	—	—	—	—	—	—	—	—	—		
Diana Ross & the Supremes: The No. 1's	Released: October 21, 2003; Label: Motown (#AAB000136802); Format: CD	72	63	—	—	279	—	18	—	25	15		BPI: Platinum; RMNZ: Platinum
Joined Together: The Complete Studio Duets	Released: April 27, 2004; Label: Motown (#9861262); Format: CD	—	—	—	—	—	—	—	—	—	—		
There's a Place for Us	Released: July 8, 2004; Label: Fontana, Hip-O Select, Motown (#AAB000266302); Format: CD	—	—	—	—	—	—	—	—	—	—		
The Supremes: Gold	Released: April 26, 2005; Label: Motown (#9881265); Format: CD	—	—	—	—	—	—	—	—	—	—		
Soul Legends	Released: July 25, 2006; Label: Motown (#9832016); Format: CD, digital download	—	—	—	—	—	86	—	—	—	—		
Let the Music Play: Supreme Rarities	Released: April 29, 2008; Label: Hip-O Select (#AAB326302); Format: CD, digital download	—	—	—	—	—	—	—	—	—	—		
The Story of the Supremes	Released: July 15, 2008; Label: Island (#5307715); Format: CD, digital download	—	—	—	—	—	—	—	—	—	—		
The Definitive Collection	Released: September 28, 2008; Label: Motown (#1780542); Format: CD, digital download	142	—	—	—	—	—	—	—	—	—		
Love Songs	Released: January 27, 2009; Label: Motown (#B001251902); Format: CD, digital download	—	—	—	—	—	—	—	—	—	—		
Super Best	Released: September 15, 2009; Label: Universal International (#PROI-1011); Format: CD	—	—	—	—	254	—	—	—	—	—		
Icon: Diana Ross & the Supremes	Released: August 31, 2010; Label: Motown (#14573); Format: CD	—	86	—	—	—	—	—	—	—	—		
The Ultimate Merry Christmas	Released: November 3, 2017; Label: Real Gone Music (#642); Format: CD	—	—	—	—	—	—	—	—	—	—		
All Time Greats	Released: November 15, 2019; Label: Spectrum Music; Format: CD, digital download, streaming	—	—	—	—	—	—	—	—	—	—		BPI: Silver
Essential	Released: August 7, 2020; Label: Spectrum Music (#5391382); Format: CD	—	—	—	—	—	—	—	—	9	49		
"—" denotes the album failed to chart or was not released

=== Remix albums ===
List of compilation albums, with selected chart positions and certifications
Title	Album details	Peak chart positions
Title	Album details	JPN
Diana Ross & the Supremes Remixes	Released: July 2, 2007; Label: Motown, Universal (#1228); Format: CD	184

=== Box sets ===
List of box sets, with selected chart positions
Title	Album details	Peak chart positions
Title	Album details	NLD
The Supremes	Released: August 29, 2000; Label: Motown (#012 159 415-2); Format: CD	—
This Is the Story: The '70s Albums, Vol. 1 – 1970–1973: The Jean Terrell Years	Released: December 12, 2006; Label: Hip-O Select, Motown (#B0005938-02); Format: CD, digital download	—
Magnificent: The Complete Studio Duets	Released: September 29, 2009; Label: Hip-O Select (#2710411); Format: CD, digital download	—
Let Yourself Go: The '70s Albums, Vol 2 – 1974–1977: The Final Sessions	Released: May 17, 2011; Label: Hip-O Select, Motown (#B0014961-02); Format: CD, digital download	—
50th Anniversary: The Singles Collection 1961–1969	Released: October 24, 2011; Label: Hip-O Select, Motown (#B0015943-02); Format: CD, digital download	95
"—" denotes the album failed to chart or was not released

== Extended plays ==
List of extended plays, with selected chart positions
Title	EP details	Peak chart positions
Title	EP details	UK EPs
The Supremes Hits	Released: 1965; Label: Tamla Motown, EMI (#TME 2008); Format: EP	6

== Singles ==
=== 1960s ===
List of singles, with selected chart positions, sales and certifications, showing year released and album nameAll records released on Motown Records except for the Primettes' "Tears of Sorrow" b/w "Pretty Baby", issued on Lu Pine Records.
A-side title B-side title	Year	Peak chart positions										Sales (Note: UK sales figures are based solely on digital downloads and audio streams.)	Certifications	Album
A-side title B-side title	Year	US	AUS	BEL (WA)	CAN	GER	ISL	NLD	NZ	SGP	UK	Sales	Certifications	Album
"Tears of Sorrow" "Pretty Baby"	1960	—	—	—	—	—	—	—	—	—	—			Non-album single
"I Want a Guy" "Never Again"	1961	—	—	—	—	—	—	—	—	—	—			Meet The Supremes
"Buttered Popcorn" (Note: The original master of this single was withdrawn shortly after its release, and a re-recorded version, also featuring Ballard on lead, was issued instead.) "Who's Lovin' You"	1961	—	—	—	—	—	—	—	—	—	—			Meet The Supremes
"Your Heart Belongs to Me" "(He's) Seventeen"	1962	95	—	—	—	—	—	—	—	—	—			Meet The Supremes
"Let Me Go the Right Way" "Time Changes Things"	1962	90	—	—	—	—	—	—	—	—	—			Meet The Supremes
"My Heart Can't Take It No More" "You Bring Back Memories"	1963	— (Note: "My Heart Can't Take It No More" did not enter the Billboard Hot 100, but peaked at number 29 on the Bubbling Under Hot 100 Singles chart.)	—	—	—	—	—	—	—	—	—			The Supremes Sing Country, Western and Pop; Meet The Supremes
"A Breathtaking Guy" (Note: Originally issued as "A Breath Taking, First Sight Soul Shaking, One Night Love Making, Next Day Heart Breaking Guy", quickly withdrawn and re-pressed with the shortened title.) "(The Man with the) Rock and Roll Banjo Band"	1963	75	—	—	—	—	—	—	—	—	—			Where Did Our Love Go; The Supremes Sing Country, Western and Pop
"When the Lovelight Starts Shining Through His Eyes" (Note: Backing vocals by Supremes Florence Ballard and Mary Wilson; plus the Four Tops and Holland-Dozier-Holland.) "Standing at the Crossroads of Love"	1963	23	24	—	—	—	—	—	—	—	—			Where Did Our Love Go
"Run, Run, Run" (Note: Backing vocals by Supremes Florence Ballard and Mary Wilson; plus the Four Tops.) "I'm Giving You Your Freedom"	1964	93	—	—	—	—	—	—	—	—	—			Where Did Our Love Go
"Where Did Our Love Go" "He Means the World to Me"	1964	1	14	21	1	16	—	4	1	4	3	US: 2,000,000 (Note: United States sales figure for "Where Did Our Love Go", as of 1965.)	BPI: Gold; RMNZ: Gold	Where Did Our Love Go
"Baby Love" "Ask Any Girl"	1964	1	26	18	10	15	—	7	1	1	1	US: 1,000,000 (Note: United States sales figure for "Baby Love", as of 1965.)	RIAA: Gold; BPI: Platinum; RMNZ: Gold	Where Did Our Love Go
"Come See About Me" "(You're Gone But) Always in My Heart"	1964	1	78	—	1	—	—	17	2	1	27	US: 1,000,000 (Note: United States sales figure for "Come See About Me", as of 1965.); UK: 65,000 (Note: United Kingdom digital sales figure for "Come See About Me", as of 2019.)		Where Did Our Love Go; The Supremes Sing Holland-Dozier-Holland
"Stop! In the Name of Love" "I'm in Love Again"	1965	1	42	18	3	3	10	21	—	—	7	US: 1,000,000 (Note: United States sales figure for "Stop! In the Name of Love", as of 1984.)	RIAA: Gold; BPI: Silver	More Hits by The Supremes
"Back in My Arms Again" "Whisper You Love Me Boy"	1965	1	95	—	1	34	—	—	12	—	40	US: 1,000,000 (Note: United States sales figure for "Back in My Arms Again", as of 1984.)		More Hits by The Supremes
"Moonlight and Kisses" (Note: Not released in the US.) "Baby, Baby, Wo Ist Unsere Liebe"	1965	—	—	—	—	—	—	—	—	—	—			Non-album singles
"Thank You Darling" "Jonny und Joe"	1965	—	—	—	—	18	—	—	—	—	—			Non-album singles
"Nothing but Heartaches" "He Holds His Own"	1965	11	83	—	4	—	10	—	—	3	— (Note: "Nothing but Heartaches" did not enter the UK Singles Chart, but peaked at number 14 on Britain's Top R&B Singles (Record Mirror) chart.)	US: 1,000,000 (Note: United States sales figure for "Nothing but Heartaches", as of 1980.)		More Hits by The Supremes
"I Hear a Symphony" "Who Could Ever Doubt My Love"	1965	1	48	—	17	—	—	35	5	—	39	World: 2,000,000 (Note: Worldwide sales figure for "I Hear a Symphony", as of 1984.); US: 1,000,000 (Note: United States sales figure for "I Hear a Symphony", as of 1980.)		I Hear a Symphony; More Hits by The Supremes
"Children's Christmas Song" (Note: Backing vocals by The Andantes.) "Twinkle, Twinkle, Little Me"	1965	— (Note: "Children's Christmas Song" did not enter the Billboard Hot 100, but peaked at number 12 on the Billboard Christmas Singles chart, whilst "Twinkle, Twinkle, Little Me" peaked at number 11.)	—	—	—	—	—	—	—	—	—			Merry Christmas
"Santa Claus Is Coming to Town" "Joy to the World"	1965	—	—	—	—	—	—	—	—	1	167			Merry Christmas
"My Favorite Things" "Rudolph the Red-Nosed Reindeer"	1965	—	—	—	—	—	—	—	—	10	—			Merry Christmas
"My World Is Empty Without You" "Everything is Good About You"	1965	5	88	—	29	—	—	—	—	7	—	US: 1,000,000 (Note: United States sales figure for "My World Is Empty Without You", as of 1984.)		I Hear a Symphony
"Love Is Like an Itching in My Heart" "He's All I Got"	1966	9	100	—	3	—	—	—	—	—	— (Note: "Love Is Like an Itching in My Heart" did not enter the UK Singles Chart, but peaked at number 11 on Britain's Top R&B Singles (Record Mirror) chart.)	US: 368,000		The Supremes A' Go-Go; I Hear a Symphony
"You Can't Hurry Love" "Put Yourself in My Place"	1966	1	10	—	3	—	—	24	—	3	3	US: 1,000,000 (Note: United States sales figure for "You Can't Hurry Love", as of 1984.)	BPI: Platinum; FIMI: Gold; IFPI-DEN: Gold; PROMUSICAE: Gold; RMNZ: Platinum	The Supremes A' Go-Go
"You Keep Me Hangin' On" "Remove This Doubt"	1966	1	29	12	3	—	9	26	18	2	8	US: 1,000,000 (Note: United States sales figure for "You Keep Me Hangin' On", as of 1984.)	BPI: Silver	The Supremes Sing Holland–Dozier–Holland
"Love Is Here and Now You're Gone" "There's No Stopping Us Now"	1967	1	45	48	1	—	—	35	—	—	17	US: 1,000,000 (Note: United States sales figure for "Love Is Here and Now You're Gone", as of 1984.)		The Supremes Sing Holland–Dozier–Holland
"The Happening" "All I Know About You"	1967	1	5	46	2	—	—	5	14	—	6	US: 1,000,000 (Note: United States sales figure for "The Happening", as of 1984.)		Greatest Hits; Non-album b-side
"Reflections" "Going Down for the Third Time"	1967	2	34	43	3	—	10	3	—	—	5	US: 1,000,000 (Note: United States sales figure for "Reflections", as of 1984.)		Reflections; B-sides from The Supremes Sing Holland-Dozier-Holland
"In and Out of Love" (Note: Backing vocals by Supremes Florence Ballard and Mary Wilson; plus The Andantes.) "I Guess I'll Always Love You"	1967	9	30	—	10	—	—	— (Note: "In and Out of Love" did not enter the Dutch Top 40, but peaked at number 5 on the Tipparade, 'bubbling under' Top 40 chart.)	—	—	13			Reflections; B-sides from The Supremes Sing Holland-Dozier-Holland
"Forever Came Today" "Time Changes Things"	1968	28	68	—	20	—	—	40	—	—	28			Reflections; Meet The Supremes
"Some Things You Never Get Used To" "You've Been So Wonderful to Me"	1968	30	98	—	25	—	—	—	—	—	34	US: 202,963		Love Child
"Love Child" "Will This Be the Day"	1968	1	2	—	1	—	—	18	1	—	15	US: 2,000,000 (Note: United States sales figure for "Love Child", as of December 28, 1968.)		Love Child; Let the Sunshine In
"I'm Gonna Make You Love Me" "A Place in the Sun" (with The Temptations)	1968	2	14	47	2	—	6	27	16	—	3	US: 1,000,000 (Note: United States sales figure for "I'm Gonna Make You Love Me", as of 1984.)	RIAA: Platinum	Diana Ross & the Supremes Join The Temptations
"I'm Livin' in Shame" "I'm So Glad (I Got Somebody Like You Around)"	1969	10	33	—	12	—	27	— (Note: "I'm Livin' in Shame" did not enter the Dutch Top 40, but peaked at number 3 on the Tipparade, 'bubbling under' Top 40 chart.)	—	—	14			Let the Sunshine In
"I'll Try Something New" "The Way You Do the Things You Do" (with The Temptations)	1969	25	—	—	16	—	—	—	—	—	—			Diana Ross & the Supremes Join The Temptations
"The Composer" "The Beginning of the End"	1969	27	87	—	14	—	—	— (Note: "The Composer" did not enter the Dutch Top 40, but peaked at number 20 on the Tipparade, 'bubbling under' Top 40 chart.)	—	—	—	US: 200,000		Let the Sunshine In; B-sides from Cream of the Crop
"No Matter What Sign You Are" "The Young Folks"	1969	31; 69	—	—	28; 91	—	—	— (Note: "No Matter What Sign You Are" did not enter the Dutch Top 40, but peaked at number 2 on the Tipparade, 'bubbling under' Top 40 chart.)	—	—	37			Let the Sunshine In; B-sides from Cream of the Crop
"The Weight" "For Better or Worse" (with The Temptations)	1969	46	—	—	36	—	—	—	—	—	—			Together
"I Second That Emotion" "The Way You Do the Things You Do" (with The Temptations)	1969	—	—	—	—	—	20	—	—	—	18			Diana Ross & the Supremes Join The Temptations; TCB
"Someday We'll Be Together" (Note: Backing vocals by Johnny Bristol, Maxine Waters and Julia Waters; instead of Supremes Mary Wilson and Cindy Birdsong.) "He's My Sunny Boy"	1969	1	52	—	4	—	3	19	—	—	13	World: 3,000,000 (Note: Worldwide sales figure for "Someday We'll Be Together", as of 1984.); US: 2,000,000 (Note: United States sales figure for "Someday We'll Be Together", as of 2008.)	RIAA: Platinum; RMNZ: Gold	Cream of the Crop; Love Child
"—" denotes the single failed to chart or was not released

=== 1970s-1980 ===
List of singles, with selected chart positions and sales, showing year released and album nameAll records released on Motown Records.
A-side title B-side title	Year	Peak chart positions										Sales	Album
A-side title B-side title	Year	US	US R&B /HH	AUS	BEL (WA)	BGK	CAN	IRE	ISL	NLD	UK	Sales	Album
"The Rhythm of Life" "Ain't No Mountain High Enough" (with The Temptations)	1970	—	—	5	—	—	—	—	—	—	—		G.I.T. on Broadway; Diana Ross & The Supremes Join The Temptations
"Why (Must We Fall in Love)" "Uptight (Everything's Alright)" (with The Temptations)	1970	—	—	—	—	—	—	—	—	—	31		Together
"Up the Ladder to the Roof" "Bill, When Are You Coming Back"	1970	10	5	43	—	—	8	—	10	— (Note: "Up the Ladder to the Roof" did not enter the Dutch Top 40, but peaked at number 2 on the Tipparade, 'bubbling under' Top 40 chart.)	6	US: 1,000,000 (Note: United States sales figure for "Up the Ladder to the Roof", as of 1986.)	Right On
"Everybody's Got the Right to Love" "But I Love You More"	1970	21	11	—	—	—	14	—	—	— (Note: "Everybody's Got the Right to Love" did not enter the Dutch Top 40, but peaked at number 18 on the Tipparade, 'bubbling under' Top 40 chart.)	—		Right On
"Stoned Love" "Shine on Me"	1970	7	1	99	37	—	9	19	6	—	3	US: 1,000,000 (Note: United States sales figure for "Stoned Love", as of 1986.); UK: 59,000 (Note: United Kingdom digital sales figure for "Stoned Love", as of 2019.)	New Ways but Love Stays
"River Deep, Mountain High" "Together We Can Make Such Sweet Music" (with the Four Tops)	1970	14	7	—	35	—	20	12	—	25	11		The Magnificent 7
"Reach Out and Touch (Somebody's Hand)" "Where Would I Be Without You Baby" (with the Four Tops)	1970	—	—	56	—	—	—	—	—	—	—		The Magnificent 7
"A Taste of Honey" (Note: "A Taste of Honey" was only released in the Netherlands, Lebanon and Turkey.) "Knock on My Door" (with the Four Tops)	1971	—	—	—	—	—	—	—	—	— (Note: "A Taste of Honey" did not enter the Dutch Top 40, but peaked at number 7 on the Tipparade, 'bubbling under' Top 40 chart.)	—		The Magnificent 7
"Nathan Jones" "Happy (Is a Bumpy Road)"	1971	16	8	—	42	—	15	—	—	27	5	US: 1,000,000 (Note: United States sales figure for "Nathan Jones", as of 1986.)	Touch
"You Gotta Have Love in Your Heart" "I'm Glad About It" (with the Four Tops)	1971	55	41	—	—	—	—	—	—	—	25		The Return of the Magnificent Seven
"Touch" "It's So Hard for Me to Say Good-bye"	1971	71	—	—	—	—	71	—	—	—	—		Touch
"Floy Joy" "This Is the Story"	1971	16	5	—	—	—	31	—	—	—	9	US: 1,000,000 (Note: United States sales figure for "Floy Joy", as of 1984.)	Floy Joy; Touch
"Automatically Sunshine" "Precious Little Things"	1972	37	21	—	—	3	49	—	10	—	10		Floy Joy
"Without the One You Love" "Let's Make Love Now" (with the Four Tops)	1972	—	—	—	—	17	—	—	—	—	—		The Magnificent 7
"Your Wonderful, Sweet Sweet Love" "The Wisdom of Time"	1972	59	22	—	—	—	81	—	—	—	—		Floy Joy
"I Guess I'll Miss the Man" "Over and Over"	1972	85	—	—	—	—	—	—	—	—	—		The Supremes Produced and Arranged by Jimmy Webb; Floy Joy
"Bad Weather" "Oh Be My Love"	1973	87	74	—	—	—	—	—	—	—	37		Non-album single Floy Joy
"Tossin' and Turnin'" "Oh Be My Love"	1973	—	—	—	—	—	—	—	—	—	—		The Supremes Produced and Arranged by Jimmy Webb; Floy Joy
"He's My Man" "Give Out, But Don't Give Up"	1975	—	69	—	—	—	—	—	—	—	—		The Supremes
"Where Do I Go from Here" "Give Out, But Don't Give Up"	1975	—	93	—	—	—	—	—	—	—	—		The Supremes
"Early Morning Love" "Where Is It I Belong"	1975	—	—	—	—	—	—	—	—	—	—		The Supremes
"I'm Gonna Let My Heart Do the Walking" "Early Morning Love"	1976	40	25	—	—	—	53	—	—	—	—		High Energy; The Supremes
"High Energy" "High Energy"	1976	—	—	—	—	—	—	—	—	—	—		High Energy
"You're My Driving Wheel" "You're What's Missing in My Life"	1976	85	50	—	—	—	—	—	—	—	—		Mary, Scherrie & Susaye; High Energy
"Let Yourself Go" "You Are the Heart of Me"	1977	— (Note: "Let Yourself Go" and "Love, I Never Knew You Could Feel So Good", did not enter the Billboard Hot 100, but peaked at number five on the US Hot Dance Club Songs chart.)	83	—	—	—	—	—	—	—	—		Mary, Scherrie & Susaye
"Love, I Never Knew You Could Feel So Good" "This Is Why I Believe in You"	1977	—	—	—	—	—	—	—	—	—	—		Mary, Scherrie & Susaye; The Supremes
"Medley of Hits" (Note: A medley of the Holland-Dozier-Holland hits: "Stop! In the Name of Love", "Back In My Arms Again", "Come See About Me", "Love Is Like An Itching In My Heart", "Where Did Our Love Go" and "Baby Love".)	1980	— (Note: "Medley of Hits" did not enter the Billboard Hot 100, but peaked at number 46 on the US Hot Dance Club Songs chart.)	—	—	—	—	—	—	—	—	— (Note: "Medley of Hits" did not enter the Official Charts Company UK Singles Chart, but peaked at number 57 on the UK Record Business Singles Chart and number 16 on the UK Disco (Record Mirror) chart.)		Non-album single
"—" denotes the single failed to chart or was not released

=== 1990s ===
List of singles, with selected chart positions, showing year released and album nameAll records released on Motown Records.
Title	Year	Peak chart positions	Album
Title	Year	US Dance	Album
"Someday We'll Be Together" (Frankie Knuckles remix)	1994	7	Diana Extended: The Remixes

=== 2000s ===
List of singles, showing year released and album nameAll records released on Motown Records.
A-side title B-side title (Artist)	Year	Album
"Stoned Love" (A Tom Moulton Mix)	2005	Motown Remixed
"Honey Bee (Keep On Stinging Me)" (Out on the Floor Mix) "All Day All Night" (Earl Van Dyke)	2005	A Cellarful of Motown! Volume 2

=== 2020s ===
List of singles, showing year released and album name
Title	Year	Album
"Get Ready/Stop! In the Name of Love/My Guy/Baby Love/(I Know) I'm Losing You" (Medley: Live on The Ed Sullivan Show, November 19, 1967)	2020	Non-album singles
"Come See About Me" (Live on The Ed Sullivan Show, December 27, 1964)	2020	Non-album singles
"Come See About Me/Stop! In the Name of Love/You Can't Hurry Love" (Medley: Live on The Ed Sullivan Show, December 4, 1966)	2020	Non-album singles
"Up the Ladder to the Roof" (Live on The Ed Sullivan Show, February 15, 1970)	2020	Non-album singles
"My Favorite Things" (Live on The Ed Sullivan Show, December 4, 1966)	2020	Non-album singles
"I Get a Kick Out of You" (Live on The Ed Sullivan Show, January 5, 1969)	2020	Non-album singles
"Love Child" (Live on The Ed Sullivan Show, September 29, 1968)	2020	Non-album singles
"I'm the Greatest Star/Funny Girl/Don't Rain On My Parade" (Medley: Live on The Ed Sullivan Show, September 29, 1968)	2020	Non-album singles
"Thou Swell" (Live on The Ed Sullivan Show, November 19, 1967)	2020	Non-album singles
"My World Is Empty Without You" (Live on The Ed Sullivan Show, February 20, 1966)	2020	Non-album singles
"You're Nobody till Somebody Loves You" (Live on The Ed Sullivan Show, October 10, 1965)	2020	Non-album singles
"Forever Came Today" (Live on The Ed Sullivan Show, March 24, 1968)	2020	Non-album singles
"I'm Livin' in Shame" (Live on The Ed Sullivan Show, January 5, 1969)	2020	Non-album singles
"Baby Love/Stop! In the Name of Love/Come See About Me" (Medley: Live on The Ed Sullivan Show, March 24, 1968)	2021	Non-album singles
"Someday We'll Be Together" (Live on The Ed Sullivan Show, December 21, 1969)	2021	Non-album singles
"If My Friends Could See Me Now/Nothing Can Stop Us Now/Once In A Lifetime" (Medley: Live on The Ed Sullivan Show, February 15, 1970)	2021	Non-album singles
"The Happening" (Live on The Ed Sullivan Show, May 7, 1967)	2021	Non-album singles
"Thoroughly Modern Millie/Second Hand Rose/Mame" (Medley: Live on The Ed Sullivan Show, May 7, 1967)	2021	Non-album singles
"I Hear a Symphony/Stranger in Paradise/Wonderful! Wonderful!" (Medley: Live on The Ed Sullivan Show, September 25, 1966)	2021	Non-album singles
"Love Is Like an Itching in My Heart" (Live on The Ed Sullivan Show, May 1, 1966)	2021	Non-album singles
"More" (Live on The Ed Sullivan Show, May 1, 1966)	2021	Non-album singles
"Somewhere" (Live on The Ed Sullivan Show, February 20, 1966)	2021	Non-album singles
"That Piano Playing Man/Honeysuckle Rose/Ain't Misbehavin'" (Medley: Live on The Ed Sullivan Show, March 24, 1968)	2021	Non-album singles
"Say It with Music/It's A Lovely Day Today/Heat Wave" (Medley: Live on The Ed Sullivan Show, May 5, 1968)	2021	Non-album singles
"Always" (Live on The Ed Sullivan Show, May 5, 1968)	2021	Non-album singles
"You're Nobody till Somebody Loves You" (Live on The Ed Sullivan Show, May 11, 1969)	2021	Non-album singles
"No Matter What Sign You Are" (Live on The Ed Sullivan Show, May 11, 1969)	2021	Non-album singles
"The Impossible Dream" (Live on The Ed Sullivan Show, May 11, 1969)	2021	Non-album singles

=== As backing vocalists ===
List of singles by other artists, The Primettes and The Supremes recorded backing vocals for, with selected chart positions, showing year released and album nameTitles only included if they are confirmed to have background vocals by The Primettes or The Supremes
A-side title B-side title (Artist)	Year	Peak chart positions			Album
A-side title B-side title (Artist)	Year	US	US Cash.	US R&B /HH	Album
"The Return of Stagger Lee" (Don Revel)	1960	—	—	—	Non-album singles
"I'll Get Along" "All I Need Is You" (Al Garner) (Note: In some releases, such as Remembering Roots of Soul, Vol. 2: Birth of Motor Town, both sides are credited to Marv Johnson and the Primettes.)	1961	—	—	—	Non-album singles
"Love Me" (Pete Hartfield)	1961	—	—	—	Non-album singles
"Small Sad Sam" "Tie Me Tight" (Bob Kayli)	1961	—	—	—	Non-album singles
"Whose Heart (Are You Gonna Break Now)" "I'll Call You" (Don McKenzie)	1961	—	—	—	Non-album singles
"Bouquet of Flowers" "When I Needed You" (James Velvet)	1962	—	—	—	Non-album singles
"Let Me Be Your Boy" (Wilson Pickett)	1962	—	—	—	Non-album singles
"Lonely Nights" (Gene Martin)	1962	—	—	—	Non-album singles
"It Should Have Been Me" (b-side) (Kim Weston)	1963	—	—	—	Non-album singles
"You Lost the Sweetest Boy" (Mary Wells)	1963	22	22	10	Greatest Hits
"Can I Get a Witness" (Marvin Gaye)	1963	22	18	3 (Note: From November 30, 1963 to January 23, 1965, the Billboard R&B singles chart was temporarily discontinued. Billboard determined it unnecessary due to so much crossover of titles between the R&B and pop charts in light of the rise of Motown. The chart was reinstated as Hot Rhythm & Blues Singles on January 30, 1965. For the period in which no chart was published, Billboard now uses Cashbox magazine's Top 50 In R&B Locations singles chart for data.)	Greatest Hits
"You're a Wonderful One" (Marvin Gaye)	1964	15	18	3	Greatest Hits
"The Touch of Time" (b-side) (Barbara McNair)	1965	—	—	—	Non-album single
"—" denotes the single failed to chart or was not released

=== Promotional singles ===
List of promotional singles, showing year released and album nameAll records released on Motown Records.
A-side title B-side title	Year	Album
"The Only Time I'm Happy" Supremes interview (non-album)	1965	More Hits by The Supremes
"Dr. Goldfoot and the Bikini Machine"	1965	Non-album singles
"Things Are Changing" (Note: Produced by Phil Spector, for The Equal Employment Opportunity Commission to inform minority groups that new employment opportunities were opening up for them. First recorded by Darlene Love and The Blossoms; subsequently the same backing track was used to record versions by The Supremes and Jay and the Americans.)	1965	Non-album singles

=== Re-issued singles ===
List of re-issued singles, with selected chart positions, showing year released and album nameAll records released on Motown Records.
A-side title B-side title	Year	Peak chart positions		Album
A-side title B-side title	Year	IRE	UK	Album
"Baby Love" "Ask Any Girl"	1974	16	12	Where Did Our Love Go
"Where Did Our Love Go" "Nothing but Heartaches" (from More Hits by The Supremes)	1974	—	— (Note: "Where Did Our Love Go" did not re-enter the Official Charts Company UK Singles Chart, but peaked at number 56 on the "Breakers List", which was an officially published BRMB list of the most popular records in the UK outside of the top 50.)	Where Did Our Love Go
"You Keep Me Hangin' On" "Come See About Me" (from Where Did Our Love Go)	1986	—	91	The Supremes Sing Holland–Dozier–Holland
"Stop! In the Name of Love" "Automatically Sunshine" (from Floy Joy)	1989	—	62	More Hits by The Supremes
"—" denotes the single failed to chart or was not released

== Other appearances ==
=== Album appearances ===
List of non-single album appearances as main artist, which were previously unreleased, showing year released and album name
Title	Year	Album
"Stop! in the Name of Love"	1965	Motortown Revue in Paris
"Baby Love"	1965	Motortown Revue in Paris
"Somewhere"	1965	Motortown Revue in Paris
"O Little Town of Bethlehem"	2001	A Motown Christmas, Volume 2
"Oh Holy Night" (Note: Lead vocals by Florence Ballard.)	2001	A Motown Christmas, Volume 2
"You've Got To Pay The Price"	2005	A Cellarful of Motown! Volume 2
"You Didn't Care" [Alternate Version]	2013	Motown Unreleased 1963
"Lazybones" [Alternate Version]	2013	Motown Unreleased 1963
"Funny (How Time Slips Away)" [Alternate Version]	2013	Motown Unreleased 1963
"You're Gonna Come To Me" [Alternate Version]"	2013	Motown Unreleased 1963
"More"	2016	Motown Unreleased 1966
"Somewhere"	2016	Motown Unreleased 1966
"Michelle"	2016	Motown Unreleased 1966
"Were You There"	2016	Motown Unreleased 1966
"What Do You Choose"	2016	Motown Unreleased 1966
"Come See About Me"	2016	Motortown Revue in Paris (Super Deluxe Edition)
"People"	2016	Motortown Revue in Paris (Super Deluxe Edition)
"You're Nobody 'Til Somebody Loves You"	2016	Motortown Revue in Paris (Super Deluxe Edition)
"Shake"	2016	Motortown Revue in Paris (Super Deluxe Edition)
"For Once in My Life"	2019	Motown Unreleased 1969

=== As featured artist ===
List of non-single album appearances as featured artist, showing year released and album name
Title (Artist)	Year	Album
"Walk Away" (Udo Jürgens featuring The Supremes)	1977	Udo Live 77

== Other albums ==
List of other albums, including shelved and cancelled albums, showing proposed release year and album name
Title	Year	Notes
The Supremes Sing Ballads & Blues	1963	The Supremes Sing Ballads & Blues was assigned a catalog number (Motown 610) in late 1963 and given a projected release date. Although it was not released, several of the tracks originally recorded for it appeared on the album The Supremes Sing Country, Western and Pop in spring 1965.
Live, Live, Live!	1965	Live, Live, Live!, a combination of live concert recordings, was scheduled for release on Motown 625 in early 1965. Although no official track list is available, the live set from the expanded fortieth anniversary edition of the Where Did Our Love Go album features tracks that were slated for inclusion on the album. The Where Did Our Love Go anniversary edition liner notes indicate the possibility of tracks from the Motortown Revue in Paris were also considered.
There's a Place for Us	1965	There's a Place for Us, an album of pop standards, was originally scheduled to be released in the summer of 1965 to tie into the Supremes' groundbreaking debut appearance at the Copacabana nightclub in New York. It was ultimately shelved in favor for a live album of their Copacabana engagement which included many songs originally on the album. The album eventually saw a release as an expanded volume in 2004, 39 years after it was completed.
A Tribute to the Girls	1965	A Tribute to the Girls was an album Motown planned for the group to record in 1965 featuring songs made famous by girl groups of the time; however it was never completed. Several tracks were featured on the expanded release of There's a Place for Us.
Around the World with The Supremes	1965	Around the World with The Supremes was an album Motown intended to showcase the group singing famous international songs such as "Sukiyaki", "Tie Me Kangaroo Down Sport" and "Nel blu dipinto di blu". 11 instrumental tracks were recorded, but the album was never completed as vocals were never added.
Pure Gold	1966	Pure Gold, an album of greatest hits-like material, was planned for release in May 1966, but was cancelled.
Live at the Roostertail	1966	Live at the Roostertail, a live concert recorded on September 26, 1966, has a significantly different set list to the earlier The Supremes at the Copa (1965), but was shelved. Motown considered a mix of the album featuring songs from the Roostertail show with songs recorded at the 1965 Copacabana engagement but not included on the live album. The set features a medley of songs from their I Hear a Symphony (1966) album, which was similarly performed on The Ed Sullivan Show in addition to "More (Theme from Mondo Cane)". The set is also notable for containing the last recorded performances of "Make Someone Happy" and "People". Two tracks from the album, "You Can't Hurry Love", and "Group Introductions", were released in 2000 on a bonus disc included with certain copies of The Supremes box set. The complete show was released in 2012 on the expanded edition of the I Hear A Symphony album.
The Supremes and the Motown Sound: From Broadway to Hollywood	1967	The Supremes and the Motown Sound: From Broadway to Hollywood was intended for release in early 1967, but no formal track listings for the album were produced despite an album worth of tracks were recorded. It is widely believed that the album would have been based around the group's then-current number one single, "The Happening". Tracks for the album were recorded in Los Angeles and featured songs made popular on Broadway or in Hollywood films. Earlier vaulted material, notably from the featured recordings from the There's a Place for Us sessions, were also considered for inclusion.
Live at the Copa	1967	Live at the Copa, a live recording of concerts between May 19–20, 1967 is notable as one of the last to feature Florence Ballard. The set features a rare live recording of "My Favorite Things", in addition to the number-one hit "The Happening" and a medley of "Thoroughly Modern Millie", "Second Hand Rose" and "Mame" which were previously only available on Live at London's Talk of the Town (1968), featuring Cindy Birdsong in Ballard's place. Three tracks from the album, "Somewhere", "Group Introduction" and "You're Nobody 'til Somebody Loves You", were released on the second disc of The Supremes (2000) box set. The complete set, composed of the best takes from both shows, was released on the 2018 expanded edition of The Supremes Sing Holland-Dozier-Holland.
Live at the Roostertail	1967	Live at the Roostertail, a live concert recorded on August 27, 1967, remains largely unreleased due to problems with the master tape. It was the first live recording to feature Cindy Birdsong. Two tracks from the album, "You Keep Me Hangin' On", and "Reflections", were released with certain limited copies of The Supremes (2000) box set, on a bonus disc titled In Person – An Evening with The Supremes.
Diana Ross & the Supremes Sing Disney Classics	1968	Diana Ross & the Supremes Sing Disney Classics was an album featuring covers of songs from films produced by Walt Disney Productions. Recordings for the album began in 1967 with Florence Ballard and continued with her replacement, Cindy Birdsong. Songs recorded for the album, have appeared on the 1986 compilation series 25th Anniversary as well as The Never-Before-Released Masters (1987). "Chim Chim Cher-ee", "A Spoonful of Sugar", and "Zip-a-Dee-Doo-Dah" still remain unreleased.
Some Things You Never Get Used To	1968	Some Things You Never Get Used To was a 1968 album named after the single. The album was shelved when the single failed to make the impact expected. The proposed track list was: Side One: "Some Things You Never Get Used To", "Heaven Must Have Sent You", "He's My Sunny Boy", "Come On and See Me", "Can I Get a Witness" and "You've Been So Wonderful to Me". Side Two: "My Guy", "It's Not Unusual", "Just a Little Misunderstanding", "Uptight (Everything's Alright)", "What Becomes of the Brokenhearted" and "Blowin' in the Wind". Several of the songs on side one, including the single, appeared on Love Child (1968), "What Becomes of the Brokenhearted" on Let the Sunshine In (1969) and "Blowin' in the Wind" on Cream of the Crop (1969). The remaining unreleased tracks were later included on the compilation albums 25th Anniversary, Vol. 2 (1986) and Let the Music Play: Supreme Rarities (2008).
Promises Kept	1971	Promises Kept, a 1971 set by the "New Supremes" produced by Clay McMurray, Bobby Taylor, Ashford & Simpson, and others. Despite a wealth of recordings, an official track list was never finalized and the Supremes were instead assigned to work on Floy Joy with Smokey Robinson as producer. Some of the Promises Kept songs appear on the 2000 Supremes box set and the 2002 70s Anthology. Thirteen other tracks from the sessions are also included in The Supremes box set This Is the Story: The '70s Albums, Vol. 1 – 1970–1973: The Jean Terrell Years.
Untitled Stevie Wonder Album	1973	Stevie Wonder wrote and produced "Bad Weather", described as 'their most innovative single to date', with hopes the song would return the group back to the top of the charts. However, despite positive critical reception, the song only peaked at number 87 on the Billboard Hot 100, though it peaked within the top 40 of the UK Singles Chart. Disappointed, Wonder complained to Motown President Ewart Abner, who promised the company would "get on it" but subsequently Wonder's plans to record an album with The Supremes were scrapped. Including "Bad Weather", Stevie Wonder wrote and produced three songs for The Supremes. Lynda Laurence would later recall the group recorded six songs.

== Videography ==
=== Video albums ===
Title	Year	Peak chart positions		Certification
Title	Year	US Music Videos	UK Music Videos	Certification
T.A.M.I. Show	1964	—	—	
Motown 25: Yesterday, Today, Forever	1983	2	—	RIAA: Platinum
Reflections: The Definitive Performances (1964–1969)	2006	18	30	RIAA: Platinum
Greatest Hits: Live in Amsterdam	2006	—	—	
The Best of The Supremes on The Ed Sullivan Show	2011	11	—	

== See also ==
- Diana Ross discography

== Notes ==
Charts and sales

Further information
