= Diana Ross & the Supremes: 20 Golden Greats =

20 Golden Greats

Greatest hits album by Diana Ross & the Supremes
- Released: September 1977
- Recorded: 1964–1969
- Genres: Pop, R&B, baroque pop, psychedelic pop
- Label: Motown
- Producers: Brian Holland; Lamont Dozier; Nickolas Ashford & Valerie Simpson; Berry Gordy; Henry Cosby; Frank Wilson; Deke Richards; R. Dean Taylor; Johnny Bristol

Diana Ross & the Supremes chronology
Mary, Scherrie & Susaye (1976)	20 Golden Greats (1977)	At Their Best (1978)

Professional ratings
Review scores
Source	Rating
Music Week	4/4 stars

20 Golden Greats is a 1977 compilation album by Diana Ross & the Supremes, released on the Motown label in the United Kingdom. The release spent seven weeks at number one on the UK Albums Chart, selling over 1,000,000 copies. Despite the album's title and that Ross & the Supremes had scored 21 UK chart hit singles, the compilation included two tracks that had never been hit singles in the UK: "My World Is Empty Without You" and "Love Is Like an Itching in My Heart", which were top 10 hits on the US Hot 100. All the other 18 tracks had made the UK singles chart. The three other hits scored by the group in partnership with The Temptations, were all excluded.

Motown expanded the track list to include hits from The Supremes after Ross left the trio in 1970, also including her solo work up to 1981, for the 1998 40 Golden Motown Greats CD. The same album artwork was used and this collection earned a gold disc for sales exceeding 100,000 copies.

== Track listing ==
=== Side one ===
1. "Where Did Our Love Go" from Where Did Our Love Go
2. "Baby Love" from Where Did Our Love Go
3. "Come See About Me" from Where Did Our Love Go
4. "Stop! In the Name of Love" from More Hits by The Supremes
5. "Back in My Arms Again" from More Hits by The Supremes
6. "I Hear a Symphony" from I Hear a Symphony
7. "My World Is Empty Without You" from I Hear a Symphony
8. "Love Is Like an Itching in My Heart" from The Supremes A' Go-Go
9. "You Can't Hurry Love" from The Supremes A' Go-Go
10. "You Keep Me Hangin' On" from The Supremes Sing Holland-Dozier-Holland

=== Side two ===
1. "Love Is Here and Now You're Gone" from The Supremes Sing Holland-Dozier-Holland
2. "The Happening" from Greatest Hits
3. "Reflections" from Reflections
4. "In and Out of Love" from Reflections
5. "Forever Came Today" from Reflections
6. "Some Things You Never Get Used To" from Love Child
7. "Love Child" from Love Child
8. "I'm Livin' in Shame" from Let the Sunshine In
9. "No Matter What Sign You Are" from Let the Sunshine In
10. "Someday We'll Be Together" from Cream of the Crop

== Personnel ==
- Diana Ross: lead vocals
- Mary Wilson: background vocals from "Where Did Our Love Go" through "In and Out of Love"
- Florence Ballard: background vocals from "Where Did Our Love Go" through "In and Out of Love"
- The Andantes (Jackie Hicks, Marlene Barrow and Louvain Demps): background vocals on "In and Out of Love" (shared with The Supremes), "Forever Came Today", "Love Child" and "I'm Livin' in Shame"
- Maxine Waters and Julia Waters: background vocals on "Someday We'll Be Together"
- Johnny Bristol: male vocal and background vocals on "Someday We'll Be Together"
- Nickolas Ashford and Valerie Simpson: background vocals on "Some Things You Never Get Used To"
- The Blackberries (Venetta Fields, Clydie King and Sherlie Matthews): background vocals on "No Matter What Sign You Are"

== Chart history ==
=== Weekly charts ===
Chart (1977–1978)	Peak positions
Australia (Kent Music Report)	21
New Zealand Albums (RMNZ)	6
UK Albums (Official Charts)	1

=== Year-end charts ===
Chart (1977)	Position
UK Albums (Music Week)	3
Chart (1978)	Rank
New Zealand Albums (RMNZ)	33
UK Albums (Morgunblaðið)	12
Chart (1979)	Rank
UK Albums (Morgunblaðið)	18

== Certifications ==
Region	Certification	Certified units/sales
New Zealand (RMNZ)	Platinum	15,000^{^}
United Kingdom (BPI)	2× Platinum	1,000,000
^{^} Shipments figures based on certification alone.
