= 20th Century Masters – The Millennium Collection: The Best of Diana Ross & the Supremes =

Greatest hits album by the Supremes
- Released: August 31, 1999
- Length: 34:09
- Label: Motown
- Producer: Harry Weinger

The Supremes chronology
The Ultimate Collection (1997)	20th Century Masters – The Millennium Collection: The Best of Diana Ross & the Supremes (1999)	The '70s Anthology (2002)

20th Century Masters – The Millennium Collection: The Best of Diana Ross & the Supremes is a 1999 greatest hits album by the American girl group the Supremes, released on August 31, 1999 by Motown. Produced by Harry Weinger, The compilation contains most of the Supremes' hits ranging from 1964 to 1969, with every track topping the Billboard Hot 100 Singles chart except for "Reflections".

== Critical reception ==
Professional ratings
Review scores
Source	Rating
AllMusic	4/5 stars
The Rolling Stone Album Guide	4/5 stars
Tom Hull	A

In an AllMusic review, Andrew Hamilton summarizes that "These 11 songs represent the Supremes', and writers/producers Brian Holland, Lamont Dozier, and Eddie Holland's, best work."

== Track listing ==
All tracks are written by Holland–Dozier–Holland, except where noted.

No.	Title	Writer(s)	Original release	Length
1.	"Where Did Our Love Go"		Where Did Our Love Go (1964)	2:30
2.	"Baby Love"		Where Did Our Love Go	2:34
3.	"Come See About Me"		Where Did Our Love Go	2:38
4.	"Stop! In the Name of Love"		More Hits by The Supremes (1965)	2:52
5.	"Back in My Arms Again"		More Hits by The Supremes	2:51
6.	"I Hear a Symphony"		I Hear a Symphony (1966)	2:40
7.	"You Can't Hurry Love"		The Supremes A' Go-Go (1966)	2:45
8.	"You Keep Me Hangin' On"		The Supremes Sing Holland–Dozier–Holland (1967)	2:42
9.	"Reflections"		Reflections (1968)	2:50
10.	"Love Child"	R. Dean Taylor; Frank Wilson; Pam Sawyer; Deke Richards	Love Child (1968)	2:54
11.	"Someday We'll Be Together"	Johnny Bristol; Jackey Beavers; Harvey Fuqua	Cream of the Crop (1969)	3:29
Total length:				34:09

== Charts ==
Chart (2012)	Peak position
US Billboard 200	200

== Certifications ==
Certifications for 20th Century Masters – The Millennium Collection: The Best of Diana Ross & the Supremes
Region	Certification	Certified units/sales
United States	—	563,317^{^}
