= Greatest Hits Vol. 3 (The Supremes album) =

Diana Ross & the Supremes: Greatest Hits Vol. 3

Greatest hits album by Diana Ross & the Supremes
- Released: December 18, 1969
- Recorded: 1967–1969
- Genre: Soul, pop
- Length: 31:57
- Label: Motown
- Producer: Brian Holland; Lamont Dozier; Nickolas Ashford & Valerie Simpson; Berry Gordy; Henry Cosby; Frank Wilson; Deke Richards; R. Dean Taylor; Johnny Bristol

Diana Ross & the Supremes chronology
On Broadway (with The Temptations) (1969)	Diana Ross & the Supremes: Greatest Hits Vol. 3 (1969)	Farewell (1970)

Professional ratings
Review scores
Source	Rating
Allmusic	3/5 stars

Diana Ross & the Supremes: Greatest Hits Vol. 3 is a 1969 compilation album by Diana Ross & the Supremes, released on the Motown label. It features all of the hits released by the group between 1967 and 1969 save for the Supremes/Temptations duet singles. After Florence Ballard's mid-1967 departure from the group, Supremes singles were recorded by Diana Ross with session singers The Andantes on backgrounds instead of new Supreme Cindy Birdsong and founding member Mary Wilson, including "Love Child" and "Someday We'll Be Together".

Two of the singles included here, "Love Is Here and Now You're Gone" and "The Happening", were also included on Diana Ross & the Supremes: Greatest Hits. That album was a double disc release, and constituted both volumes one and two of the Supremes' greatest-hits series (hence the title of this release).

Diana Ross & the Supremes: Greatest Hits Vol. 3 was released on compact disc.

== Track listing ==
=== Side one ===
Superscripts denote original album sources, referenced below.

1. "Reflections" (Holland–Dozier–Holland) ^{c}
2. "Love Is Here and Now You're Gone" (Holland-Dozier-Holland) ^{a}
3. "Someday We'll Be Together" (Harvey Fuqua, Johnny Bristol, Jackey Beavers) ^{f}
4. "Love Child" (Frank Wilson, Pamela Sawyer, Deke Richards, Henry Cosby, R. Dean Taylor) ^{d}
5. "Some Things You Never Get Used To" (Nickolas Ashford, Valerie Simpson) ^{d}
6. "Forever Came Today" (Holland-Dozier-Holland) ^{c}

=== Side two ===
1. "In and Out of Love" (Holland-Dozier-Holland) ^{c}
2. "The Happening" (Holland-Dozier-Holland, Frank De Vol) ^{b}
3. "I'm Livin' in Shame" (Wilson, Sawyer, Richards, Cosby, Taylor) ^{e}
4. "No Matter What Sign You Are" (Berry Gordy, Cosby) ^{e}
5. "The Composer" (Smokey Robinson) ^{e}

=== Album sources ===
- ^{a} from The Supremes Sing Holland–Dozier–Holland (1967)
- ^{b} from Diana Ross & the Supremes: Greatest Hits (1967)
- ^{c} from Reflections (1968)
- ^{d} from Love Child (1968)
- ^{e} from Let the Sunshine In (1969)
- ^{f} from Cream of the Crop (1969)

== Personnel ==
- Diana Ross – lead vocals
- Mary Wilson, Florence Ballard, background vocals on "Reflections"
- Mary Wilson and Florence Ballard – background vocals on "Love Is Here and Now You're Gone", "In and Out of Love", and "The Happening"
- Maxine and Julia Waters – background vocals, "Someday We'll Be Together"
- The Andantes – background vocals on "Love Child", "Forever Came Today", "In and Out of Love", "I'm Livin' in Shame", "No Matter What Sign You Are", "The Composer"
- Johnny Bristol – producer and background vocals on "Someday We'll Be Together"
- Nickolas Ashford & Valerie Simpson – producers and backing vocals, "Some Things You Never Get Used To"
- Berry Gordy, Henry Cosby, Frank Wilson, Deke Richards, and R. Dean Taylor – producers, "Love Child" and "I'm Livin' in Shame"
- Berry Gordy & Henry Cosby – producers, "No Matter What Sign You Are"
- Smokey Robinson – producer, "The Composer"
- Brian Holland and Lamont Dozier – producers, "Reflections", "Love Is Here and Now You're Gone", "Forever Came Today", "In and Out of Love", "The Happening"
- The Funk Brothers – instrumentation on all tracks save for "Love Is Here and Now You're Gone" and "In and Out of Love".

== Charts ==
=== Weekly charts ===
Chart (1970)	Peak position
US Billboard 200	31
US Top R&B/Hip-Hop Albums (Billboard)	5

=== Year-end charts ===
Chart (1970)	Rank
US Top R&B/Hip-Hop Albums (Billboard)	25
