= Greatest Hits: Live in Amsterdam =

Video by Diana Ross and The Supremes
- Released: December 16, 2006
- Recorded: March 4, 1968, at Concertgebouw in Amsterdam, Netherlands
- Label: BR Music Holland

Diana Ross and The Supremes chronology
Reflections: The Definitive Performances (1964–1969) (2006)	Greatest Hits: Live in Amsterdam (2006)	Come See About Me (2007)

Greatest Hits: Live in Amsterdam is a DVD by The Supremes released in 2006.

== Background ==
In 1968 Diana Ross and The Supremes (Mary Wilson and Cindy Birdsong) made a lengthy European tour, playing to capacity audiences at prestigious nightclubs and theatres across the continent. Many of these shows were filmed by the local television stations and broadcast as prime-time viewing. The format of the show changed slightly for each country, but was basically the same as the live LP released later that year, Live at London's Talk of the Town. The concert is a fast-paced mix of the group's biggest hits to date, as well as a collection of showtunes and standards in medley form.

Cindy Birdsong replaced Florence Ballard in summer of 1967, as is featured on the main concert, while Ballard appears on the three bonus tracks

== Track listing ==
1. With a Song in My Heart
2. Stranger in Paradise
3. Wonderful! Wonderful!
4. Unchained Melody
5. Without a Song
6. Hits Medley: "Stop! In the Name of Love" / "Come See About Me" / "My World Is Empty Without You" / "Baby Love"
7. Queen of the House
8. More (Theme from Mondo Cane)
9. The Happening
10. Michelle / Yesterday
11. The Lady Is a Tramp / Let's Get Away from It All
12. In and Out of Love
13. Show Tune Medley: Thoroughly Modern Millie / Second Hand Rose / Mame
14. Reflections
15. Somewhere (from West Side Story)
16. You're Nobody till Somebody Loves You

=== Bonus tracks ===
Filmed October 14, 1964, at the Koninklijk Theater Carré in Amsterdam, Netherlands

1. Baby Love
2. When the Lovelight Starts Shining Through His Eyes
3. Let Me Go the Right Way

=== Oddments ===
- The DVD cover incorrectly lists 'Unchained Melody' as 'All My Love'.
- The DVD cover omits "Without a Song" from the track listing

== Personnel ==
- Diana Ross, lead vocals
- Mary Wilson, background vocals
- Florence Ballard, background vocals
- Cindy Birdsong, Background vocals
