= The Ultimate Collection (The Supremes album) =

Compilation album by Diana Ross & The Supremes
- Released: October 7, 1997
- Recorded: 1963–1969
- Genre: Soul music
- Length: 71:26
- Label: Motown Records
- Producer: Harry Weinger

Diana Ross & The Supremes chronology
You Keep Me Hangin' On (1997)	The Ultimate Collection (1997)	40 Golden Motown Greats (1998)

Professional ratings
Review scores
Source	Rating
Allmusic	5/5 stars
The Rolling Stone Album Guide	4/5 stars

The Ultimate Collection is a compact disc by Diana Ross and the Supremes, released on Motown Records, catalogue 314530827-2, in October 1997. It is a collection of singles comprising many of the group's greatest hits, with liner notes written by Diane Marie Weathers.

== Content ==
The disc contains every Top 40 hit on the Billboard Hot 100 enjoyed by The Supremes while Diana Ross was a member of the group. The songs "I'm Gonna Make You Love Me" and "I'll Try Something New" are collaborations with and co-credited to their Motown colleagues, The Temptations. Every iconic song by the group during this period is present, and twelve of the 25 tracks here topped the chart. Historically, only Elvis Presley, The Beatles, Michael Jackson, and Mariah Carey have had more #1 singles chart hits in the United States. The disc was part of an "Ultimate Collection" series issued that year by Motown for many of their top-selling classic artists.

Starting in the late 1960s and early 1970s, standard industry practice shifted to a focus on album sales, where a single became less a separate entity and more simply an advertisement for an LP, and a lead single would be pulled off an album as a promotional tool. Prior to this, singles were concentrated upon as a profitable commodity, especially for smaller record labels, and albums were often built around already successful singles. Since Motown fixated on the hit single until the very end of its stay in Detroit, single versions of songs often featured different mixes than versions that would be later placed on albums. Singles were usually mixed "punchier" and "hotter" to sound better on car radios receiving AM broadcast. The single versions are the ones appearing here.

== Personnel ==
- Diana Ross — lead vocals
- Mary Wilson — vocals
- Florence Ballard — vocals tracks 1–16
- Cindy Birdsong — vocals tracks 17–25
- The Funk Brothers — instruments
- Members of the Detroit Symphony Orchestra conducted by Gordon Staples — strings

== Track listing ==
Singles chart peak positions from Billboard charts; no R&B chart existed from November 30, 1963, through January 23, 1965. Tracks with The Temptations marked with an asterisk.

Track	Catalogue	Release date	Pop Chart	R&B Chart	Song title	Writer(s)	Time
1.	Motown 1051	10/31/63	#23		"When the Lovelight Starts Shining Through His Eyes"	Brian Holland, Lamont Dozier, and Edward Holland Jr.	3:09
2.	Motown 1060	6/17/64	#1		"Where Did Our Love Go"	Brian Holland, Lamont Dozier, and Edward Holland Jr.	2:33
3.	Motown 1066	9/17/64	#1		"Baby Love"	Brian Holland, Lamont Dozier, and Edward Holland Jr.	2:35
4.	Motown 1068	10/27/64	#1	#3	"Come See About Me"	Brian Holland, Lamont Dozier, and Edward Holland Jr.	2:40
5.	Motown 1074	2/8/65	#1	#2	"Stop! In the Name of Love"	Brian Holland, Lamont Dozier, and Edward Holland Jr.	2:52
6.	Motown 1075	4/15/65	#1	#1	"Back in My Arms Again"	Brian Holland, Lamont Dozier, and Edward Holland Jr.	2:55
7.	Motown 1080	7/19/65	#11	#6	"Nothing but Heartaches"	Brian Holland, Lamont Dozier, and Edward Holland Jr.	2:42
8.	Motown 1083	10/6/65	#1	#2	"I Hear a Symphony"	Brian Holland, Lamont Dozier, and Edward Holland Jr.	2:42
9.	Motown 1089	12/29/65	#5	#10	"My World Is Empty Without You"	Brian Holland, Lamont Dozier, and Edward Holland Jr.	2:35
10.	Motown 1094	4/8/66	#9	#7	"Love Is Like an Itching in My Heart"	Brian Holland, Lamont Dozier, and Edward Holland Jr.	2:54
11.	Motown 1097	7/25/66	#1	#1	"You Can't Hurry Love"	Brian Holland, Lamont Dozier, and Edward Holland Jr.	2:52
12.	Motown 1101	10/12/66	#1	#1	"You Keep Me Hangin' On"	Brian Holland, Lamont Dozier, and Edward Holland Jr.	2:45
13.	Motown 1103	1/11/67	#1	#1	"Love Is Here and Now You're Gone"	Brian Holland, Lamont Dozier, and Edward Holland Jr.	2:47
14.	Motown 1107	3/20/67	#1	#12	"The Happening"	Brian Holland, Lamont Dozier, and Edward Holland Jr.	2:50
15.	Motown 1111	7/24/67	#2	#4	"Reflections"	Brian Holland, Lamont Dozier, and Edward Holland Jr.	2:50
16.	Motown 1116	10/25/67	#9	#16	"In and Out of Love"	Brian Holland, Lamont Dozier, and Edward Holland Jr.	2:40
17.	Motown 1122	2/29/68	#28	#17	"Forever Came Today"	Brian Holland, Lamont Dozier, and Edward Holland Jr.	3:18
18.	Motown 1126	5/21/68	#30	#43	"Some Things You Never Get Used To"	Nickolas Ashford and Valerie Simpson	2:25
19.	Motown 1135	9/30/68	#1	#2	"Love Child"	Pamela Sawyer, R. Dean Taylor, Frank Wilson, Deke Richards	3:00
20.	Motown 1139	1/6/69	#10	#8	"I'm Livin' in Shame"	Pamela Sawyer, R. Dean Taylor, Frank Wilson, Henry Cosby, Berry Gordy	3:08
21.	Motown 1137	11/21/68	#2	#2	"I'm Gonna Make You Love Me" *	Kenneth Gamble and Jerry Ross	3:07
22.	Motown 1142	2/20/69	#25	#8	"I'll Try Something New" *	Smokey Robinson	2:33
23.	Motown 1146	3/27/69	#27	#21	"The Composer"	Smokey Robinson	2:55
24.	Motown 1148	5/9/69	#31	#17	"No Matter What Sign You Are"	Henry Cosby and Berry Gordy	2:55
25.	Motown 1156	10/14/69	#1	#1	"Someday We'll Be Together"	Jackey Beavers, Johnny Bristol, Harvey Fuqua	3:32
