= Greatest Hits (The Supremes album) =

1967 greatest hits album by Diana Ross & the Supremes

Greatest hits album by Diana Ross & the Supremes
- Released: August 29, 1967
- Recorded: 1963–1967
- Genres: Pop; R&B
- Length: 55:02
- Label: Motown
- Producers: Brian Holland; Lamont Dozier

Diana Ross & the Supremes chronology
The Supremes Sing Rodgers & Hart (1967)	Greatest Hits (1967)	Reflections (1968)

European Tamla-Motown cover

Singles from Greatest Hits
- 1. "The Happening" Released: March 20, 1967

Professional ratings
Review scores
Source	Rating
Allmusic	5/5 stars
Rolling Stone	4/5 stars

Diana Ross & the Supremes: Greatest Hits (also released as The Supremes: Greatest Hits) is a two-LP collection of singles and B-sides recorded by the Supremes, released by Motown in August 1967 (see 1967 in music). The collection was the first LP to credit the group under the new billing "Diana Ross & the Supremes". Although founding member Florence Ballard is pictured on all album artwork and sings on all the tracks, by the time the set was released, she had been fired from the group and replaced by Cindy Birdsong.

It would rank as their second number one album, holding a distinction that would take decades for another female group to achieve. The 2-LP set topped the Billboard Top LPs chart for 5 consecutive weeks, spending 20 weeks in the top 5 and 24 weeks total in the top 10. It remained on the chart for 89 weeks. By December 28, 1968, the album had raised more than $3 million in sales. Greatest Hits spent three weeks at number one on the UK Albums Chart, becoming the first album by an all-female group to top the charts there, a feat the group had previously achieved in the US with The Supremes A' Go-Go. In 2018, the Official Charts Company published that the album had a total of 60 weeks in the UK top 40; making it the 4th "longest-reigning Top 40 girl group album ever".

== Overview ==
Greatest Hits includes fifteen Supremes singles, 10 of which went to number-one, among them were "Where Did Our Love Go", "Stop! In the Name of Love", "You Can't Hurry Love", and the most recent Supremes number-one, "The Happening" (a non-album track from the 1967 film of the same name). Also included are five popular Supremes B-sides: "Standing at the Crossroads of Love", "Ask Any Girl", "There's No Stopping Us Now", "Everything Is Good About You", and "Whisper You Love Me Boy".

The packaging for the set includes liner notes by actress Carol Channing (which were originally written for the unreleased album The Supremes and the Motown Sound: From Broadway to Hollywood) and paintings by Robert Taylor, including collectable 12 inch by 12 inch pin-up portraits of Diana Ross, Florence Ballard, and Mary Wilson. Greatest Hits was their second number-one album on the Billboard 200 and their fifth on the Hot R&B LP's charts in the United States. It also reached the top of the pop album chart in the United Kingdom. The album sold over six million copies worldwide as of 1988. However, it was never accorded Platinum status as Motown did not submit to RIAA certification until years later.

Although not nominally credited because of their increasingly estranged relationship with Motown, all of the songs included were produced by the songwriting/production team of Holland–Dozier–Holland.

=== Release ===
- Greatest Hits was released overseas in some markets shortened to one LP. The track listing for this version includes only the major singles, omitting "Ask Any Girl", "Standing at the Crossroads of Love", "Everything Is Good About You", "There's No Stopping Us Now", "When the Lovelight Starts Shining Through His Eyes", and "Run, Run, Run".
- Diana Ross & the Supremes: Greatest Hits is regularly referred to as Diana Ross & the Supremes: Greatest Hits, Vols. 1 & 2, as its 1969 single-disc follow-up is titled Greatest Hits Vol. 3. Vol. 3 was also a million-seller. The double-LP was issued by Motown as two separate halves in 1986.
- Greatest Hits Vol. 1, Greatest Hits Vol. 2, Greatest Hits Vol. 3, and the American variant of The Supremes: At Their Best (a greatest hits collection for the post-Ross 1970s Supremes) were compiled and issued as The Supremes: Gold in 2005.

Cover artwork of the Supremes by Robert Taylor which is featured on the Greatest Hits American release.

== Track listing ==
All songs produced by Brian Holland and Lamont Dozier. All songs written by Holland–Dozier–Holland unless otherwise noted. Superscripts denote original album sources, referenced below.

=== LP One ===
==== Side 1 ====
1. "When the Lovelight Starts Shining Through His Eyes" ^{a} – 2:38
2. "Where Did Our Love Go" ^{a} – 2:30
3. "Ask Any Girl" ^{a, b} – 2:44
4. "Baby Love" ^{a} – 2:37
5. "Run, Run, Run" ^{a} – 2:30

==== Side 2 ====
1. "Stop! In the Name of Love" ^{b} – 2:53
2. "Back in My Arms Again" ^{b} – 2:52
3. "Come See About Me" ^{a} – 2:42
4. "Nothing but Heartaches" ^{b} – 2:57
5. "Everything Is Good About You" (James Dean, Edward Holland Jr.) ^{c} – 2:57

=== LP Two ===
==== Side 3 ====
1. "I Hear a Symphony" ^{c} – 2:38
2. "Love Is Here and Now You're Gone" ^{e} – 2:46
3. "My World Is Empty Without You" ^{c} – 2:33
4. "Whisper You Love Me Boy" ^{b} – 2:40
5. "The Happening" (Holland-Dozier-Holland, Frank De Vol) – 2:49

==== Side 4 ====
1. "You Keep Me Hangin' On" ^{e} – 2:40
2. "You Can't Hurry Love" ^{d} – 2:45
3. "Standing at the Crossroads of Love" ^{a} – 2:27
4. "Love Is Like an Itching in My Heart" ^{d} – 2:55
5. "There's No Stopping Us Now" ^{e} – 2:55

Notes

- ^{a} from Where Did Our Love Go (1964).
- ^{b} from More Hits by the Supremes (1965).
- ^{c} from I Hear a Symphony (1966).
- ^{d} from The Supremes A' Go-Go (1966).
- ^{e} from The Supremes Sing Holland–Dozier–Holland (1967).
- "The Happening" was a new inclusion for the album. The single "Reflections" was originally also intended for inclusion, but was heldover and replaced with "Standing at the Crossroads of Love". "Reflections" was included on the subsequent Reflections LP in March 1968.

== Personnel ==
- Diana Ross – lead vocals
- Mary Wilson – background vocals
- Florence Ballard – background vocals
- The Andantes – additional background vocals (side 2, track 1 / side 4, track 5)
- The Four Tops, Holland–Dozier–Holland – additional background vocals (side 1, tracks 1 and 5)
- The Love Tones – additional backing vocals (side 4, track 3)
- Brian Holland – producer
- Lamont Dozier – producer
- The Funk Brothers – instrumentation (except side 3, track 2)
- Los Angeles studio musicians – instrumentation (side 3, track 2)

== Charts ==
=== Weekly charts ===
Chart (1967)	Peak position
Norwegian Albums (VG-lista)	8
UK Albums (Official Charts)	1
UK R&B Albums (Record Mirror)	1
US Billboard 200	1
US Top R&B/Hip-Hop Albums (Billboard)	1
US Record World	1

=== Year-end charts ===
Chart (1967)	Rank
US Billboard 200	95
US Top R&B/Hip-Hop Albums (Billboard)	6
US Cashbox Top 100	34
Chart (1968)	Rank
UK Albums (OCC)	3
US Cashbox Top 100	29

== Certifications ==
Region	Certification	Certified units/sales
United States	—	1,000,000

== See also ==
- List of Billboard number-one R&B albums of the 1960s
