= Live at London's Talk of the Town =

Live album by Diana Ross & the Supremes
- Released: August 26, 1968
- Recorded: February 1968, London, England
- Genre: Pop; showtunes; R&B
- Length: 38:19
- Label: Motown
- Producer: Tony Palmer

Diana Ross & the Supremes chronology
Reflections (1968)	Live at London's Talk of the Town (1968)	Diana Ross & the Supremes Sing and Perform "Funny Girl" (1968)

Professional ratings
Review scores
Source	Rating
Allmusic	link
The Rolling Stone Album Guide	2/5 stars

Live at London's Talk of the Town is a 1968 live album released by Diana Ross & the Supremes on the Motown label, recorded at the Talk of the Town nightclub. This performance marked the first time that new member Cindy Birdsong had performed overseas with original Supremes Diana Ross and Mary Wilson, a year after original founding member Florence Ballard was ousted. The group performed a variation of standards, show tunes, and their own classics with British rock stars Mick Jagger and Paul McCartney reportedly in attendance. The songs recorded are from the group's 1968 European tour. That European tour also garnered a famous Swedish television special that was used as a catalyst to promote this album.

Songs recorded, but omitted from the final album tracklist are "Unchained Melody", "Somewhere," "Queen of the House", and "the Sam Cooke Medley".

== Track listing ==
=== Side one ===
1. Medley – 4:23
  1. "With a Song in My Heart" (Richard Rodgers, Lorenz Hart)
  2. "Stranger in Paradise" (Alexander Borodin, Robert C. Wright, George Forrest)
  3. "Wonderful! Wonderful!" (Sherman Edwards, Donald Meyer, Ben Raleigh)
  4. "Without a Song" (Vincent Youmans, Edward Eliscu, Billy Rose)
2. Medley (Holland–Dozier–Holland) – 3:24
  1. "Stop! In the Name of Love"
  2. "Come See About Me"
  3. "My World Is Empty Without You"
  4. "Baby Love"
3. "Love Is Here and Now You're Gone" (Holland-Dozier-Holland) – 1:54
4. "More (Theme from Mondo Cane)" (Marcello Ciorciolini, Riziero Ortolani, Nino Oliviero, Norman Newell) – 2:29
5. "You Keep Me Hangin' On" (Holland-Dozier-Holland) – 2:19
6. Medley (Lennon–McCartney) – 3:47
  1. "Michelle"
  2. "Yesterday"

=== Side two ===
1. "In and Out of Love" (Holland-Dozier-Holland) – 2:49
2. Medley – 3:23
  1. "The Lady Is a Tramp" (Rodgers, Hart)
  2. "Let's Get Away from It All" (Matt Dennis, Thomas Adair)
3. "The Happening" (Holland-Dozier-Holland, Frank De Vol) – 1:59
4. Medley - 5:12
  1. "Thoroughly Modern Millie" (Jimmy Van Heusen, Sammy Cahn)
  2. "Second Hand Rose" (James Hanley, Grant Clarke, Harlan Howard)
  3. "Mame" (Jerry Herman)
5. "Reflections" (Holland-Dozier-Holland) – 2:50
6. "You're Nobody till Somebody Loves You" (James Cavanaugh, Russ Morgan, Larry Stock) – 3:50

== Credits ==
- Diana Ross: lead vocals
- Mary Wilson and Cindy Birdsong: background vocals
- Produced by Tony Palmer
- Orchestra conducted by Jimmy Garrett (bass)
- Recording engineer: Malcolm Addey
- Cover photo by Rob Walls

== Chart history ==
Chart (1968)	Peak position
UK Albums (OCC)	6
UK R&B Albums (Record Mirror)	3
US Billboard 200	57
US Top R&B/Hip-Hop Albums (Billboard)	7
