= There's a Place for Us =

Compilation album by The Supremes
- Released: July 9, 2004
- Recorded: January–April 1965 (original album); 1965–1967 (bonus tracks)
- Genre: Pop, show tunes, R&B
- Length: 33:10 (original version); 77:36 (exp. version)
- Label: Motown; Hip-O
- Producer: Marc Gordon; Hal Davis; Harvey Fuqua; William "Mickey" Stevenson; Ivy Jo Hunter; Brian Holland; Lamont Dozier

The Supremes chronology
Joined Together: The Complete Studio Duets (2004)	There's a Place for Us (2004)	The Supremes: Gold (2005)

Professional ratings
Review scores
Source	Rating
AllMusic	4/5 stars

There's a Place for Us is an album recorded by Motown girl group The Supremes in 1965, for many years the most famous of the trio's unreleased albums. The album, composed of show-tunes and pop standards, was released by Motown and Hip-O Records in 2004.

== Overview ==
There's a Place for Us was recorded in late 1964 and through the first half of 1965, and was to have been issued in the summer of that year to tie in with the group's debut appearance at the famous Copacabana nightclub in New York City. Supremes members Diana Ross, Florence Ballard and Mary Wilson worked with two sets of producers, one in Los Angeles, the other in Detroit. The album was postponed and finally cancelled, with the live album The Supremes at the Copa being released in November 1965. Several standards similar to those recorded for this album appeared on the Supremes' next studio album, 1966's I Hear a Symphony, whose cover is similar to that intended for There's a Place for Us.

Several selections from There's a Place for Us would remain a staple of the group's live act for several years to come, most notably "You're Nobody till Somebody Loves You" and "Somewhere" from West Side Story. The album's title is derived from the first stanza of "Somewhere's" lyrics.

In 2004, Hip-O Select remastered and released the album, with the original artwork and liner notes, in compact disc and digital download formats. Hip-O also expanded the original twelve tracks to twenty-six by incorporating selections from aborted album projects such as Tribute to the Girls (to have been released in late 1965/early 1966) and The Supremes And The Motown Sound: From Broadway To Hollywood (to have been released in 1967), as well as outtakes from released albums.

Mary Wilson sings lead on "Our Day Will Come", while Florence Ballard sings lead on "People". Diana Ross sings lead on the remaining songs. They are all featured on an original number, "Fancy Passes".

== Original track listing ==
=== Side one ===
1. "Rock-a-Bye Your Baby with a Dixie Melody"
2. "Fancy Passes"
3. "The Boy from Ipanema"
4. "Put on a Happy Face"
5. "Our Day Will Come"
6. "You're Nobody till Somebody Loves You"

=== Side two ===
1. "Somewhere"
2. "Something for My Heart"
3. "Make Someone Happy" (Jule Styne/Betty Comden/Adolph Green)
4. "Little Miss Loser"
5. "Sleep Walk"
6. "Big City Babies Don't Cry"

== Expanded CD track listing ==
1. "Rock-a-Bye Your Baby with a Dixie Melody"
2. "Fancy Passes"
3. "The Boy from Ipanema"
4. "Put on a Happy Face"
5. "Our Day Will Come"
6. "You're Nobody till Somebody Loves You"
7. "Somewhere"
8. "Something for My Heart"
9. "Make Someone Happy"
10. "Little Miss Loser"
11. "Sleep Walk"
12. "Big City Babies Don't Cry"
13. "People"
14. "I Am Woman, You Are Man"
15. "Around the World in 80 Days"
16. "Sincerely"
17. "Mister Sandman"
18. "All of a Sudden My Heart Sings"
19. "If I Ruled the World"
20. "Strangers in the Night"
21. "The Sound of Music"
22. "Tender Is the Night"
23. "What Now My Love"
24. "Who Can I Turn To"
25. "The Shadow of Your Smile"
26. "Fancy Passes" (version 2)

== Personnel ==
- Diana Ross – lead vocals and Background Vocals on "People"
- Mary Wilson – Lead on "Our Day Will Come" and background vocals
- Florence Ballard – Lead on "People" and background vocals
- The Andantes – background vocals
- Marc Gordon – producer
- Hal Davis – producer
- Harvey Fuqua – producer
- William "Mickey" Stevenson – producer
- Ivy Jo Hunter – producer
- Brian Holland and Lamont Dozier – producers (bonus tracks only)
