= Merry Christmas (The Supremes album) =

Studio album by the Supremes
- Released: November 1, 1965
- Recorded: Los Angeles, July 1965 (Instrumental tracks); Hitsville USA (Studio A), September 1965 (vocals)
- Genres: Pop; Christmas; R&B
- Length: 34:50
- Label: Motown
- Producer: Harvey Fuqua

The Supremes chronology
| More Hits by The Supremes (1965) | Merry Christmas (1965) | I Hear a Symphony (1966) |

Professional ratings
Review scores
| Source | Rating |
|---|---|
| Allmusic | 4/5 stars |

Merry Christmas is the seventh studio album recorded by Motown girl group the Supremes, and released on Motown Records in November 1965 (see 1965 in music). The LP, produced by Harvey Fuqua, includes recordings of familiar Christmas songs such as "White Christmas", "Santa Claus Is Coming to Town", "My Favorite Things", and "Joy to the World". Two originals, "Children's Christmas Song" and "Twinkle Twinkle Little Me", were issued as a single.

In 1965, "Children's Christmas Song" peaked at number 12, whilst "Twinkle, Twinkle, Little Me" peaked at number 11 on the Billboard Christmas Singles chart, where it re-entered at number 29 in 1967. In Singapore, "Santa Claus Is Coming to Town" charted at number 4 on January 1, 1966 before peaking at number 1 on January 15, 1966 — the same week it charted at number 2 in Malaysia. In February 1966, "My Favorite Things" charted at number 10 in Singapore.

Merry Christmas, issued by Motown the same day as the live recording The Supremes at the Copa, was the only holiday album released by the Supremes. They charted four albums in 1965 with one hitting the Top 10 of the Billboard Top 200 album chart and this hitting the Top 10 of the Billboard Holiday Album Chart.

It was reissued in 1999 in CD form with four bonus tracks, including a cover of "Just a Lonely Christmas" (originally recorded by Harvey Fuqua's group The Moonglows), and a Florence Ballard-led version of "Silent Night". This expanded version of the album was re-released in 2003 as 20th Century Masters – The Best of the Supremes: The Christmas Collection. The Christmas album was later expanded further by 2015 (in both CD and Digital Download form) to include all 19 tracks recorded for the album, plus an additional track, "It Won't Be Long 'Til Christmas", from their canceled Disney album, a "Seasons Greetings" by the group, and a live performance of "My Favorite Things" done at the Copa. In 2017 The Ultimate Merry Christmas, a 2-CD set containing the original album in mono and stereo as well as an abundance of bonus material, was released by Second Disc Records and Real Gone Music.

Their version of "My Favorite Things" was featured in the 2018 Christmas film of The Grinch soundtrack.

== Track listing ==
=== Side one ===
1. "White Christmas" (Irving Berlin) − 3:54
2. "Silver Bells" (Ray Evans, Jay Livingston) − 2:58
3. "Born of Mary" (Traditional) − 2:50
4. "Children's Christmas Song" (Harvey Fuqua, Isabelle Freeman) − 2:53
5. "The Little Drummer Boy" (Katherine Kennicott Davis, Harry Simeone, Henry Onorati) − 3:08
6. "My Christmas Tree" (Jimmy Webb) − 3:12

=== Side two ===
1. "Rudolph the Red-Nosed Reindeer" (Johnny Marks) − 2:43
2. "Santa Claus Is Coming to Town" (J. Fred Coots, Haven Gillespie) − 2:42
3. "My Favorite Things" (Richard Rodgers, Oscar Hammerstein II) − 2:53
4. "Twinkle Twinkle Little Me" (Ron Miller, William O'Malley) − 3:04
5. "Little Bright Star" (Al Capps, Mary Dean) − 2:27
6. "Joy to the World" (Isaac Watts, Lowell Mason) − 2:12

=== 2015 Expanded Edition (MP3, 320 kbps) Bonus Tracks ===
1. "The Christmas Song (Merry Christmas to You)" (Mel Tormé, Bob Wells) *
2. "Just a Lonely Christmas" (Harvey Fuqua) *
3. "Noël" (Traditional) *
4. "O Little Town Of Bethlehem" (Lewis Redner and Phillips Brooks)
5. "Silent Night" (Joseph Mohr and Franz Xaver Gruber) ^{A} *
6. "O Holy Night" (Adolphe Adam) ^{A}
7. "Silver Bells" (Alternate track)
8. "Won't Be Long Before Christmas" (Richard M. Sherman, Robert B. Sherman)
9. "My Favorite Things" (Live At The Copa-1965) ^{B}
10. "Seasons Greetings" promo (Bonus Track) ^{B}

(*) Originally added to the 1999 CD album release as a bonus track. (^{A}) Led by Florence Ballard. (^{B}) Features Diana Ross, Florence Ballard and Mary Wilson.

Instrumental tracks for "Winter Wonderland" (Felix Bernard-Dick Smith) and "Santa Baby" were recorded; however no vocals were added to the tracks.

== Personnel ==
- Diana Ross – lead vocals (except where noted)
- Florence Ballard – lead vocals on "Silent Night" and "O Holy Night", background vocals
- Mary Wilson – background vocals
- The Andantes – background vocals
- Berry Gordy IV, Chico Ross, Joy Gordy, Terry Gordy – backing vocals on "Children's Christmas Song"
- Los Angeles musicians – instrumentation
- Harvey Fuqua – producer (except where noted)
- Frank Wilson – producer on "Won't Be Long Before Christmas" (bonus track)
- Gene Page, H.B. Barnum and Ernie Freeman – arrangements

== Singles releases ==
- "Children's Christmas Song" b/w "Twinkle Twinkle Little Me" (Motown 1085, November 18, 1965)

== Charts ==
| Chart (1965) | Peak position |
|---|---|
| US Christmas Records (Billboard) | 6 |
| Chart (1967) | Peak position |
| US Christmas Records (Billboard) | 38 |
| Chart (1970) | Peak position |
| US Christmas LP's (Billboard) | 26 |
