= The Supremes Sing Rodgers & Hart =

Studio album by the Supremes
- Released: May 22, 1967
- Recorded: 1966–1967
- Genres: Pop; show tunes; R&B
- Label: Motown
- Producers: Berry Gordy; Gil Askey

The Supremes chronology
The Supremes Sing Holland–Dozier–Holland (1967)	The Supremes Sing Rodgers & Hart (1967)	Greatest Hits (1967)

Professional ratings
Review scores
Source	Rating
AllMusic	4/5 stars

The Supremes Sing Rodgers & Hart is the eleventh studio album released by the Supremes for Motown in 1967. The album is wholly composed of covers of show tunes written by the songwriting duo of Richard Rodgers and Lorenz Hart. The album's liner notes were written by Gene Kelly. The Supremes Sing Rodgers & Hart was the final album released before The Supremes' name was changed to "Diana Ross & the Supremes," and member Florence Ballard was replaced by Cindy Birdsong.

Recording sessions for the album began in Los Angeles in October 1966, after the Supremes taped the ABC Stage 67 special Rodgers & Hart Today the previous August. Bobby Darin, The Mamas and the Papas, Petula Clark, Count Basie and His Orchestra and the Doodletown Pipers also appeared. Quincy Jones served as musical director. The show first aired on March 2, 1967. Originally intended as a double album, The Supremes Sing Rodgers & Hart was halved before Motown issued it in May 1967. In 1986, two unreleased tracks from the Rodgers & Hart sessions were included in the Diana Ross & the Supremes' 25th Anniversary collection. Several more were included alongside the original twelve LP tracks on The Rodgers & Hart Collection, an expanded compact disc collection released by Motown in 1987. All of the sessions, including a bonus live recording, were included on the 2002 Motown/Universal release The Supremes Sing Rodgers & Hart: The Complete Recordings.

== Track listing ==
All tracks written by Richard Rodgers and Lorenz Hart, produced by Berry Gordy and Gil Askey.

=== Side one ===
1. "The Lady Is a Tramp"
2. "Mountain Greenery"
3. "This Can't Be Love"
4. "Where or When"
5. "Lover"
6. "My Funny Valentine"

=== Side two ===
1. "My Romance"
2. "My Heart Stood Still"
3. "Falling in Love with Love"
4. "Thou Swell"
5. "Dancing on the Ceiling"
6. "Blue Moon"

== Known outtakes ==
The following Rodgers/Hart compositions were also recorded by the Supremes for this album:

1. "Manhattan"
2. "The Blue Room"
3. "With a Song in My Heart"
4. "Spring is Here"
5. "Little Girl Blue"
6. "It Never Entered My Mind"
7. "There's a Small Hotel"
8. "You Took Advantage of Me"
9. "Bewitched, Bothered and Bewildered"
10. "Wait Till You See Him"
11. "I Didn't Know What Time It Was"
12. "Johnny One Note"
13. "I Could Write a Book"

Numbers 1 and 2 were first issued on the compilation Diana Ross & the Supremes' 25th Anniversary in 1986, while 3 through 12 were first issued on The Rodgers & Hart Collection in 1987. This collection sequenced the songs in order from slowest tempo to fastest, concluding with "Johnny One Note", and all the tracks were given new stereo mixes. All of these songs, plus a live medley of "The Lady is a Tramp/Let's Get Away from It All" recorded at the Copacabana in May 1967, were included in the collection The Supremes Sing Rodgers & Hart: The Complete Recordings in 2002. The versions of "You Took Advantage of Me" and "Bewitched, Bothered and Bewildered" included on the 2002 collection are alternate recordings to those previously issued. "I Could Write A Book" was previously unreleased and included on the 2002 collection. "Manhattan" was done as a duet with Florence Ballard and Diana Ross.

They promoted the album as special guest stars in an hour-long tribute to Rodgers & Hart on a network television special. The album peaked at No. 3 on the Billboard R&B Album chart and at No. 20 on the magazine's more heterogeneous Top 200 chart.

== Personnel ==
- Diana Ross – lead vocals
- Mary Wilson – background vocals, co-lead vocal on "Falling in Love with Love"
- Florence Ballard – background vocals, co-lead harmony vocal on "Manhattan"

== Charts ==
=== Weekly charts ===
Chart (1967)	Peak position
Canada Top Albums/CDs (RPM)	4
UK Albums (Official Charts)	25
US Billboard 200	20
US Top R&B/Hip-Hop Albums (Billboard)	3

=== Year-end charts ===
Chart (1967)	Rank
US Top R&B/Hip-Hop Albums (Billboard)	31
