= The Supremes at the Copa =

Live album by the Supremes
- Released: November 1, 1965
- Recorded: August 1965
- Venue: Copacabana, New York City
- Genre: Pop; showtunes; R&B
- Length: N/A
- Label: Motown
- Producer: Berry Gordy; Lawrence Horn

The Supremes chronology
More Hits by the Supremes (1965)	The Supremes at the Copa (1965)	I Hear a Symphony (1966)

Professional ratings
Review scores
Source	Rating
Allmusic	3/5 stars
Record Mirror	3/4 stars

The Supremes at the Copa is a live album by the Motown singing group the Supremes, recorded during their debut engagement at the prestigious Copacabana nightclub in New York City. Released in the late fall of 1965, At the Copa was the first live album issued by the Supremes, and the only live album issued by the group's best-known lineup of Diana Ross, Florence Ballard and Mary Wilson.

== History ==
=== Background ===
The Supremes were following Ella Fitzgerald, Lena Horne, Sammy Davis Jr., Sarah Vaughan, Nat King Cole and Sam Cooke, among the first African-American entertainers to appear at the Copa, and playing the club was seen by Motown CEO Berry Gordy as an in-roads into the conservative white middle-America market. Gordy and the Motown staff, including vocal director Maurice King and choreographer Cholly Atkins, invested significant amounts of time and money into preparing the Supremes for their Copa debut.

Tensions ran high at several points during the preparation stages. Florence Ballard was angered that her only solo number, "People", was dropped from the show while Ross herself complained about the group's staging and bristled under Gordy's criticisms of their performances. Nevertheless, the Copa engagement was a success, paving the way for several other Motown stars, including The Temptations, Marvin Gaye, Martha & the Vandellas and Smokey Robinson & the Miracles to secure play dates at the Copa.

After the success of their initial Copa engagement, Mary Wilson noted that the Supremes were "welcome to play any club in the world" The group would play engagements at the Copa for the next seven years, and eventually earned $20,000 a week for these performances, fees on the level of popular performers such as Sammy Davis Jr. and Dean Martin. Incidentally, Davis wrote the liner notes for this album.

=== Album release information ===
The Supremes at the Copa LP was issued by Motown on November 1, 1965; Motown also released the Supremes' Merry Christmas LP on the same date. At the Copa peaked at number 11 on the Billboard Top LPs albums chart, and at number six on the Billboard R&B Albums chart.

The performances included on the LP include several pop standards, four of the Supremes' number-one hit singles and a medley of songs by late soul star Sam Cooke. Berry Gordy and Motown's head engineer Lawrence Horn are credited as the producers, and the orchestra was arranged and conducted by Gil Askey. The release of The Supremes at the Copa led Motown to shelve a studio-record album of pop covers, There's a Place for Us, which featured many of the same songs as Copa, with the same arrangements.

The Supremes at the Copa does not include the group's entire set: for example, "From This Moment On" was the opening number in their Copa set, not "Put on a Happy Face". When the tapes were brought back to Detroit following the Copa engagement, it was discovered the recording quality did not come up to Motown quality standards as the acoustics at the Copa were not congenial to recording. Gordy had Ross re-record her vocals live in Motown's Hitsville U.S.A. studio. Reportedly, Ross did the studio vocals in one long take, doing the whole show as she would have at the Copa.

== Track listing ==
=== Side one ===
1. Opening Introduction
2. "Put On A Happy Face" (Lee Adams, Charles Strouse)
3. "I Am Woman, You Are Man" (Jule Styne, Bob Merrill)
4. "Baby Love" (Holland–Dozier–Holland)
5. "Stop! In the Name of Love" (Holland-Dozier-Holland)
6. "The Boy from Ipanema" (Antônio Carlos Jobim, Vinicius de Moraes, Norman Gimbel).
7. "Make Someone Happy" (Styne, Betty Comden, Adolph Green)
8. "Come See About Me" (Holland-Dozier-Holland)
9. "Rock-a-Bye Your Baby with a Dixie Melody" (Sam M. Lewis, Jean Schwartz, Joe Young)

=== Side two ===
1. "Queen of the House" (Roger Miller, Mary Taylor)
2. Group Introduction
3. "Somewhere" (Leonard Bernstein, Stephen Sondheim)
4. "Back in My Arms Again" (Holland-Dozier-Holland)
5. Sam Cooke Medley (Sam Cooke)
  1. "You Send Me"
  2. "Cupid"
  3. "Chain Gang"
  4. "Bring It On Home To Me"
  5. "Shake"
  6. "(I Love You) For Sentimental Reasons"
6. "You're Nobody till Somebody Loves You" (James Cavanaugh, Russ Morgan, Larry Stock)

== Expanded Edition ==
On May 12, 2012, Universal Music Group released At the Copa: Expanded Edition, a two-disc limited edition re-release. Disc one contains the digitally remastered original stereo album – an album that, owing to then-insurmountable technical problems, used lead vocals overdubbed by Diana Ross in the studio. Also on disc one are 10 specially selected, previously unreleased original mono reference mixes, with Ross’s original live vocals. Disc two features the full Copa show, as the audience would have experienced it in 1965, in a brand-new mix that compiles the best performances from six recorded shows. Technology allowed the producers to overcome issues that vexed their 1960s counterparts, resulting not only in the use of the original lead vocals but the inclusion of songs cut from the original release: the opening number “From This Moment On,” their hits “Where Did Our Love Go” and “Nothing But Heartaches,” and classic show tunes including “Tonight/The Way You Look Tonight,” and “Enjoy Yourself (It’s Later than You Think).”

== Personnel ==
- Diana Ross - lead vocals
- Florence Ballard - background vocals
- Mary Wilson - background vocals and co-lead vocals in “Enjoy Yourself (It’s Later Than You Think).”
- Berry Gordy and Lawrence Horn - producers
- Gil Askey - bandleader, arranger, conductor
- Bob Cousar - drums
- Joe Mack - bass

== Chart history ==
=== Weekly charts ===
Chart (1965)	Peak position
US Billboard 200	11
US Top R&B/Hip-Hop Albums (Billboard)	6

=== Year-end charts ===
Chart (1966)	Rank
US Top R&B/Hip-Hop Albums (Billboard)	23
US Cashbox Top 100	58
