= The Supremes Sing Holland–Dozier–Holland =

Studio album by the Supremes
- Released: January 23, 1967
- Recorded: 1964–1966
- Studios: Hitsville U.S.A., Detroit and in Los Angeles
- Genres: Soul; R&B
- Length: 31:40
- Label: Motown
- Producers: Brian Holland; Lamont Dozier

The Supremes chronology
The Supremes A' Go-Go (1966)	The Supremes Sing Holland–Dozier–Holland (1967)	The Supremes Sing Rodgers & Hart (1967)

The Supremes Sing Motown

Singles from The Supremes Sing Holland-Dozier-Holland
- 1. "You Keep Me Hangin' On" Released: October 12, 1966; 2. "Love Is Here and Now You're Gone" Released: January 11, 1967

Professional ratings
Review scores
Source	Rating
AllMusic	4/5 stars

The Supremes Sing Holland–Dozier–Holland (issued in Europe as The Supremes Sing Motown) is the tenth studio album released by the Supremes for Motown in 1967. It includes the number-one hit singles "You Keep Me Hangin' On" and "Love Is Here and Now You're Gone". As the title states: all songs on the album were written and produced by Motown's main songwriting team of Holland–Dozier–Holland, with additional credit given to R. Dean Taylor. Most of the album was recorded during the spring and summer of 1966; however, several songs date back to the summer of 1964.

Included alongside these songs are a handful of other originals, including "Remove This Doubt" and "You're Gone, But Always in My Heart", among others. Also present on the album are covers of H-D-H penned songs for Motown artists The Isley Brothers ("I Guess I'll Always Love You"), The Four Tops ("It's the Same Old Song", "I'll Turn to Stone"), and Martha and the Vandellas ("(Love Is Like a) Heat Wave")

== Overview ==
This was the group's final album fully overseen by the songwriting team of Holland–Dozier–Holland. Within months of this release, the trio would stage a work slowdown in protest to Motown CEO's Berry Gordy's business decisions. By the end of 1967, H-D-H had departed Motown, but not before producing four final Supremes singles ("The Happening", "Reflections", "In and Out of Love", and "Forever Came Today").

"You're Gone But Always In My Heart" had been the flip side of the Supremes' single "Come See About Me." It was scheduled for the album More Hits by The Supremes but removed and replaced by a remixed version of the single "Ask Any Girl" with thought of releasing it as a single again with the remix. The song title was changed because of royalty confusions with the standard "Always in My Heart." "Love Is In Our Hearts" contains different lead vocals on the monaural and stereo versions of the original LP.

== Track listing ==
All songs written by Holland–Dozier–Holland and produced by Brian Holland and Lamont Dozier. "Mother You, Smother You" and "I'll Turn to Stone" were co-written by R. Dean Taylor.

=== Side one ===
1. "You Keep Me Hangin' On" – 2:43
2. "You're Gone, But Always in My Heart" – 2:36
3. "Love Is Here and Now You're Gone" – 2:48
4. "Mother You, Smother You" – 2:36
5. "I Guess I'll Always Love You" – 2:40
6. "I'll Turn to Stone" – 2:24

=== Side two ===
1. "It's the Same Old Song" – 2:32
2. "Going Down for the Third Time" – 2:36
3. "Love is in Our Hearts" – 2:09
4. "Remove This Doubt" – 2:54
5. "There's No Stopping Us Now" – 2:59
6. "(Love Is Like a) Heat Wave" – 2:37

== Personnel ==
The Supremes

- Diana Ross – lead vocals
- Florence Ballard – background vocals (side 1: tracks 1–6; side 2: tracks 2–6)
- Mary Wilson – background vocals (side 1: tracks 1–6; side 2: tracks 2–6)

Additional personnel

- The Andantes – Additional background vocals (side 1: track 3; side 2: tracks 1–2 and 5–6)
- Brian Holland, Lamont Dozier – producers
- The Funk Brothers – instrumentation

== Charts ==
=== Weekly charts ===
Chart (1967)	Peak position
UK Albums (Official Charts)	15
UK R&B Albums (Record Mirror)	4
US Billboard 200	6
US Top R&B/Hip-Hop Albums (Billboard)	1

Chart (2018)	Peak position
UK Physical Albums (OCC)	80

=== Year-end charts ===
Chart (1967)	Rank
US Billboard 200	61
US Top R&B/Hip-Hop Albums (Billboard)	8
US Cashbox Top 100	30

== See also ==
- List of number-one R&B albums of 1967 (U.S.)
