= Reflections (The Supremes album) =

Studio album by Diana Ross & the Supremes
- Released: March 25, 1968
- Recorded: 1966–1968
- Genres: Pop-soul; R&B
- Length: 41:19
- Label: Motown
- Producers: Brian Holland; Lamont Dozier; Smokey Robinson

Diana Ross & the Supremes chronology
Greatest Hits (1967)	Reflections (1968)	Live at London's Talk of the Town (1968)

Singles from Reflections
- 1. "Reflections" Released: July 24, 1967; 2. "In and Out of Love" Released: October 25, 1967; 3. "Forever Came Today" Released: February 29, 1968

Reflections is the twelfth studio album recorded for Motown by Diana Ross & the Supremes. Released in 1968, it was the first regular studio LP to display the new billing of the group formerly known as "The Supremes." It contains the singles "Reflections", "In and Out of Love" and "Forever Came Today". Also included are covers of songs made famous by Martha and the Vandellas ("Love (Makes Me Do Foolish Things)") and The 5th Dimension ("Up, Up and Away"). Also present are songs written by other famous names, including "Bah-Bah-Bah" co-written by Motown singer Brenda Holloway with her younger sister, Patrice, an original Smokey Robinson composition titled "Then", and "What the World Needs Now Is Love" by Burt Bacharach and Hal David, which Motown planned to release as a single in the spring of 1968, but cancelled. It also contains a cover of Bobbie Gentry's "Ode to Billie Joe," whose original recording kept the single #2 "Reflections" from peaking at the top spot on the Billboard Hot 100 in September 1967, and it hit #2 on Cashbox.

The album includes the final songs the Supremes recorded with their main creative team of Holland–Dozier–Holland before the three writers/producers departed Motown over royalty and title disputes. Although Florence Ballard recorded some of this album before being fired from the group in July 1967, her replacement Cindy Birdsong along with Mary Wilson recorded several songs and appears on the album cover. Initially, the album cover included three photos with Ballard but it was quickly replaced with the cover featuring just Ross, Wilson and Birdsong. A photo of the original album cover can be found on Motown 45 rpm promotional sleeves issued in early 1968. One of the album's singles, "Forever Came Today", was later covered by The Jackson 5 on their 1975 album Moving Violation.

"In and Out of Love" was chosen to be the key song for the American Bandstand dance contest that year. Because of that exposure, the single remained #1 on American Bandstand's chart for an impressive four weeks. It outperformed "Reflections" with Dick Clark's audience affording the album two top three singles on that pivotal show.

== Track listing ==
Professional ratings
Review scores
Source	Rating
Allmusic	3/5 stars
The Rolling Stone Album Guide	3/5 stars

=== Side one ===
1. "Reflections" (Holland–Dozier–Holland) - 2:49
2. "I'm Gonna Make It (I Will Wait for You)" (Debbie Dean, Dennis Lussier) - 2:47
3. "Forever Came Today" (Holland-Dozier-Holland) - 2:59
4. "I Can't Make It Alone" (Holland-Dozier-Holland) - 2:57
5. "In and Out of Love" (Holland-Dozier-Holland) - 2:39
6. "Bah-Bah-Bah" (Brenda Holloway, Patrice Holloway) - 2:58

=== Side two ===
1. "What the World Needs Now Is Love" (Burt Bacharach, Hal David) - 2:50
2. "Up, Up and Away" (Jimmy Webb) - 2:30
3. "Love (Makes Me Do Foolish Things)" (Holland-Dozier-Holland) - 2:51
4. "Then" (Smokey Robinson, Robert Rogers, Warren Moore) - 2:08
5. "Misery Makes Its Home in My Heart" (Smokey Robinson, Warren Moore) - 2:52
6. "Ode to Billie Joe" (Bobbie Gentry) - 4:30

=== Unused Recordings from the Reflections timeframe ===
1. "My Guy" (Robinson)
2. "It's Going All The Way To True Love" (Fuqua-Bristol-DeMell-Verdi)
3. "Stay in My Lonely Arms" (Holland-Dozier-Holland)
4. "Heaven Must Have Sent You" (Holland-Dozier-Holland)
5. "Treat Me Nice John Henry" (Robinson)
6. "Am I Asking Too Much" (Richards-Taylor)
7. "All I Know About You" (Holland-Dozier-Holland-DeVol) (Released only as Motown 1107B (B-side of "The Happening", March 20, 1967)

== Personnel ==
- Diana Ross - lead vocals
- Mary Wilson - backing vocals (side 1, tracks 1–2 and 5–6; side 2, tracks 1, 4–5)
- Florence Ballard - backing vocals (side 1, tracks 1 and 5; side 2, track 1)
- Cindy Birdsong - backing vocals (side 1, tracks 2 and 6; side 2, track 4)
- The Andantes - backing vocals (side 1, tracks 3–5; side 2, tracks 2–3, 5)
- The Funk Brothers - instrumentation
- Brian Holland, Lamont Dozier - producers on all tracks unless otherwise noted
- Smokey Robinson - producer on "Then" and "Misery Makes Its Home in My Heart"

== Singles history ==
- "Reflections" b/w "Going Down for the Third Time" (B-side taken from The Supremes Sing Holland–Dozier–Holland) (Motown 1111, July 24, 1967)
- "In and Out of Love" b/w "I Guess I'll Always Love You" (B-side taken from The Supremes Sing Holland-Dozier-Holland) (Motown 1116, October 25, 1967)
- "Forever Came Today" b/w "Time Changes Things" (B-side taken from Meet The Supremes) (Motown 1122, February 29, 1968)

== Charts ==
=== Weekly charts ===
Chart (1968)	Peak position
Norwegian Albums (VG-lista)	20
UK Albums (Official Charts)	30
UK R&B Albums (Record Mirror)	4
US Billboard 200	18
US Top R&B/Hip-Hop Albums (Billboard)	3

=== Year-end charts ===
Chart (1968)	Rank
US Cashbox Top 100	90
