= Let's Get Away from It All =

Song
- Published: 1941
- Genre: Traditional pop
- Composer: Matt Dennis
- Lyricist: Tom Adair

"Let's Get Away from It All" is a popular song with music by Matt Dennis and lyrics by Tom Adair, published in 1941. (Note: Its copyright was renewed in 1968 under R433500)

The song is most commonly associated with Frank Sinatra (who had a hit with it as a member of The Pied Pipers while he was a part of Tommy Dorsey's orchestra and later for his Come Fly with Me album), but many others have recorded it and it is considered a standard of traditional pop music.

== Other recordings ==
- Martha Tilton and Harry Babbitt - a single release in 1950.
- Patti Page - Let's Get Away from It All (1958).
- Della Reese - for her album Della (1960)
- Louis Prima and Keely Smith - for their album Together (1960).
- Rosemary Clooney - Still on the Road (1994)

== In popular culture ==
During 1966 to 1969, The Supremes (Diana Ross, Florence Ballard, Mary Wilson) performed this song as part of a medley with "The Lady Is a Tramp" in nightclubs such as the Copacabana in 1967 and Roostertail in 1966. The 1968 album, Live at London's Talk of the Town, had the song included with the same medley.
