= Forever Came Today =

1968 single by the Supremes

- Side A of the Canadian single

Single by Diana Ross & the Supremes

from the album Reflections
- B-side: "Time Changes Things"
- Released: February 29, 1968
- Recorded: April 21 and December 20, 1967; January 1 and 23, 1968
- Studio: Hitsville U.S.A., Detroit, Michigan
- Genre: Pop, psychedelic pop
- Length: 3:12 (album/single version)
- Label: Motown; M 1122
- Songwriter: Holland–Dozier–Holland
- Producers: Lamont Dozier; Brian Holland

Diana Ross & the Supremes singles chronology
"In and Out of Love" (1967)	"Forever Came Today" (1968)	"Some Things You Never Get Used To" (1968)

Reflections track listing
- 12 tracks Side one: 1. "Reflections"; 2. "I'm Gonna Make It (I Will Wait For You)"; 3. "Forever Came Today"; 4. "I Can't Make It Alone"; 5. "In and Out of Love"; 6. "Bah-Bah-Bah"; Side two: 7. "What the World Needs Now Is Love"; 8. "Up, Up and Away"; 9. "Love (Makes Me Do Foolish Things)"; 10. "Then"; 11. "Misery Makes Its Home in My Heart"; 12. "Ode to Billie Joe"

Audio
- "Forever Came Today" by Diana Ross & the Supremes on YouTube

Live video
- "Forever Came Today" by Diana Ross & the Supremes, performed on The Ed Sullivan Show on YouTube

"Forever Came Today" is a 1968 song written and produced by the Motown collective of Holland–Dozier–Holland, and was first made into a hit as a single for Diana Ross & the Supremes in early 1968. A disco version of the song was released as a single seven years later by Motown group the Jackson 5.

== Overview ==
=== The Supremes version ===
The release of "Forever Came Today" was the result of a work slowdown by Holland-Dozier-Holland in late 1967. The song was originally cut in April 1967 with vocals added in December, 1967 and January, 1968. HDH, and particularly lyricist Eddie Holland, had become dissatisfied with both their pay and the working atmosphere at Motown, and resultantly created very little music during the latter half of the year.

With no other Supremes singles ready for release, Motown had "Forever Came Today" prepared for release as a single. Mary Wilson, in her autobiography Dreamgirl: My Life as a Supreme, reported that "Forever Came Today" was the first of a series of Supremes singles she did not sing on. Motown used their in-house session singers, The Andantes, to provide background vocal instead.

The single stalled for two weeks at number twenty-eight on the Billboard Hot 100 pop singles chart in spring 1968. It was their first American single not to reach the top 10 since "Nothing but Heartaches". The song's lyrics feature a woman who is amazed by her boyfriend's love that she has waited 'forever' for, hence the saying "my forever came today." In spite of its showings on the pop charts, Holland-Dozier-Holland uphold "Forever Came Today" as one of the best Motown songs they ever wrote. Cash Box praised "the stunning vocal sound of Diana Ross" and "superlative orchestral tension," saying the song had "fine dance appeal and lyrical attraction."

By the time of the single's release in early 1968, Holland-Dozier-Holland had staged a work slowdown and eventually no longer came to Motown's Hitsville U.S.A. studio. Motown sued for breach of contract in August 1968; HDH countersued. The trio went on to eventually start their own labels, Invictus Records and Hot Wax Records. Meanwhile, Berry Gordy was forced to find a new songwriting team for the Supremes, since Holland-Dozier-Holland had written all of the group's hit singles since 1963.

=== Track listing ===
- 7" single (29 February 1968) (North America/United Kingdom/Germany)
1. "Forever Came Today" – 2:59
2. "Time Changes Things" – 2:22

=== Chart history ===
Chart (1967–1968)	Peak position
Australia (Kent Music Report)	68
Canada Top Singles (RPM)	20
Netherlands (Dutch Top 40)	40
UK Singles (Official Charts)	28
UK R&B (Record Mirror)	7
US Billboard Hot 100	28
US Hot R&B/Hip-Hop Songs (Billboard)	17
US Cashbox Top 100	13
US Cashbox R&B	17
US Record World 100 Top Pops	15
US Record World Top 50 R&B	9

== The Jackson 5 version ==
"Forever Came Today"
- Side A of the New Zealand single

Single by the Jackson 5

from the album Moving Violation
- B-side: "All I Do Is Think of You"
- Released: June 1975
- Recorded: March 1975
- Studio: Motown Recording Studios, Hollywood, California
- Genre: Disco, funk
- Length: 6:05
- Label: Motown; M 1356
- Songwriter: Holland–Dozier–Holland
- Producer: Brian Holland

The Jackson 5 singles chronology
"I Am Love" (1974)	"Forever Came Today" (1975)	"All I Do Is Think of You" (1975)

The single was revived eight years later in a disco version by another Motown group, the Jackson 5. The Jacksons had replaced the Supremes as the label's top-selling act during the early 1970s and by 1975 were going through problems with Motown and making plans to leave the company. Released in June 1975, the Jackson 5's version peaked at number six on the soul chart and at number sixty on the pop chart. On the Billboard dance chart, it was the first of two releases by the Jacksons to hit number one. Record World said that the Jackson 5 "take this opportunity to salute their initial career sparker [Diana Ross] with a smash in return."

The single's B-side, "All I Do Is Think of You", was later extensively covered and sampled by contemporary R&B and hip hop artists.

=== Chart positions ===
Chart (1975)	Peak position
U.S. Billboard Hot 100	60
U.S. Billboard Disco File Top 20	1
U.S. Billboard Hot Black Singles	6
