= I Hear a Symphony (The Supremes album) =

Studio album by the Supremes
- Released: February 18, 1966
- Studio: Hitsville U.S.A., Detroit
- Genre: Pop; soul; R&B
- Length: 33:43
- Label: Motown
- Producer: Brian Holland; Lamont Dozier; Norman Whitfield

The Supremes chronology
The Supremes at the Copa (1965) --- Merry Christmas (1965)	I Hear a Symphony (1966)	The Supremes A' Go-Go (1966)

Singles from I Hear a Symphony
- 1. "I Hear a Symphony" Released: October 6, 1965; 2. "My World Is Empty Without You" Released: December 29, 1965

Professional ratings
Review scores
Source	Rating
AllMusic	4.5/5 stars
The Rolling Stone Album Guide	3/5 stars
Record Mirror	4/5 stars

I Hear a Symphony is the eighth studio album by the American girl group the Supremes, released by Motown in 1966

== Overview ==
I Hear a Symphony peaked at number 8 and remained on the Billboard 200 album chart for 55 weeks While originally issued in both mono and stereo versions, several of the tracks on the released stereo edition of I Hear a Symphony were sourced from mono mixes.

== Expanded edition ==
On September 21, 2012, Universal Music Group released I Hear A Symphony: Expanded Edition, a two-disc limited edition re-release. Disc one contains the digitally remastered original mono and stereo editions of the album, with most of the stereo edition being sourced from an alternate 1966 master done in true stereo as opposed to the original stereo LP release of the album. Also on disc one are alternate vocals and extended mixes, and an additional song "All Of A Sudden (My Heart Sings)," recorded for (but not included on) the original album. Disc two features a complete unreleased live show recorded at the Upper Deck of Detroit's Roostertail night club on September 26, 1966.

== Track listing ==
All songs produced by Brian Holland & Lamont Dozier.

=== Side one ===
1. "Stranger in Paradise" (Alexander Borodin, Robert C. Wright, George Forrest) – 3:03
2. "Yesterday" (Lennon–McCartney) – 2:28
3. "I Hear a Symphony" (Holland–Dozier–Holland) – 2:41
4. "Unchained Melody" (Alex North, Hy Zaret) – 3:47
5. "With a Song in My Heart" (Richard Rodgers, Lorenz Hart) – 2:02
6. "Without a Song" (Vincent Youmans, Edward Eliscu, Billy Rose) – 2:59

=== Side two ===
1. "My World Is Empty Without You" (Holland–Dozier–Holland) – 2:33
2. "A Lover's Concerto" (Sandy Linzer, Denny Randell) – 2:35
3. "Any Girl in Love (Knows What I'm Going Through)" (Holland–Dozier–Holland) – 2:59
4. "Wonderful! Wonderful!" (Sherman Edwards, Donald Meyer, Ben Raleigh) – 2:51
5. "Everything is Good About You" (James Dean, Eddie Holland) – 2:59
6. "He's All I Got" (Holland–Dozier–Holland, Dean) – 2:46

== Personnel ==
- Diana Ross – lead vocals
- Florence Ballard – background vocals (side 1: tracks 1, 3–5; side 2: tracks 1–6)
- Mary Wilson – background vocals (side 1: tracks 1, 3–5; side 2: tracks 1–6)
- The Andantes – additional background vocals (side 2: track 3)
- Brian Holland, Lamont Dozier – producers
- Instrumentation by the Funk Brothers and assorted LA musicians:
  - Earl Van Dyke – piano (side 1: track 3), organ (side 2: track 1)
  - James Gittens – piano (side 2: track 1)
  - James Jamerson – bass (side 1: track 3; side 2: track 1)
  - Richard "Pistol" Allen – drums (side 1: track 3)
  - Benny Benjamin – drums (side 2: track 1)
  - Jack Ashford – vibraphone (side 1: track 3; side 2: track 1)
  - Mike Terry – baritone saxophone (side 1: track 3; side 2: track 1)
  - Eddie Willis – guitar (side 1: track 3)
  - Robert White – guitar (side 1: track 3)
  - Joe Messina – guitar (side 2: track 1)
- The Detroit Symphony Orchestra – instrumentation (side 1: track 3; side 2: track 1)
- Paul Riser – string arrangements (side 1: track 3; side 2: track 1)
- Esther Gordy Edwards, J, Pryor – cover design

== Charts ==
=== Weekly charts ===
Chart (1966)	Peak position
UK R&B Albums (Record Mirror)	6
US Billboard 200	8
US Top R&B/Hip-Hop Albums (Billboard)	1

=== Year-end charts ===
Chart (1966)	Rank
US Billboard 200	80
US Top R&B/Hip-Hop Albums (Billboard)	21
US Cashbox Top 100	66

== Certifications ==
Region	Certification	Certified units/sales
United Kingdom (BPI) Sales since 2012	Silver	60,000^{‡}
^{‡} Sales+streaming figures based on certification alone.

== See also ==
- List of number-one R&B albums of 1966 (U.S.)
