= In and Out of Love (The Supremes song) =

- 1967 France single

Single by Diana Ross & the Supremes

from the album Reflections
- B-side: "I Guess I'll Always Love You"
- Released: October 25, 1967
- Recorded: Los Angeles: April 20, 1967 (instrumentation); Hitsville U.S.A. (Studio A): June 12–June 13, 1967 (Supremes); July 7, 1967 (Andantes)
- Genre: Sunshine pop, psychedelic pop
- Length: 2:38 (album/single version)
- Label: Motown; M 1116
- Songwriter: Holland–Dozier–Holland
- Producers: Lamont Dozier, Brian Holland

Diana Ross & the Supremes singles chronology
"Reflections" (1967)	"In and Out of Love" (1967)	"Forever Came Today" (1968)

Reflections track listing
- 12 tracks Side one: 1. "Reflections"; 2. "I'm Gonna Make It (I Will Wait For You)"; 3. "Forever Came Today"; 4. "I Can't Make It Alone"; 5. "In and Out of Love"; 6. "Bah-Bah-Bah"; Side two: 7. "What the World Needs Now Is Love"; 8. "Up, Up and Away"; 9. "Love (Makes Me Do Foolish Things)"; 10. "Then"; 11. "Misery Makes Its Home in My Heart"; 12. "Ode to Billie Joe"

"In and Out of Love" is a 1967 song recorded by The Supremes for the Motown label. It was the second single issued with the group's new billing of Diana Ross & the Supremes, the penultimate Supremes single written and produced by Motown production team Holland–Dozier–Holland, and the last single to feature the vocals of original member Florence Ballard.

== Recording ==
By the time of the recording of "In and Out of Love," The Supremes had become the most successful American music group of all time, with ten number-one pop singles on the Billboard Hot 100 to their credit. In the midst of their success, conflicts between Supremes members Diana Ross, Florence Ballard and Mary Wilson arose. Ballard was uneasy about the group's direction and felt her role was being reduced in the group she first founded.

Motown's premier production team Holland–Dozier–Holland (H–D–H) recorded the track for "In and Out of Love" originally in Detroit with the Funk Brothers on March 2, 1967 during the same session for "The Happening" and "Reflections," but subsequently rerecorded the track six weeks later in Los Angeles. Ross added her lead vocals on June 12, 1967 with Wilson and Ballard adding their vocals the following day on June 13. It would be Ballard's final session as a Supreme.

By mid-1967, H–D–H, like Ballard, grew increasingly frustrated with their position at Motown. Lyricist Eddie Holland convinced his brother Brian Holland and their partner Lamont Dozier to stage a work slowdown, and for much of 1967 the trio turned out virtually no product. After one last Supremes single, "Forever Came Today," in early 1968, H–D–H left Motown, prompting a series of lawsuits between the label and the songwriters that lasted over a decade.

By July 1967, Motown CEO Berry Gordy had fired Ballard, replacing her with Cindy Birdsong of Patti LaBelle & the Blue Belles. One week after her dismissal, the vocals of Ballard and fellow member Mary Wilson were overdubbed by in-house session singers the Andantes and multitracked for the final single. Diana Ross & The Supremes performed "In and Out of Love" live on CBS's The Ed Sullivan Show on Sunday, November 19, 1967.

The single proved immensely popular with the fans as it was chosen by American Bandstand voters to be the song they wanted for that summer's dance contest. It remained at No.1 for 4 (four) weeks on the American Bandstand chart.

== Reception ==
The release of "In and Out of Love" was successful, peaking at No.9 on the Billboard Hot 100, No.16 on the R&B Singles chart, and No.13 on the UK Singles Chart in late autumn 1967. The single also reached No.10 on the Cashbox chart. Cash Box said that it has "a witty combination of orchestration and beat a la Motor City with the sweep and splendor of a folk-country ballad." With this peak, the Supremes were the first female group -- and second female recording act after Brenda Lee -- to achieve nine consecutive top ten singles on the Billboard Hot 100.

== Personnel ==
- Lead vocals by Diana Ross
- Background vocals by Florence Ballard, Mary Wilson, and the Andantes (Jackie Hicks, Marlene Barrow and Louvain Demps)
- Instrumentation by Los Angeles musicians
  - Bass by Carol Kaye

== Track listing ==
- 7" single (25 October 1967) (North America/United Kingdom/Spain)
1. "In and Out of Love" – 2:36
2. "I Guess I'll Always Love You" – 2:43

== Charts ==
=== Weekly charts ===
Chart (1967–1968)	Peak position
Australia (Go-Set)	26
Australia (Kent Music Report)	30
Canada Top Singles (RPM)	10
Netherlands (Dutch Top 40 Tipparade)	5
UK Singles (Official Charts)	13
UK R&B (Record Mirror)	3
US Billboard Hot 100	9
US Hot R&B/Hip-Hop Songs (Billboard)	16
US Cashbox Top 100	10
US Cashbox R&B	5
US Record World 100 Top Pops	8

=== Year-end charts ===
Chart (1967)	Rank
Canada Top Singles (RPM)	49
