= My World Is Empty Without You =

Single by the Supremes

from the album I Hear a Symphony
- B-side: "Everything Is Good About You"
- Released: December 29, 1965
- Recorded: December 2, 1965
- Studio: Hitsville U.S.A. (Studio A), Detroit
- Genre: Baroque pop, soul
- Length: 2:33
- Label: Motown; M 1089
- Songwriter: Holland–Dozier–Holland
- Producers: Brian Holland; Lamont Dozier

The Supremes singles chronology
| "I Hear a Symphony" (1965) | "My World Is Empty Without You" (1965) | "Love Is Like an Itching in My Heart" (1966) |

I Hear a Symphony track listing
- 12 tracks Side one: 1. "Stranger in Paradise"; 2. "Yesterday"; 3. "I Hear a Symphony"; 4. "Unchained Melody"; 5. "With a Song in My Heart"; 6. "Without a Song"; Side two: 7. "My World Is Empty Without You"; 8. "A Lover's Concerto"; 9. "Any Girl in Love (Knows What I'm Going Through)"; 10. "Wonderful! Wonderful!"; 11. "Everything is Good About You"; 12. "He's All I Got"

"My World Is Empty Without You" is a 1965 song recorded and released as a single by the Supremes for the Motown label.

== Overview ==
Written and produced by Motown's main production team of Holland–Dozier–Holland, the song's fast tempo accompanies a somber lyric which delves into the feelings of depression which can set in after a breakup.

"My World Is Empty Without You" was one of the few songs written by the team for the Supremes to not reach number 1, peaking at number 5 on the US pop chart for two weeks in February 1966 and at number 10 on the R&B chart; the single failed to chart on the UK Singles Chart. The group performed the song on the CBS hit variety program The Ed Sullivan Show on Sunday, February 20, 1966.

Billboard described the song as being "right in their pulsating rhythm groove of 'I Hear a Symphony' with even more excitement in the performance". Cash Box described it as a "throbbing, rhythmic soulful tearjerker about a love-sick girl who spends her days carrying the torch for her ex-boyfriend".

In the view of pop historian Andrew Grant Jackson, the Rolling Stones' later song "Paint It Black" bears a strong resemblance to "My World Is Empty Without You".

== Personnel ==
- Lead vocals by Diana Ross
- Background vocals by Mary Wilson and Florence Ballard
- Instrumentation by the Funk Brothers and the Detroit Symphony Orchestra:
  - Earl Van Dyke – organ
  - James Gittens – piano
  - James Jamerson – bass
  - Benny Benjamin – drums
  - Joe Messina – guitar
  - Jack Ashford – vibraphone
  - Mike Terry – baritone saxophone
  - Paul Riser – string arrangements

== Charts ==
=== Weekly charts ===
| Chart (1965–1966) | Peak position |
|---|---|
| Australia (Kent Music Report) | 88 |
| Canada (Billboard) | 1 |
| Canada Top Singles (RPM) | 29 |
| Singapore (Billboard) | 7 |
| US Billboard Hot 100 | 5 |
| US Hot R&B/Hip-Hop Songs (Billboard) | 10 |
| US Cashbox Top 100 | 5 |
| US Cashbox R&B | 7 |
| US Record World 100 Top Pops | 4 |
| US Record World Top 40 R&B | 12 |

=== Year-end charts ===
| Chart (1966) | Rank |
|---|---|
| US Billboard Hot 100 | 72 |
| US Cashbox Top 100 | 55 |

== Certifications ==
| Region | Certification | Certified units/sales |
|---|---|---|
| United States | — | 1,000,000 |
