= More Hits by The Supremes =

Studio album by the Supremes
- Released: July 23, 1965
- Recorded: 1964–1965
- Studios: Hitsville U.S.A., Detroit
- Genres: Pop; soul; R&B
- Length: 32:37
- Labels: Motown; MT 627
- Producers: Brian Holland; Lamont Dozier

The Supremes chronology
We Remember Sam Cooke (1965)	More Hits by The Supremes (1965)	The Supremes at the Copa (1965)

Singles from More Hits by The Supremes
- 1. "Stop! In the Name of Love" Released: February 8, 1965; 2. "Back in My Arms Again" Released: April 15, 1965; 3. "Nothing but Heartaches" Released: July 16, 1965

Professional ratings
Review scores
Source	Rating
AllMusic	4.5/5 stars
The Encyclopedia of Popular Music	3/5 stars

More Hits by The Supremes is the sixth studio album by Motown singing group the Supremes, released in 1965. The album includes two number-one hits: "Stop! In the Name of Love" and "Back in My Arms Again", as well as the Top 20 single "Nothing but Heartaches".

Barney Ales, then an executive vice-president of Motown Records, reported in the August 14, 1965 issue of Billboard magazine the album had advance orders estimated at 300,000. More Hits by The Supremes peaked at number six on the U.S. Billboard Top LPs album chart and remained on that chart for 37 weeks. It reached number two on Billboard's R&B album chart. To further underscore their popularity, each girl's signature was autographed on the album cover.

The opening track was to have been "Always In My Heart," the back side of "Come See About Me," but then "Ask Any Girl" was remixed as a possible A-side single and the remix opened this album. "Always In My Heart" surfaced later as "You're Gone (But Always In My Heart)" on the "Supremes Sing Holland-Dozier-Holland" album (at the suggestion of a fan!). The problem with the title "Always In My Heart" was the royalties were being misreported to the standard tune "Always In My Heart."

"Mother Dear" originally was to follow-up "Back In My Arms Again," however Motown decided the follow-up should be a similar vibe and chose "Nothing But Heartaches" instead as the single. When "Heartaches" missed making number one, it caused the label to seek another musical direction for the next single. "Mother Dear" was rearranged with a stop beat and re-recorded but again rejected for single release.

The songs were all released in stereo mixes on the stereo version of the vinyl album except "He Holds His Own," which remained unreleased until the 2011 expanded edition.

== Track listing ==
All songs written by Holland–Dozier–Holland and produced by Brian Holland and Lamont Dozier.

=== Side one ===
1. "Ask Any Girl" – 2:46
2. "Nothing but Heartaches" – 2:58
3. "Mother Dear" – 2:45
4. "Stop! In the Name of Love" – 2:53
5. "Honey Boy" – 2:35
6. "Back in My Arms Again" – 2:55

=== Side two ===
1. "Whisper You Love Me Boy" – 2:38
2. "The Only Time I'm Happy" – 2:33
3. "He Holds His Own" – 2:31
4. "Who Could Ever Doubt My Love" – 2:42
5. "(I'm So Glad) Heartaches Don't Last Always" – 2:57
6. "I'm in Love Again" – 2:22

=== 2011 expanded edition tracks ===
1. "Baby Love" (Live at the Fox, Detroit 1964)
2. "Where Did Our Love Go" (Live at the Fox, Detroit 1964)
3. "Come See About Me" (Live at the Fox, Detroit 1964)
4. "Come Into My Palace" (Hunter, Moore, Holland)
5. "Ooowee Baby" (Robinson)
6. "Come On Boy" (Berry Gordy, Jr.)
7. "Beach Ball" (Holland-Dozier-Holland)
8. "Stop! In the Name of Love" (Version 1) (Holland-Dozier-Holland)
9. "Take Me Where You Go" (Version 1 without strings) (Robinson)
10. "Back in My Arms Again" (Alternate Vocal) (Holland-Dozier-Holland)
11. "Too Hurt to Cry, Too Much in Love to Say Goodbye" (Holland-Dozier-Holland)
12. "Whisper You Love Me Boy" (Alternate Vocal) (Holland-Dozier-Holland)
13. "Nothing But Heartaches" (Alternate Vocal) (Holland-Dozier-Holland)
14. "It's All Your Fault" (Version 2) (Holland-Dozier-Holland)
15. "Mother Dear" (Version 2) (Holland-Dozier-Holland)
16. "Too Much a Little Too Soon" (Robinson-Rogers-Tarplin-Moore)
17. "He Holds His Own" (Alternate Vocal) (Holland-Dozier-Holland)
18. "Moonlight and Kisses" (German recording)
19. "Baby Baby Wo Ist Unsere Liebe (Where Did Our Love Go)" (German recording)
20. "Thank You Darling, Thank You Baby" (German recording)
21. "Jonny Und Joe (Come See About Me)" (German recording)
22. "Stop! In the Name of Love" (Live in Paris, 1965)
23. "Baby Love" (Live in Paris, 1965)
24. "Somewhere" (Live in Paris, 1965)
25. "You're Nobody Till Somebody Loves You" (Live in Paris, 1965)
26. "Shake" (Live in Paris, 1965)

=== Unused recordings from the More Hits timeframe ===
1. "Come Into My Palace" (Stevenson-Moore-Holland)
2. "Ooowee Baby" (Robinson)
3. "Take Me Where You Go" (Robinson-Moore)
4. "Too Hurt to Cry, Too Much in Love to Say Goodbye" (Holland-Dozier-Holland)
5. "Surfer Boy" (Holland-Dozier-Holland)
6. "Beach Ball" (Holland-Dozier-Holland)
7. "Too Much a Little Too Soon" (Robinson-Rogers-Tarplin-Moore)
8. "It's All Your Fault" (Holland-Dozier-Holland)
9. "Moonlight and Kisses" (Busch-Werner-Scharfenberger)
10. "Thank You Darling, Thank You Baby" (Holland-Dozier-Holland)
11. "Baby Baby, Wo Ist Unsere Liebe" (Holland-Dozier-Holland)
12. "Jonny Und Joe" (Holland-Dozier-Holland)

== Personnel ==
- Diana Ross – lead vocals
- Mary Wilson – background vocals
- Florence Ballard – background vocals
- The Andantes – additional background vocals on "Stop! In the Name of Love"
- Brian Holland, Lamont Dozier – producers
- Instrumentation by the Funk Brothers:
  - Johnny Griffith – organ on "Stop! In the Name of Love"
  - Earl Van Dyke – piano on "Back in My Arms Again"
  - Joe Messina – guitar on "Stop! In the Name of Love" and "Back in My Arms Again"
  - James Jamerson – bass on "Stop! In the Name of Love" and "Back in My Arms Again"
  - Benny Benjamin – drums on "Stop! In the Name of Love" and "Back in My Arms Again"
  - Jack Ashford – vibraphone on "Stop! In the Name of Love"
  - James Gittens – piano on "Stop! In the Name of Love", vibraphone on "Back in My Arms Again"
  - Mike Terry – baritone saxophone on "Stop! In the Name of Love" and "Back in My Arms Again"
  - Mike Valvano – percussion on "Stop! In the Name of Love" and "Back in My Arms Again"
- The Detroit Symphony Orchestra – instrumentation
- Bernard Yeszin – cover design

== Charts ==
=== Weekly charts ===
Chart (1965–1966)	Peak position
UK R&B Albums (Record Mirror)	7
US Billboard 200	6
US Top R&B/Hip-Hop Albums (Billboard)	2

=== Year-end charts ===
Chart (1965)	Rank
US Cashbox Top 100	98

=== Decade-end charts ===
Chart (1960-69)	Rank
UK Audio Streaming (Official Charts Company)	18
