= The Happening (song) =

- Side A of the Canadian single

Single by The Supremes

from the album Greatest Hits
- B-side: "All I Know About You"
- Released: March 20, 1967
- Recorded: March 2, 1967
- Studio: Hitsville U.S.A. (Studio A)
- Genre: Pop
- Length: 2:52 (album/single version); 3:44 (extended hit mix)
- Label: Motown; M 1107
- Songwriter: Holland–Dozier–Holland–DeVol
- Producers: Brian Holland; Lamont Dozier

The Supremes singles chronology
"Love Is Here and Now You're Gone" (1967)	"The Happening" (1967)	"Reflections" (1967)

Audio sample
- "The Happening": file; help

"The Happening" is a 1967 song recorded by Motown artists The Supremes. It served as the theme song of the 1967 Columbia Pictures film The Happening, and was released as a single by Motown at the time of the film's release that spring. While the movie flopped, the song peaked at number 1 on the Billboard Hot 100 pop singles chart in May, becoming The Supremes' tenth number 1 single in the United States, peaking in the top 10 on the UK Singles Chart at number 6, and in the top 5 in the Australian Pop Chart and in the Dutch Pop Chart.

== History ==
Produced by Brian Holland and Lamont Dozier, and written by Holland–Dozier–Holland and Frank De Vol (The Happening's musical director), "The Happening" was the final single issued by The Supremes under that name. Between the release of "The Happening" and the next Supremes single, "Reflections," the group's billing changed to Diana Ross & the Supremes, and Florence Ballard was replaced with Cindy Birdsong of Patti LaBelle & the Blue Belles.

It has been widely believed, and reported that the instrumental track was recorded in Los Angeles using members of the Wrecking Crew, particularly drummer Hal Blaine. The song was authored by Los Angeles–based writer Frank DeVol, and sessions for the single were cut in a Los Angeles studio. Two reports suggest all or part of the final released single was recorded in Detroit. Supremes biographer Mark Ribowsky wrote in 2008 that "early tracks [were laid down] in L.A." but "couldn't catch the groove . . .needing a stronger, funkier bottom and backbeat." Ribowsky maintains that "they started all over again in Studio A in March [1967]." However, Chris Jisi, writing in 2009, notes the track was cut in Los Angeles but was sent back to re-record the bass line with Motown regular James Jamerson, and the final version contained at minimum his contribution.

Ballard's final of the 17 appearances The Supremes made on the hit CBS variety television program The Ed Sullivan Show was on an episode where she performed this song live from Expo 67 in Montréal on Sunday, May 7, 1967, going to number 1 the same week.

Billboard described the single as being "in the good-time rhythm music bag" as "the trio changes pace with this classy performance of the new film theme." Cash Box called the single a "light, bouncy, up-tempo, romp" that is a "sure fire chart topper." Record World described it as "a bright, bouncy, lively number about the fickle finger of fate and love."

== Personnel ==
- Lead vocals by Diana Ross
- Background vocals by Florence Ballard and Mary Wilson
- Instrumentation by the Funk Brothers and/or the Wrecking Crew (see above)
  - James Jamerson – bass

== Charts ==
=== Weekly charts ===
Chart (1967)	Peak position
Australia (Billboard)	3
Australia (Go-Set)	7
Australia (Kent Music Report)	5
Belgium (Ultratop 50 Wallonia)	46
Canada Top Singles (RPM)	2
Holland (Billboard)	6
Holland (Cash Box)	4
Ireland (IRMA)	10
Malaysia (Billboard)	7
Netherlands (Dutch Top 40)	5
Netherlands (Single Top 100)	5
New Zealand (Listener)	14
Sweden (Kvällstoppen)	12
Switzerland (Billboard)	9
UK Singles (Official Charts)	6
UK R&B (Record Mirror)	2
US Billboard Hot 100	1
US Hot R&B/Hip-Hop Songs (Billboard)	12
US Cash Box Top 100	1
US Record World 100 Top Pops	1
US Record World Top 50 R&B	15

=== Year-end charts ===
Chart (1967)	Rank
Australia (Kent Music Report)	47
Canada Top Singles (RPM)	44
Japan Foreign Hits (Billboard)	5
Netherlands (Dutch Top 40)	61
UK Singles (OCC)	51
US Billboard Hot 100	29
US Cash Box Top 100	23

== Certifications ==
Region	Certification	Certified units/sales
United States	—	1,000,000

== Other versions ==
"The Happening" was an instrumental hit for Herb Alpert & the Tijuana Brass in 1967 making number 32 on the Billboard chart.

There is a Spanish version of the song recorded by the Spanish group Greta y los Garbo in 1990 entitled ¡Menuda fiesta! The song is included in an album of the same name and It was a huge commercial success in Spain.

The Swedish singer Siw Malmkvist recorded a Swedish cover named "En Hipp Häpp Happening" September 1967

== See also ==
- List of Hot 100 number-one singles of 1967 (U.S.)
