= The Supremes timeline =

US singing group

The Supremes were an American singing group from Detroit, Michigan, who recorded for Motown Records as their premier act. The original lineup included Diana Ross, Mary Wilson and Florence Ballard. This is a chronology overview of the Supremes history.

Contents
1930s · 1940s · 1950s · 1960 · 1961 · 1962 · 1963 · 1964 · 1965 · 1966 · 1967 · 1968 · 1969 · 1970s · 1980s · 1990s · 2000s · 2010s · 2020s
See also · References

== Legend ==
Type codes
T	Event type
G	Changes to group lineup/name
L	Life events including births, deaths, weddings, and divorces
PA	Performance: audition
PC	Performance: concert
PR	Performance: radio broadcast
PT	Performance: TV broadcast
RA	Release: album
RE	Release: EP
RF	Release: film or video
RS	Release: single
M	Music
MR	Music for radio
V	Video (film, TV)
O	Other events

Location codes
Event location	L
Germany	GER
Italy	ITA
Japan	JAP
United Kingdom	UK
United States	US
Other	O

== 1930s ==
Date	T	Event	L
15 Dec 1939	L	Cindy Birdsong is born in Mount Holly Township, New Jersey.	US

== 1940s ==
Date	T	Event	L
30 Jun 1941	L	Betty McGlown is born in Detroit, Michigan.	US
16 Jun 1943	L	Barbara Martin is born in Detroit.	US
30 Jun 1943	L	Florence Ballard is born in Detroit.	US
06 Mar 1944	L	Mary Wilson is born in Greenville, Mississippi.	US
26 Mar 1944	L	Diana Ross is born in Detroit.	US
04 Nov 1944	L	Scherrie Payne is born in Detroit.	US
26 Nov 1944	L	Jean Terrell is born in Belzoni, Mississippi.	US
20 Feb 1949	L	Lynda Laurence (née Tucker) is born in Philadelphia, Pennsylvania.	US
13 Sep 1949	L	Susaye Greene is born in Houston, Texas.	US

== 1950s ==
Date	T	Event	L
1959	G	The Primettes form in Detroit. The lineup includes Florence Ballard, Mary Wilson, Diana Ross and Betty McGlown.	US

== 1960 ==
Date	T	Event	L
Aug 1960	RS	"Tears of Sorrow" / "Pretty Baby" released by The Primettes on Lu Pine Records.	US
1960	G	Betty McGlown is replaced by Barbara Martin.	US

== 1961 ==
Date	T	Event	L
01 Jan 1961	G	The Primettes are signed by Motown Records, and change their name to The Supremes.	US
15 Jan 1961	G	The Supremes sign to Motown.	US
09 Mar 1961	RS	"I Want a Guy" / "Never Again" released.	US
21 Jul 1961	RS	"Buttered Popcorn" / "Who's Lovin' You" released.	US

== 1962 ==
Date	T	Event	L
1962	G	Barbara Martin leaves the group, who continue on as a trio.	US
08 May 1962	RS	"Your Heart Belongs to Me" / "(He's) Seventeen" released.	US
05 Nov 1962	RS	"Let Me Go the Right Way" / "Time Changes Things" released.	US
09 Dec 1962	RA	Meet The Supremes released.	US

== 1963 ==
Date	T	Event	L
02 Feb 1963	RS	"My Heart Can't Take It No More" / "You Bring Back Memories" released.	US
12 Jun 1963	RS	"A Breath Taking Guy" / "(The Man with the) Rock and Roll Banjo Band" released.	US
31 Oct 1963	RS	"When the Lovelight Starts Shining Through His Eyes" / "Standing at the Crossroads of Love" released.	US
Dec 1963	RA	The Supremes Sing Ballads & Blues planned release cancelled.	US

== 1964 ==
Date	T	Event	L
07 Feb 1964	RS	"Run, Run, Run" / "I'm Giving You Your Freedom" released.	US
17 Jun 1964	RS	"Where Did Our Love Go" / "He Means the World to Me" released.	US
31 Aug 1964	RA	Where Did Our Love Go released.	US
17 Sep 1964	RS	"Baby Love" / "Ask Any Girl" released.	US
16 Oct 1964	RA	A Bit of Liverpool released.	US
27 Oct 1964	RS	"Come See About Me" / "(You're Gone, But) Always in My Heart" released.	US

== 1965 ==
Date	T	Event	L
08 Feb 1965	RS	"Stop! In the Name of Love" / "I'm in Love Again" released.	US
22 Feb 1965	RA	The Supremes Sing Country, Western and Pop released.	US
Mar 1965	RA	Live! Live! Live! planned release cancelled.	US
12 Apr 1965	RA	We Remember Sam Cooke released.	US
15 Apr 1965	RS	"Back in My Arms Again" / "Whisper You Love Me Boy" released.	US
May 1965	RS	"Moonlight and Kisses" / "Baby, Baby, Wo Ist Unsere Liebe" ("Where Did Our Love Go") released.	GER
Jun 1965	RS	"The Only Time I'm Happy" / Supremes Interview - promotional disc released.	US
16 Jul 1965	RS	"Mother Dear" / "He Holds His Own" planned release cancelled.	US
16 Jul 1965	RS	"Nothing but Heartaches" / "He Holds His Own" released.	US
23 Jul 1965	RA	More Hits by The Supremes released.	US
13 Aug 1965	MR	"Things Are Changing" / "Things Are Changing" radio promotional single released.	US
Sep 1965	RA	There's a Place for Us planned release cancelled.	US
06 Oct 1965	RS	"Mother Dear" / "Who Could Ever Doubt My Love" planned release cancelled.	US
06 Oct 1965	RS	"I Hear a Symphony" / "Who Could Ever Doubt My Love" released.	US
Oct 1965	RS	"Thank You Darling, Thank You Baby" / "Jonny und Joe" ("Come See About Me") released.	GER
Oct 1965	RA	Around the World with The Supremes planned release cancelled.	US
01 Nov 1965	RA	The Supremes at the Copa released.	US
01 Nov 1965	RA	Merry Christmas released.	US
18 Nov 1965	RS	"Children's Christmas Song" / "Twinkle, Twinkle, Little Me" released.	US
Dec 1965	RA	A Tribute to the Girls planned release cancelled.	US
29 Dec 1965	RS	"My World Is Empty Without You" / "Everything Is Good About You" released.	US

== 1966 ==
Date	T	Event	L
18 Feb 1966	RA	I Hear a Symphony released.	US
08 Apr 1966	RS	"Love Is Like an Itching in My Heart" / "He's All I Got" released.	US
May 1966	RA	Pure Gold planned release cancelled.	US
25 Jul 1966	RS	"You Can't Hurry Love" / "Put Yourself in My Place" released.	US
25 Aug 1966	RA	The Supremes A' Go-Go released.	US
12 Oct 1966	RS	"You Keep Me Hangin' On" / "Mother You, Smother You" planned release cancelled.	US
12 Oct 1966	RS	"You Keep Me Hangin' On" / "Remove This Doubt" released.	US

== 1967 ==
Date	T	Event	L
11 Jan 1967	RS	"Love Is Here and Now You're Gone" / "There's No Stopping Us Now" released.	US
23 Jan 1967	RA	The Supremes Sing Holland–Dozier–Holland released.	US
20 Mar 1967	RS	"The Happening" / "All I Know About You" released.	US
03 Apr 1967	RS	"L'Amore Verra'" ("You Can't Hurry Love") / "Se Il Filo Spezzerai" ("You Keep Me Hangin' On") released. (Italy)	ITA
Apr 1967	RA	The Supremes and the Motown Sound: From Broadway to Hollywood planned release cancelled.	US
22 May 1967	RA	The Supremes Sing Rodgers & Hart released.	US
28 Jun 1967	G	The Supremes are renamed Diana Ross & the Supremes.	US
01 Jul 1967	G	Florence Ballard is dismissed from The Supremes and replaced by Cindy Birdsong.	US
24 Jul 1967	RS	"Reflections" / "Going Down for the Third Time" released.	US
29 Aug 1967	RA	Greatest Hits released.	US
25 Oct 1967	RS	"In and Out of Love" / "I Guess I'll Always Love You" released.	US
Dec 1967	RA	Diana Ross & the Supremes Sing Disney Classics planned release cancelled.	US

== 1968 ==
Date	T	Event	L
29 Feb 1968	RS	"Forever Came Today" / "Time Changes Things" released.	US
25 Mar 1968	RA	Reflections released.	US
Apr 1968	RS	"What the World Needs Now Is Love" / "Your Kiss of Fire" planned release cancelled.	US
21 May 1968	RS	"Some Things You Never Get Used To" / "You've Been So Wonderful to Me" released.	US
26 Aug 1968	RA	Live at London's Talk of the Town released.	US
26 Aug 1968	RA	Diana Ross & the Supremes Sing and Perform "Funny Girl" released.	US
30 Sep 1968	RS	"Love Child" / "Will This Be the Day" released.	US
08 Nov 1968	RA	Diana Ross & the Supremes Join The Temptations released.	US
13 Nov 1968	RA	Love Child released.	US
21 Nov 1968	RS	"The Impossible Dream" / "A Place in the Sun" planned release cancelled.	US
21 Nov 1968	RS	"I'm Gonna Make You Love Me" / "A Place in the Sun" released.	US
02 Dec 1968	PT	TCB appearance.	US

== 1969 ==
Date	T	Event	L
06 Jan 1969	RS	"I'm Livin' in Shame" / "I'm So Glad I Got Somebody (Like You Around)" released.	US
20 Feb 1969	RS	"I'll Try Something New" / "The Way You Do the Things You Do" released.	US
27 Mar 1969	RS	"The Composer" / "The Beginning of The End" released.	US
09 May 1969	RS	"No Matter What Sign You Are" / "The Young Folks" released.	US
26 May 1969	RA	Let the Sunshine In released.	US
Aug 1969	RS	"Stubborn Kind of Fellow" / "Try It Baby" planned release cancelled.	US
21 Aug 1969	RS	"The Weight" / "For Better or Worse" released.	US
Sep 1969	RS	"I Second That Emotion" / "The Way You Do the Things You Do" released.	UK
23 Sep 1969	RA	Together released.	US
14 Oct 1969	RS	"Someday We'll Be Together" / "He's My Sunny Boy" released.	US
03 Nov 1969	RA	Cream of the Crop released.	US
07 Nov 1969	RA	G.I.T. on Broadway released.	US
18 Dec 1969	RA	Greatest Hits Vol. 3 released.	US

== 1970s ==
Date	T	Event	L
14 Jan 1970	G	Diana Ross & the Supremes perform together for the last time. After the performance, Diana Ross leaves The Supremes to go solo and is replaced by Jean Terrell. The group name then goes back to The Supremes.	US
16 Feb 1970	RS	"Life Beats" / "Bill, When Are You Coming Back" planned release cancelled.	US
16 Feb 1970	RS	"Up the Ladder to the Roof" / "Bill, When Are You Coming Back" released.	US
Mar 1970	RS	"Why (Must We Fall in Love)" / "Uptight (Everything's Alright)" released (as by Diana Ross & the Supremes).	UK
13 Apr 1970	RA	Farewell released.	US
26 Apr 1970	RA	Right On released.	US
25 Jun 1970	RS	"Everybody's Got the Right to Love" / "But I Love You More" released.	US
Sep 1970	RA	The Magnificent 7 released.	US
Oct 1970	RA	New Ways but Love Stays released.	US
15 Oct 1970	RS	"Stoned Love" / "Shine on Me" released.	US
05 Nov 1970	RS	"River Deep – Mountain High" / "Together We Can Make Such Sweet Music" released.	US
15 Apr 1971	RS	"Nathan Jones" / "Happy (Is a Bumpy Road)" released.	US
11 May 1971	RS	"You Gotta Have Love in Your Heart" / "I'm Glad About It" released.	US
Jun 1971	RS	"River Deep – Mountain High" / "It's Got to Be a Miracle (This Thing Called Love)" released.	UK
Jun 1971	RA	The Return of the Magnificent Seven released.	US
Jun 1971	RA	Touch released.	US
07 Sep 1971	RS	"Touch" / "It's So Hard for Me to Say Good-bye" released.	US
01 Dec 1971	RS	"Floy Joy" / "This Is the Story" released.	US
Dec 1971	RA	Dynamite! released.	US
Dec 1971	RA	Promises Kept planned release cancelled.	US
Apr 1972	G	Cindy Birdsong leaves The Supremes and is replaced by Lynda Laurence.	US
11 Apr 1972	RS	"Automatically Sunshine" / "Precious Little Things" released.	US
May 1972	RA	Floy Joy released.	US
May 1972	RS	"Without the One You Love" / "Let's Make Love Now" released.	UK
11 Jul 1972	RS	"Your Wonderful, Sweet Sweet Love" / "The Wisdom of Time" released.	US
15 Sep 1972	RS	"I Guess I'll Miss the Man" / "Over and Over" released.	US
Nov 1972	RS	"Your Wonderful, Sweet Sweet Love" / "Love It Came to Me This Time" released.	UK
Nov 1972	RS	"Reach Out and Touch (Somebody's Hand)" / "Where Would I Be Without You Baby" released.	UK
Nov 1972	RA	The Supremes Produced and Arranged by Jimmy Webb released.	US
22 Mar 1973	RS	"Bad Weather" / "Oh Be My Love" released.	US
Mar 1973	RS	"Bad Weather" / "It's So Hard for Me to Say Good-bye" released.	UK
1973	RA	The Supremes Live! In Japan released.	JAP
Sep 1973	RS	"Tossin' and Turnin'" / "Oh Be My Love" released.	UK
Oct 1973	G	Lynda Laurence leaves The Supremes and is replaced by Cindy Birdsong, who had replaced her. Also, Jean Terrell leaves The Supremes and is replaced by Scherrie Payne.	US
May 1974	RA	Diana Ross & the Supremes Anthology (version one) released.	US
Aug 1974	RS	"Baby Love" / "Ask Any Girl" re-released.	UK
Nov 1974	RS	"Where Did Our Love Go" / "Nothing but Heartaches" released.	UK
May 1975	RA	The Supremes released.	US
12 Jun 1975	RS	"It's All Been Said Before" / "Give Out, But Don't Give Up" planned release cancelled.	US
12 Jun 1975	RS	"He's My Man" / "Give Out, But Don't Give Up" released.	US
05 Sep 1975	RS	"Where Do I Go from Here" / "Give Out, But Don't Give Up" released.	US
Nov 1975	RS	"Early Morning Love" / "Where Is It I Belong" released.	UK
Feb 1976	G	Cindy Birdsong leaves The Supremes again and is replaced by Susaye Greene.	US
22 Feb 1976	L	Florence Ballard dies of coronary thrombosis, in Detroit, Michigan.	US
16 Mar 1976	RS	"I'm Gonna Let My Heart Do the Walking" / "Early Morning Love" released.	US
Apr 1976	RA	High Energy released.	US
Apr 1976	RS	"High Energy" / "High Energy" released.	US
May 1976	RS	"I'm Gonna Let My Heart Do the Walking" / "Colour My World Blue" released.	UK
Sep 1976	RS	"Baby Love" / "Stop! In the Name of Love" released.	UK
Sep 1976	RS	"Stoned Love" / "Nathan Jones" released.	UK
30 Sep 1976	RS	"You're My Driving Wheel" / "You're What's Missing in My Life" released.	US
Oct 1976	RA	Mary, Scherrie & Susaye released.	US
25 Jan 1977	RS	"Let Yourself Go" / "You Are the Heart of Me" released.	US
Mar 1977	RS	"Love, I Never Knew You Could Feel So Good" / "This Is Why I Believe in You" released.	US
12 Jun 1977	PC	The Supremes perform their farewell concert in London and disband.	UK
Aug 1977	RS	"Someday We'll Be Together" / "You Keep Me Hangin' On" released.	UK
Sep 1977	RA	20 Golden Greats released.	UK
30 Jun 1978	RA	At Their Best released.	US

== 1980s ==
Date	T	Event	L
Apr 1980	RS	"Supremes Medley (Part 1)" / "Supremes Medley (Part 2)" released.	UK
Sep 1980	RS	"You Can't Hurry Love" / "The Happening" released.	UK
Sep 1980	RS	"Reflections" / "Love Child" released.	UK
Sep 1980	RS	"Up the Ladder to the Roof" / "Automatically Sunshine" released.	UK
Sep 1980	RS	"River Deep – Mountain High" / "You Gotta Have Love in Your Heart" released.	UK
Sep 1980	RS	"Floy Joy" / "Bad Weather" released.	UK
Feb 1983	RS	"Back In My Arms Again" / "Love Is Here and Now You're Gone" released.	UK
Jul 1984	RS	"Reach Out and Touch (Somebody's Hand)" / "Reach Out and Touch (Somebody's Hand)" released.	UK
Apr 1985	RS	"I'm Gonna Make You Love Me" / "I Second That Emotion" released.	UK
Apr 1985	RS	"You Keep Me Hangin' On" / "Come See About Me" released.	UK
Apr 1985	RS	"The Composer" / "Take Me Where You Go" released.	UK
1985	RA	Diana Ross & the Supremes: 25th Anniversary Collection released.	US
1986	RA	Diana Ross & the Supremes Anthology (version two) released.	US
01 Jul 1987	RA	The Never-Before-Released Masters released.	US
Dec 1988	RA	Love Supreme released.	UK
Jan 1989	RS	"Stop! In the Name of Love" / "Automatically Sunshine" released.	UK

== 1990s ==
Date	T	Event	L
1991	RA	The Supremes ('70s): Greatest Hits and Rare Classics released.	US
1995	RA	The Best of Diana Ross & the Supremes: Anthology (version three) released.	US
07 Oct 1997	RA	The Ultimate Collection released.	US
Oct 1998	RA	40 Golden Motown Greats released.	UK

== 2000s ==
Date	T	Event	L
29 Aug 2000	RA	The Supremes released.	US
2000	RA	20th Century Masters: The Best of Diana Ross & the Supremes, Vol. 1 released.	US
2000	RA	20th Century Masters: The Best of Diana Ross & the Supremes, Vol. 2 released.	US
2001	RA	Diana Ross & the Supremes Anthology (version four) released.	US
29 Oct 2002	RA	The '70s Anthology released.	US
21 Oct 2003	RA	Diana Ross & the Supremes: The No. 1's released.	US
2004	RA	Joined Together: The Complete Studio Duets released.	US
09 Jul 2004	RA	There's a Place for Us released.	US
2005	RA	The Supremes Gold released.	US
12 Dec 2006	RA	This Is the Story: The '70s Albums, Vol. 1 – 1970–1973: The Jean Terrell Years released.	US
2007	RA	Diana Ross & the Supremes Remixes released.	US
12 Jan 2008	L	Betty McGlown dies at Royal Oak, Oakland County, Michigan.	US
25 Mar 2008	RA	Let the Music Play: Supreme Rarities released.	US
28 Sep 2008	RA	The Definitive Collection released.	US
2009	RA	Magnificent: The Complete Studio Duets released.	US

== 2010s ==
Date	T	Event	L
31 Aug 2010	RA	Icon: Diana Ross & the Supremes released.	US
17 May 2011	RA	Let Yourself Go: The '70s Albums, Vol 2 – 1974–1977: The Final Sessions released.	US
24 Oct 2011	RA	50th Anniversary: The Singles Collection 1961–1969 released.	US

== 2020s ==
Date	T	Event	L
04 Mar 2020	L	Barbara Martin dies in Detroit, Michigan.	US
08 Feb 2021	L	Mary Wilson dies in Henderson, Nevada.	US

== See also ==
- The Supremes discography
