= 50th Anniversary: The Singles Collection 1961–1969 =

Box set by The Supremes
- Released: October 24, 2011
- Recorded: 1961–1969
- Genres: Pop, R&B
- Length: 228:12
- Labels: Motown, Hip-O Select

The Supremes chronology
Let Yourself Go: The '70s Albums, Vol 2 – 1974–1977: The Final Sessions (2011)	50th Anniversary: The Singles Collection 1961–1969 (2011)	The Ultimate Merry Christmas (2017)

Professional ratings
Review scores
Source	Rating
Allmusic	4/5 stars

Diana Ross & the Supremes – 50th Anniversary: The Singles Collection 1961–1969 is a three disc box set consisting of The Supremes' original-released singles as released by Motown from 1961 to 1969.

== Track listing ==
Disc 1 (all tracks shown as The Supremes)
No.	Title	Writer(s)	Producer(s)	Length
1.	"I Want a Guy"	Berry Gordy, Brian Holland, Freddie Gorman	Berry Gordy	3:05
2.	"Never Again"	Berry Gordy	Berry Gordy	3:02
3.	"Buttered Popcorn" (first version)	Berry Gordy, Barney Ales	Berry Gordy	2:56
4.	"Who's Lovin' You"	Smokey Robinson	Berry Gordy	2:50
5.	"Buttered Popcorn" (second version)	Berry Gordy, Barney Ales	Berry Gordy	2:32
6.	"Your Heart Belongs to Me" (first version)	Smokey Robinson	Smokey Robinson	2:36
7.	"(He's) Seventeen"	Marv Johnson, Raynoma Liles Gordy	Raynoma Liles Gordy	2:40
8.	"Your Heart Belongs to Me" (second version)	Smokey Robinson	Smokey Robinson	2:36
9.	"Let Me Go the Right Way"	Berry Gordy	Berry Gordy	2:33
10.	"Time Changes Things"	Brian Holland, Janie Bradford, Lamont Dozier	Brian Holland, Lamont Dozier	2:27
11.	"My Heart Can't Take It No More"	Clarence Paul	Clarence Paul	2:58
12.	"You Bring Back Memories"	Smokey Robinson	Smokey Robinson	2:37
13.	"A Breath Taking Guy"	Smokey Robinson	Smokey Robinson	2:25
14.	"(The Man with the) Rock and Roll Banjo Band"	Clarence Paul, Berry Gordy	Clarence Paul	3:04
15.	"When the Lovelight Starts Shining Through His Eyes"	Holland–Dozier–Holland	Brian Holland, Lamont Dozier	3:06
16.	"Standing at the Crossroads of Love"	Holland–Dozier–Holland	Brian Holland, Lamont Dozier	2:30
17.	"Run, Run, Run"	Holland–Dozier–Holland	Brian Holland, Lamont Dozier	2:22
18.	"I'm Giving You Your Freedom"	Holland–Dozier–Holland	Brian Holland, Lamont Dozier	2:34
19.	"Where Did Our Love Go"	Holland–Dozier–Holland	Brian Holland, Lamont Dozier	2:33
20.	"He Means the World to Me"	Norman Whitfield	Norman Whitfield	1:51
21.	"Baby Love"	Holland–Dozier–Holland	Brian Holland, Lamont Dozier	2:36
22.	"Ask Any Girl"	Holland–Dozier–Holland	Brian Holland, Lamont Dozier	3:02
23.	"Come See About Me"	Holland–Dozier–Holland	Brian Holland, Lamont Dozier	2:41
24.	"You're Gone (But Always in My Heart)"	Holland–Dozier–Holland	Brian Holland, Lamont Dozier	2:27
25.	"Moonlight and Kisses"	Werner Scharfenber	Marc Gordon, Hal Davis, Berry Gordy	2:44
26.	"Baby, Baby, Wo Ist Unsere Liebe (Where Did Our Love Go)"	Holland–Dozier–Holland	Brian Holland, Lamont Dozier	2:39
27.	"Thank You Darling"	Werner Scharfenber	Marc Gordon, Hal Davis, Berry Gordy	2:44
28.	"Jonny Und Joe (Come See About Me)"	Holland–Dozier–Holland	Brian Holland, Lamont Dozier	2:38

Disc 2 (all tracks shown as The Supremes)
No.	Title	Writer(s)	Producer(s)	Length
1.	"Stop! In the Name of Love"	Holland–Dozier–Holland	Brian Holland, Lamont Dozier	2:53
2.	"I'm in Love Again"	Holland–Dozier–Holland	Brian Holland, Lamont Dozier	2:20
3.	"Back in My Arms Again"	Holland–Dozier–Holland	Brian Holland, Lamont Dozier	2:57
4.	"Whisper You Love Me Boy"	Holland–Dozier–Holland	Brian Holland, Lamont Dozier	2:40
5.	"The Only Time I'm Happy"	Holland–Dozier–Holland	Brian Holland, Lamont Dozier	2:29
6.	"Nothing but Heartaches"	Holland–Dozier–Holland	Brian Holland, Lamont Dozier	2:43
7.	"He Holds His Own"	Holland–Dozier–Holland	Brian Holland, Lamont Dozier	2:31
8.	"Things Are Changing"	Phil Spector	Jerry Riopelle	2:58
9.	"Dr. Goldfoot and the Bikini Machine"	Guy Hemrick, Jerry Styner	Al Simms	2:23
10.	"I Hear a Symphony"	Holland–Dozier–Holland	Brian Holland, Lamont Dozier	2:42
11.	"Who Could Ever Doubt My Love"	Holland–Dozier–Holland	Brian Holland, Lamont Dozier	2:36
12.	"Children's Christmas Song"	Isabelle Freeman, Harvey Fuqua	Harvey Fuqua	2:46
13.	"Twinkle Twinkle Little Me"	Ronald Miller, William O'Malley	Harvey Fuqua	3:03
14.	"My World Is Empty Without You"	Holland–Dozier–Holland	Brian Holland, Lamont Dozier	2:35
15.	"Everything Is Good About You"	James Dean, Eddie Holland	Brian Holland, Lamont Dozier	3:12
16.	"Love Is Like an Itching in My Heart"	Holland–Dozier–Holland	Brian Holland, Lamont Dozier	2:54
17.	"He's All I Got"	Holland–Dozier–Holland, James Dean	Brian Holland, Lamont Dozier	2:44
18.	"You Can't Hurry Love"	Holland–Dozier–Holland	Brian Holland, Lamont Dozier	2:54
19.	"Put Yourself in My Place"	Holland–Dozier–Holland, John Thornton	Brian Holland, Lamont Dozier	2:16
20.	"You Keep Me Hangin' On"	Holland–Dozier–Holland	Brian Holland, Lamont Dozier	2:47
21.	"Remove This Doubt"	Holland–Dozier–Holland	Brian Holland, Lamont Dozier	2:54
22.	"Love Is Here and Now You're Gone"	Holland–Dozier–Holland	Brian Holland, Lamont Dozier	2:49
23.	"There's No Stopping Us Now"	Holland–Dozier–Holland	Brian Holland, Lamont Dozier	3:02
24.	"The Happening"	Holland–Dozier–Holland, Frank De Vol	Brian Holland, Lamont Dozier	2:52
25.	"All I Know About You"	Holland–Dozier–Holland, Frank De Vol	Brian Holland, Lamont Dozier, Berry Gordy	1:56
26.	"L'amore Verra' (You Can't Hurry Love)"	Holland–Dozier–Holland, Alberto Testa	Brian Holland, Lamont Dozier, Peter Ricci	2:51
27.	"Se Il Filo Spezzerai (You Keep Me Hangin' On)"	Holland–Dozier–Holland, Giuseppe Cassia	Brian Holland, Lamont Dozier, Peter Ricci	2:44
28.	"Supremes Interview"	—	Booker Bradshaw	5:42

Disc 3 (all tracks shown as Diana Ross & The Supremes)
No.	Title	Writer(s)	Producer(s)	Length
1.	"Reflections"	Holland–Dozier–Holland	Brian Holland, Lamont Dozier	2:52
2.	"Going Down for the Third Time"	Holland–Dozier–Holland	Brian Holland, Lamont Dozier	2:32
3.	"In and Out of Love"	Holland–Dozier–Holland	Brian Holland, Lamont Dozier	2:39
4.	"I Guess I'll Always Love You"	Holland–Dozier–Holland	Brian Holland, Lamont Dozier	2:45
5.	"Forever Came Today"	Holland–Dozier–Holland	Brian Holland, Lamont Dozier	3:19
6.	"Some Things You Never Get Used To"	Nickolas Ashford, Valerie Simpson	Nickolas Ashford, Valerie Simpson	2:24
7.	"You've Been So Wonderful to Me"	Anna Gordy Gaye, Allen Story, George Gordy	George Gordy	2:32
8.	"Love Child"	R. Dean Taylor, Frank Wilson, Deke Richards, Pamela Sawyer	Berry Gordy, Deke Richards, R. Dean Taylor, Frank Wilson	2:59
9.	"Will This Be the Day"	Smokey Robinson, Pete Moore, Beatrice Verdi	Smokey Robinson, Pete Moore	2:49
10.	"Love Child" (alternate version)	R. Dean Taylor, Frank Wilson, Deke Richards, Pamela Sawyer	Berry Gordy, Deke Richards, R. Dean Taylor, Frank Wilson	2:53
11.	"I'm Gonna Make You Love Me"	Kenny Gamble, Leon Huff, Jerry Ross	Frank Wilson, Nickolas Ashford	3:07
12.	"A Place in the Sun"	Ronald Miller, Bryan Wells	Frank Wilson, Nickolas Ashford	3:29
13.	"I'm Livin' in Shame" (first version)	Pamela Sawyer, R. Dean Taylor, Berry Gordy, Frank Wilson, Henry Cosby	Berry Gordy, Deke Richards, R. Dean Taylor, Frank Wilson	3:08
14.	"I'm So Glad I Got Somebody (Like You Around)"	Lawrence Brown, Allen Story, George Gordy, Anna Gordy Gaye	George Gordy	3:38
15.	"I'm Livin' in Shame" (second version)	Pamela Sawyer, R. Dean Taylor, Berry Gordy, Frank Wilson, Henry Cosby	Berry Gordy, Deke Richards, R. Dean Taylor, Frank Wilson	3:04
16.	"I'll Try Something New"	Smokey Robinson	Frank Wilson, Deke Richards	2:25
17.	"The Way You Do the Things You Do"	Smokey Robinson, Bobby Rogers	—	1:43
18.	"The Composer"	Smokey Robinson	Smokey Robinson	2:54
19.	"The Beginning of the End"	Margaret Johnson	Frank Wilson	2:29
20.	"No Matter What Sign You Are" (first version)	Berry Gordy, Henry Cosby	Henry Cosby, Berry Gordy	2:55
21.	"The Young Folks"	George Gordy, Allen Story	George Gordy	3:15
22.	"No Matter What Sign You Are" (second version)	Berry Gordy, Henry Cosby	Henry Cosby, Berry Gordy	2:58
23.	"The Weight"	Robbie Robertson	Frank Wilson	3:02
24.	"For Better or Worse"	Pamela Sawyer, Joe Hinton	Frank Wilson, Henry Cosby	2:38
25.	"Someday We'll Be Together"	Jackey Beavers, Johnny Bristol, Harvey Fuqua	Johnny Bristol	3:26
26.	"He's My Sunny Boy"	Smokey Robinson	Smokey Robinson, Terry Johnson	2:21

== Credits ==
- Diana Ross – lead vocals on all tracks (except "Buttered Popcorn", backing vocals to Ballard's lead)
- Mary Wilson – vocals (Disc 1, all tracks; Disc 2, all tracks; Disc 3, tracks 1–4, 7, 9, 11, 12, 16, 17, 23, 24, 26)
- Florence Ballard – vocals (Disc 1, all tracks; Disc 2, all tracks except 18; Disc 3, tracks 2–4)
- Barbara Martin – vocals (Disc 1, tracks 1–8)
- Cindy Birdsong – vocals (Disc 3, tracks 7, 9, 11, 12, 16, 17, 23, 24, 26)
- The Temptations (Melvin Franklin, Eddie Kendricks, Paul Williams, Otis Williams, Dennis Edwards) – vocals (Disc 3, tracks 11, 12, 16, 17, 23, 24)
- Holland–Dozier–Holland (Brian Holland, Lamont Dozier, Eddie Holland) – backing vocals (Disc 1, tracks 15, 17)
- Four Tops (Levi Stubbs, Abdul "Duke" Fakir, Renaldo "Obie" Benson, Lawrence Payton) – backing vocals (Disc 1, tracks 15, 17)
- The Andantes (Jackie Hicks, Marlene Barrow, Louvain Demps) – backing vocals (Disc 3, tracks 3, 5, 8, 10, 13, 15, 18, 20, 22)
- Marlene Barrow – backing vocals (Disc 2, track 18; Disc 3, track 1)
- Maxine Waters – backing vocals (Disc 3, track 25)
- Julia Waters – backing vocals (Disc 3, track 25)
- Johnny Bristol – backing vocals (Disc 3, track 25)
