= The Supremes (2000 album) =

Box set by The Supremes
- Released: August 29, 2000
- Genre: Soul; pop
- Length: 4:31:33 (+ 36:10 for bonus disc)
- Label: Motown
- Producer: Harry Weinger

The Supremes chronology
40 Golden Motown Greats (1998)	The Supremes (2000)	20th Century Masters: The Best of Diana Ross & the Supremes, Vol. 1 (2000)

Professional ratings
Review scores
Source	Rating
Allmusic	4/5 stars
Austin Chronicle	4/5 stars

The Supremes is a 2000 box set compilation of the material by Motown's most popular act of the 1960s, The Supremes. The set covers The Supremes' entire recording history, from its first recordings as The Primettes in 1960 to its final recordings in 1976.

The set is four compact discs long; a bonus disc, An Evening with The Supremes, contained mostly unreleased live recordings and was included in the first 25,000 sets. Included in the set is a 70-page booklet with extensive essays, track annotations, and a full discography.

== Contents ==
=== Disc one: The Supremes: Early years ===
==== Track listing ====
1. "Tears of Sorrow" (The Primettes)
2. "Pretty Baby" (The Primettes)
3. "After All"
4. "The Boy That Got Away"
5. "I Want a Guy" [Original 45 Mix]
6. "Buttered Popcorn" [Alternate Version]
7. "Your Heart Belongs to Me" [Original 45 Mix]
8. "Let Me Go The Right Way" [Live]
9. "My Heart Can't Take It No More" [Original 45 Mix]
10. "A Breath Taking, First Sight Soul Shaking, One Night Love Making, Next Day Heartbreaking Guy" (aka "A Breathtaking Guy") [Original 45 Mix]
11. "Run, Run, Run" [Original 45 Mix]
12. "When the Lovelight Starts Shining Through His Eyes" [Original 45 Mix]
13. "Where Did Our Love Go"
14. "Baby Love"
15. "Ask Any Girl" [Original 45 Mix]
16. "Come See About Me"
17. "Oowee Baby" [Original Mix]
18. "Shake"
19. "Stop! In the Name of Love" [Alternate Version]
20. "Back in My Arms Again"
21. "It's All Your Fault" [Original Mix]
22. "Nothing but Heartaches"
23. "Take Me Where You Go"
24. "People" [Original Version featuring Florence Ballard]

==== Credits ====
- Originally recorded from 1960 to 1965.
- Lead and Background Vocals: Diane Ross, Mary Wilson, Florence Ballard, Betty McGlown and Barbara Martin
- Guest Background Vocals: The Four Tops: Levi Stubbs, Renaldo "Obie" Benson, Lawrence Payton, and Abdul "Duke" Fakir (on "Run, Run, Run" and "When the Lovelight Starts Shining Through His Eyes")
- Producers: Hom-Rich, Smokey Robinson, Berry Gordy, and Holland-Dozier-Holland
- Instrumentation: The Funk Brothers and L.A. session artists

=== Disc two: The Supremes: The success years ===
==== Track listing ====
1. "I Hear a Symphony"
2. "My World Is Empty Without You"
3. "Everything Is Good About You" [Stereo Mix]
4. "Any Girl in Love (Knows What I'm Going Through)"
5. "Surfer Boy" [Original Mix]
6. "Dr. Goldfoot and the Bikini Machine"
7. "Love Is Like an Itching in My Heart"
8. "You Can't Hurry Love"
9. "Mother Dear" [Version 2]
10. "You Keep Me Hangin' On"
11. "Going Down for the Third Time" [Original 45 Mix]
12. "Love Is Here and Now You're Gone" [Alternate Version]
13. "There's No Stopping Us Now" [Original 45 Mix]
14. "Come on and See Me" [Original Mix]
15. "My Guy"
16. "Falling in Love With Love"
17. "The Happening" [Demo Version]
18. "All I Know About You" [Stereo Mix]
19. "When You Wish Upon a Star"
20. "Somewhere" (Live at the Copacabana, May 20, 1967)
21. "Group Introduction" (Live at the Copacabana, May 20, 1967)
22. "You're Nobody till Somebody Loves You" (Live at the Copacabana, May 20, 1967)

==== Credits ====
- Originally recorded from 1965 to 1967.
- Lead Vocals: Diana Ross and Mary Wilson
- Background Vocals: Diana Ross, Mary Wilson, and Florence Ballard
- Background Vocals: The Andantes on (Additional Vocals on Surfer Boy)
- Producers: Holland-Dozier-Holland
- Instrumentation: The Funk Brothers and L.A. session artists

=== Disc three: Diana Ross & the Supremes ===
==== Track listing ====
1. "Reflections"
2. "In and Out of Love"
3. "Heaven Must Have Sent You" [Original Mix]
4. "Forever Came Today"
5. "Some Things You Never Get Used To"
6. "The Beginning of the End of Love"
7. "Love Child"
8. "How Long Has That Evening Train Been Gone"
9. "Does Your Mama Know About Me"
10. "He's My Sunny Boy"
11. "I'm Gonna Make You Love Me" (Diana Ross & the Supremes and The Temptations)
12. "I'll Try Something New" (Diana Ross & the Supremes and The Temptations)
13. "TCB" (Diana Ross & the Supremes and The Temptations)
14. "I'm Livin' in Shame"
15. "The Composer"
16. "Are You Sure Love Is the Name of This Game"
17. "No Matter What Sign You Are"
18. "The Young Folks" [Original 45 Mix]
19. "Stormy" **
20. "Can't Take My Eyes off You" [Alternate Version featuring Mary Wilson]
21. "The Weight" (Diana Ross & the Supremes and The Temptations)
22. "The Beginning of the End"
23. "Someday We'll Be Together"

==== Credits ====
- Originally recorded from 1967 to 1969.
- Lead Vocals: Diana Ross, Mary Wilson, Eddie Kendricks, Melvin Franklin, Paul Williams, and Johnny Bristol
- Background Vocals: Diana Ross, Mary Wilson, Florence Ballard, Cindy Birdsong, The Andantes, Syreeta Wright, Maxine Waters, Julia Waters, Otis Williams, Eddie Kendricks, Dennis Edwards, Melvin Franklin, and Paul Williams
- Producers: Holland-Dozier-Holland, Nickolas Ashford & Valerie Simpson, Frank Wilson, Berry Gordy, R. Dean Taylor, Deke Richards, Henry Cosby, and Johnny Bristol
- Instrumentation: The Funk Brothers and L.A. session artists

=== Disc four: The "New Supremes" ===
==== Track listing ====
1. "Up the Ladder to the Roof" [Original 45 Mix]
2. "Bill, When Are You Coming Back" [Original 45 Mix]
3. "Everybody's Got the Right to Love"
4. "The Day Will Come Between Sunday and Monday"
5. "Stoned Love"
6. "River Deep-Mountain High" (The Supremes & Four Tops)
7. "You Gotta Have Love in Your Heart" (The Supremes & Four Tops)
8. "Touch" [Promotion Only Stereo Single Mix]
9. "Nathan Jones"
10. "Floy Joy" [Unedited Version]
11. "Automatically Sunshine"
12. "Your Wonderful, Sweet Sweet Love"
13. "I Guess I'll Miss the Man"
14. "5:30 Plane"
15. "Bad Weather"
16. "He's My Man"
17. "High Energy"
18. "I'm Gonna Let My Heart Do the Walking" [Extended Version]
19. "You're My Driving Wheel" [Promotion Only Single Mix]
20. "You Are the Heart of Me"

==== Credits ====
- Originally recorded from 1969 to 1976.
- Lead Vocals: Jean Terrell, Mary Wilson, Scherrie Payne, Susaye Greene, and Levi Stubbs
- Background Vocals: Jean Terrell, Mary Wilson, Cindy Birdsong, Lynda Lawrence, Scherrie Payne, Susaye Greene, Levi Stubbs, Renaldo "Obie" Benson, Lawrence Payton, and Abdul "Duke" Fakir
- Producers: Frank Wilson, Johnny Bristol, Nickolas Ashford & Valerie Simpson, Smokey Robinson, Jimmy Webb, Stevie Wonder, and Holland-Dozier-Holland
- Instrumentation: The Funk Brothers and L.A. session artists

=== Bonus disc: An Evening with The Supremes ===
This disc is a compilation of live performances of the Supremes' most popular songs, issued with the first 25,000 box sets manufactured. All tracks are previously unreleased except "Someday We'll Be Together", which was recorded on January 14, 1970 at the Diana Ross & the Supremes farewell concert, and released as the last track on the Farewell album.

==== Track listing ====
1. Introduction by Scott Regan / "Where Did Our Love Go" (live at the 20 Grand, Detroit, 1964)
2. "Baby Love" (live at the Fox Theater, Detroit, 1964)
3. "Come See About Me" (live at the Fox Theater, Detroit, 1964)
4. "Stop! In the Name of Love" (live at the Copacabana, New York, 1965)
5. "Back in My Arms Again" (live at the Copacabana, New York, 1965)
6. "Nothing But Heartaches" (live at the Copacabana, New York, 1965)
7. "I Hear a Symphony" (live at the Roostertail, Detroit, 1966)
8. Introductions
9. "You Can't Hurry Love" (live at the Roostertail, Detroit, 1966)
10. "You Keep Me Hangin' On" (live at the Roostertail, Detroit, 1967)
11. "Reflections" (live at the Roostertail, Detroit, 1967)
12. "Someday We'll Be Together" (live at the Frontier Hotel, Las Vegas, 1970)

==== Credits ====
- Originally recorded from 1964 to 1970.
- Lead Vocals: Diana Ross
- Background Vocals: Mary Wilson, Florence Ballard, and Cindy Birdsong
