= List of cover versions of Miracles songs =

This is a list of covers of Miracles songs that have been recorded and released. According to several websites, the Miracles are one of the most covered groups in recorded history and the most covered Motown group ever. Their music and songs have influenced artists all over the world – in every major musical genre – over the last 60 years.

== "(Come 'Round Here) I'm the One You Need" ==
Year	Covered by	Album
1967	The Cowsills	The Cowsills
1970	The Jackson 5	ABC

== "(You Can) Depend on Me" ==
Year	Covered by	Album
1960	The Supremes	Let the Music Play: Supreme Rarities 1960–1969
1962	Mary Wells	Looking Back: 1961–1964
1964	Brenda Holloway	Every Little Bit Hurts
1965	The Temptations	The Temptations Sing Smokey
1967	Barbara Mason	–

== "(You Can't Let the Boy Overpower) The Man in You" ==
Year	Covered by	Album
1968	Chuck Jackson	Arrives!

== "A Fork in the Road" ==
Year	Covered by	Album
1984	Rebbie Jackson	Centipede

== "After All" ==
Year	Covered by	Album
1961	The Supremes	The Supremes
1970	The Marvelettes	The Return of the Marvelettes

== "Baby, Baby Don't Cry" ==
Year	Covered by	Album
1969	Gerald Wilson and His Orchestra	Eternal Equinox

== "Bad Girl" ==
Year	Covered by	Album
1961	Mary Wells	Bye Bye Baby I Don't Want to Take a Chance
1963	The Orlons	Not Me
1973	Jackie Jackson	Jackie Jackson
1982	Dazz Band	On the One

== "Can You Love a Poor Boy?" ==
This song, originally recorded by The Miracles, appears on their 1966 album, Away We A Go-Go. It was written by Stevie Wonder

Year	Covered by	Album
1967	Gil Bernal	–
1998	Softones	–
2000	Bobby Vee	–
2001	Ronnie Walker	–

== "Choosey Beggar" ==
Year	Covered by	Album
1979	Debby Boone	Debby Boone
2004	Chazz Dixon	Hitsville: The House That Berry Built

== "Darling Dear" ==
Year	Covered by	Album
1970	The Jackson 5	Third Album

== "Determination" ==
Year	Covered by	Album
1965	The Contours	–

== "Do It Baby" ==
Year	Covered by	Album
1976	Jimmy Ponder	Illusions
197?	Red Holt	–

== "Doggone Right" ==
Year	Covered by	Album
1970	Bobby Davis & The Sensations	–

== "From Head to Toe" ==
Year	Covered by	Album
1966	The Escorts	Single a-side
1967	Chris Clark	Soul Sounds, also single a-side
1982	Elvis Costello	Single a-side

== "Going to a Go-Go" ==
Year	Covered by	Album
1982	The Rolling Stones	Still Life
2010	Phil Collins	Going Back

== "Got a Job" ==
Year	Covered by	Album
1961	The Marcels	–

== "Happy Landing" ==
Year	Covered by	Album
1964	The Temptations	You've Got to Earn It (1962–1968)

== "Here I Go Again" ==
Year	Covered by	Album
1986	Oran "Juice" Jones	Juice
2000	Little Willie G.	Make Up for the Lost Time
2004	Chazz Dixon	Hitsville: The House That Berry Built

== "I Don't Blame You At All" ==
Year	Covered by	Album
1970	Rosetta Hightower	Rosetta

== "I Gotta Dance to Keep From Crying" ==
Year	Covered by	Album
1964	The High Numbers	–
1965	Jimmy James & The Vagabonds	–

== "I Like It Like That" ==
Year	Covered by	Album
1966	Mitch Ryder and the Detroit Wheels	–
2000	Bobby Vee	–

== "I Second That Emotion" ==
Year	Covered by	Album
1968	Diana Ross & The Supremes and The Temptations	Diana Ross & the Supremes Join the Temptations
1970	Kiki Dee	–
1978	Thelma Jones	–
1982	Japan	–
1994	Tammy Wynette	Without Walls
2004	Michael McDonald	Motown Two

== "If You Can Want" ==
Year	Covered by	Album
2001	The Dirtbombs	Ultraglide in Black

== "I'll Try Something New" ==
Year	Covered by	Album
1966	Spyder Turner (as an excerpt into "Stand by Me")	–
1966	Barbara McNair	Here I Am
1969	Diana Ross & The Supremes and The Temptations	Diana Ross & the Supremes Join The Temptations
1982	A Taste of Honey	Ladies of the Eighties

== "I've Been Good to You" ==
Year	Covered by	Album
1964	Brenda Holloway	Every Little Bit Hurts
1966	The Temptations	Gettin' Ready
1982	Marshall Crenshaw	Marshall Crenshaw

== "Love Machine" ==
Year	Covered by	Album
1979	Thelma Houston	Ride to the Rainbow
1982	Wham!	Fantastic

== "Mickey's Monkey" ==
Year	Covered by	Album
1965	Martha & the Vandellas	Dance Party
1965	The Hollies	Hollies
1966	The Supremes	–
1966	The Defenders	–
1977	Mother's Finest	Another Mother Further
1984	Warren Mills	Warren Mills

== "Mighty Good Lovin'" ==
Year	Covered by	Album
1969	Edwin Starr	–
196?	Chris Clark	–

== "More Love" ==
Year	Covered by	Album
1973	Foster Sylvers	Foster Sylvers
1980	Kim Carnes	Romance Dance
1990	Mica Paris	Contribution
1994	Paul Young	Reflections

== "My Girl Has Gone" ==
A Top 20 1965 hit (Top 10 R&B).

Year	Covered by	Album
1969	Bobby Taylor	Taylor-Made Soul
1970	Ken Parker	–

== "Ooo Baby Baby" ==
Year	Covered by	Album
1966	The Five Stairsteps	–
1973	Todd Rundgren (as part of his "Soul Classics Medley")	A Wizard, A True Star
1978	Linda Ronstadt	Living in the USA
1981	Sylvester	Too Hot to Sleep
1989	Zapp	Zapp Vibe

== "Oh Be My Love" ==
Year	Covered by	Album
1965	Barbara Lewis	The Many Grooves of Barbara Lewis
1972	The Supremes	Floy Joy

== "Shop Around" ==
Year	Covered by	Album
1961	Mary Wells	Bye Bye Baby I Don't Want to Take a Chance
1964	The Astronauts	–
1965	Bobby Vee	–
1968	Don Bryant	–
1969	Clarence Reid	–
1976	Captain & Tennille	Song of Joy
1983	The Spinners	–
2008	David Archuleta	–
2013	Angela Miller	American Idol Season 12 Top 8

== "The Love I Saw in You Was Just a Mirage" ==
Year	Covered by	Album
1970	The Jackson 5	Third Album

== "The Tears of a Clown" ==
Year	Covered by	Album
1971	Petula Clark	Petula '71
1979	The Merton Parkas	Face In the Crowd
1980	The Beat	–
1995	La Toya Jackson	Stop in the Name of Love
2002	Nnenna Freelon	Tales of Wonder
2004	Peter Cox	–
2010	Phil Collins	–
2010	Marc Cohn	Listening Booth
2014	Boyzone	Dublin to Detroit

== "The Tracks of My Tears" ==
Year	Covered by	Album
1967	Johnny Rivers	–
1969	Aretha Franklin	Soul '69
1970	Gladys Knight & the Pips	–
1973	Bryan Ferry	These Foolish Things
1975	Linda Ronstadt	Prisoner in Disguise
2004	Gavin DeGraw	–
2004	Michael McDonald	Motown Two
2007	Boyz II Men	Motown: A Journey Through Hitsville USA
2009	Rod Stewart	Soulbook

== "Way Over There" ==
Year	Covered by	Album
1961	The Marvelettes	Please Mr. Postman
1965	The Temptations	The Temptations Sing Smokey
1968	Edwin Starr	Soul Master

== "We've Come Too Far to End It Now" ==
Year	Covered by	Album
1974	The Escorts (US vocal group)	3 Down 4 to Go

== "What's So Good About Goodbye" ==
Year	Covered by	Album
1965	The Temptations	The Temptations Sing Smokey

== "Who's Lovin' You" ==
Year	Covered by	Album
1961	The Supremes	Meet the Supremes
1964	Brenda Holloway	Every Little Bit Hurts
1965	The Temptations	The Temptations Sing Smokey
1966	Brenda & the Tabulations	Dry Your Eyes
1969	The Jackson 5	Diana Ross Presents The Jackson 5
1987	Terence Trent D'Arby	Introducing the Hardline According to Terence Trent D'Arby

== "You've Really Got a Hold on Me" ==
Year	Covered by	Album
1963	The Beatles	With The Beatles
1964	The Supremes	A Bit of Liverpool
1965	The Zombies	Begin Here
1965	The Temptations	The Temptations Sing Smokey
1965	Sonny & Cher	–
1966	Percy Sledge	–
1967	Small Faces	–
1968	Barbara McNair	The Ultimate Motown Collection
1969	The Jackson 5	Motown Sings Motown Treasures
1971	Laura Nyro and Labelle	Gonna Take a Miracle
1973	Michael Jackson	Hello World: The Motown Solo Collection
1976	Cher and Gregg Allman	Two the Hard Way
1977	Eddie Money	Eddie Money
1984	Mickey Gilley	–
2003	Cyndi Lauper	–
2009	Rod Stewart	–

== List of Miracles songs covered and sampled by other artists ==
The Miracles, Motown's first group, are the most covered Motown group of all time. Their music and songs have influenced artists all over the world – in every major musical genre – over the last 60 years. Almost all of their hits were self-written, making them unique among Motown acts. Many of the Miracles' songs have been major hits or important recordings for other artists. Among these are:

(This is an incomplete list, as songs by the Miracles continue to be covered by more artists each year)

- "Going to a Go-Go" – The Rolling Stones, Phil Collins, The Hags, and Secret Affair.
- "I Second That Emotion" – Japan, Michael McDonald, Kiki Dee, The Manhattan Transfer, Jerry Garcia, Diana Ross & the Supremes with the Temptations, 10db, Tammy Wynette, José Feliciano, Emilie, Stuck In The Middle, Thelma Jones.
- "(Come 'Round Here) I'm The One You Need " – The Jackson 5, The Cowsills, The GP's
- "If You Can Want" – The Dirtbombs, Barbara McNair, Chazz Dixon.
- "Nowhere To Go- Kanye West (as the basis of his song "About An Angel"), Beanie Sigel (as "Got Nowhere"), Freeway
- "Much Better Off" – J Dilla.
- "You've Got The Love I Need" - J Dilla, Raekwon.
- "A Legend In Its Own Time" – J Dilla (as an exercept of his song "One Eleven").
- "Oh Be My Love"- Barbara Lewis, The Supremes, Barbara McNair.
- "I Don't Blame You At All" - Rosetta Hightower.
- "Mighty Good Lovin"-Edwin Starr, Chris Clark.
- "You're So Fine and Sweet" - The Undertakers.
- "I Like It Like That" - Bobby Vee, Mitch Ryder & the Detroit Wheels.
- "Would I Love You" - Len Barry.
- "Happy Landing" - The Temptations.
- "Special Occasion - Jim Gilstrap.
- "I'll Try Something New" – Diana Ross & the Supremes with the Temptations, Barbara McNair, A Taste of Honey, Spyder Turner (as an excerpt from his cover of "Stand By Me")
- "My Girl Has Gone" – Etienne Daho, Bobby Taylor, Edwyn Collins, Ken Parker.
- "Yester Love" – Gerald Wilson & His Orchestra.
- "The Love I Saw In You Was Just a Mirage" – The Jackson 5, Vance Gilbert, The Uniques
- "Love Machine" – Wham!, Thelma Houston
- "Determination" – The Contours.
- "Choosey Beggar" – Chazz Dixon, Debby Boone.
- "I've Been Good To You" – Marshall Crenshaw, Brenda Holloway, Joe Meek, The Temptones, Ray, Goodman & Brown (The Moments), The Ones, The Temptations.
- "Mickey's Monkey" – Mother's Finest, Martha and the Vandellas, The Supremes, The Hollies, The Young Rascals, John Mellencamp, Lou Christie, Cannibal & the Headhunters, The C.A.Quintet, The Defenders, Chris Catena, The Sugar Beats, The Mac Truque.
- "More Love" – Kim Carnes, Paul Young, Barbara McNair, Mica Paris, The 5th Dimension, Rick Webb, Foster Sylvers.
- "Ooo Baby Baby" – Linda Ronstadt, Brenda Holloway, Shalamar, Ruby Turner, Sylvester, Spirit Traveler, Five Stairsteps, Zapp, Laura Nyro, Ella Fitzgerald, Honey Cone, Human Nature, Fingazz
- "Shop Around" – Captain & Tennille, Don Bryant, The Astronauts, The Allusions, and Georgie Fame, Neil Merryweather and Lynn Carey, among numerous others.
- "The Tears of a Clown" – La Toya Jackson, The Beat, The Rocking Chairs, The Re-Bops, Nnenna Freelon, The Flying Pickets, Caligula, Human Nature, Enuff Z'Nuff, Eumir Deodato, Brian Ray, Marc Cohn, Phil Collins.
- "The Tracks of My Tears " – Linda Ronstadt, Aretha Franklin, Johnny Rivers, Gladys Knight & the Pips, Mongo Santamaría, Martha and the Vandellas, Bryan Ferry, Björns Vänner (as Ser Jag Ut Att Må Bra?), Dolly Parton, Boyz II Men, Human Nature, among many others
- "Darling Dear" – The Jackson 5.
- "Who's Lovin' You" – The Jackson 5, En Vogue, Terence Trent D'Arby, Brenda Holloway, The Supremes, The Temptations, Honey Cone, Stevie B., Archie Bell & the Drells, Nikka Costa.
- "You've Really Got a Hold on Me" – Percy Sledge, Barbara McNair, The Beatles, The Temptations, The Supremes, The Zombies, Aidan Smith, Sonny & Cher, Mickey Gilley, Eddie Money, Cyndi Lauper, The Bobs, Greg Brown, Small Faces, Bobby McFerrin, Derrick Harriott, UFO8, Mike and The Mechanics, and She & Him among many others.
- "I Gotta Dance to Keep From Crying" – The Who, Jimmy James.
- "From Head to Toe" – Elvis Costello, Chris Clark
- "A Fork in the Road " – Rebbie Jackson
- "Way Over There" – The Royal Counts, The Temptations, Edwin Starr, The Marvelettes, New Man, Eddie Adams Jr.
- "(You Can't Let the Boy Overpower) The Man In You" – Chuck Jackson
- "What's So Good About Goodbye" – Giant Sunflower, The Temptations, Quix*O*Tic
- "More, More, More of Your Love" – Bob Brady & the Con Chords
- "Doggone Right" – Bobby Davis.
- "After All" – The Supremes, The Marvelettes.
- "Swept For You Baby" – The Sylvers, The Blenders, The Tamlins (as Sweat For You Baby).
- "The Hurt is Over" – The DT's
- "Whatever Makes You Happy"- Jacki Gore, Steve Washington.
- "Save Me" – The Undertones
- "(You Can) Depend On Me" – The Temptations, The Supremes, Mary Wells, Brenda Holloway, Barbara Mason.
- "Baby Baby Don't Cry" – Gerald Wilson and His Orchestra, Projekt.
- "Can You Love a Poor Boy" – Bobby Vee, Softones, Gil Bernal, Ronnie Walker.
- "Bad Girl" – Dazz Band, Jackie Jackson, Mary Wells, The Orlons.
- "That's What Love Is Made Of" – Michael Jackson, Bobby Vee, Choker Campbell, The Magicians.
- "We've Come Too Far To End It Now"-The Escorts
- "Here I Go Again" – Chazz Dixon, Carey Bell, A.J. De Bravo, Little Willie G., Oran "Juice" Jones.
- "Point It Out"' – The Supremes and The Temptations.
- "Got A Job" – The Marcels
- "Whole Lotta Shakin' In My Heart (Since I Met You)" – The Hellacopters, Marv Johnson.
- "Give Me Just Another Day" – Young Jeezy (as the basis for his song, "Mr 17.5"), Schoolboy Q, Wade Waters, Christina Milian, Rick Ross, Marco Polo feat. Torae, and others.[63]
- "Do It Baby"- Jimmy Ponder, Red Holt (of Young-Holt Unlimited).
- "Who's Gonna Take The Blame" – Capone N. Noreaga (as the basis of their song "Live On Live Long").
- "Come On Do The Jerk" – The Righteous Brothers [64], The T-Bones
- "Don't Let It End ('Til You Let It Begin) - Betty Everett, The Studio Group
- "I Didn't Realize That The Show Was Over - Epik High (as an excerpt from their song "Encore")

References: Allmusic, The Covers Project, Second Hand Songs, "Who Sampled" website.

== See also ==
- The Miracles
- The Miracles discography
