= List of the Supremes members =

This page is a chronology of the Motown singing group the Supremes. It lists the members of the group during all phases of the group's history, and also includes a timeline.

The group originally formed as the Primettes, positioned as the female foil to the Primes, while Diana Ross and her three friends were still in high school. After the departure of Betty McGlown, the Primettes recorded a single, "Tears of Sorrow" (Lupine), with Barbara Martin as her replacement.

They became known as the Supremes after joining Motown, which released "I Want a Guy" on 9 March 1961. Martin left the group that summer, shortly after the release of "Buttered Popcorn", which featured Florence Ballard as the lead singer; the group then became a trio. Late 1963 saw their first Top 40 hit, "When the Lovelight Starts Shining through His Eyes", with Diana Ross as the lead singer.

== The Primettes ==
=== 1959 – Summer 1960 ===
- Diana Ross
- Mary Wilson
- Florence Ballard
- Betty McGlown

=== Summer 1960 – January 1961 ===
- Diana Ross
- Mary Wilson
- Florence Ballard
- Barbara Martin

== The Supremes ==
=== January 1961 – Spring 1962 ===
- Diana Ross
- Mary Wilson
- Florence Ballard
- Barbara Martin

=== Spring 1962 – June 1967 ===
- Diana Ross
- Mary Wilson
- Florence Ballard

== Diana Ross & the Supremes ==
=== June – July 1967 ===
- Diana Ross
- Mary Wilson
- Florence Ballard

=== July 1967 – January 1970 ===
- Diana Ross
- Mary Wilson
- Cindy Birdsong

=== April 2000 – August 2000 ===
- Diana Ross
- Scherrie Payne
- Lynda Laurence

== The Supremes ==
=== January 1970 – April 1972 ===
- Jean Terrell
- Mary Wilson
- Cindy Birdsong

=== April 1972 – October 1973 ===
- Jean Terrell
- Mary Wilson
- Lynda Laurence

=== October 1973 – February 1976 ===
- Scherrie Payne
- Mary Wilson
- Cindy Birdsong

=== February 1976 – June 1977 ===
- Scherrie Payne
- Mary Wilson
- Susaye Greene

=== March 25, 1983 ===
- Diana Ross
- Mary Wilson
- Cindy Birdsong
