= Anthology (The Supremes album) =

Diana Ross and the Supremes Anthology

Greatest hits album by Diana Ross and the Supremes
- Released: May 1974
- Genre: R&B
- Label: Motown
- Producer: Nickolas Ashford, Gil Askey, Johnny Bristol, Henry Cosby, Hal Davis, Lamont Dozier, Harvey Fuqua, Marc Gordon, Berry Gordy Jr., Brian Holland, Lawrence Horn, Clarence Paul, Deke Richards, Smokey Robinson, Valerie Simpson, R. Dean Taylor, Frank Wilson

Diana Ross and the Supremes chronology
The Supremes Live! In Japan (1973)	Diana Ross and the Supremes Anthology (1974)	The Supremes (1975)

Professional ratings
Review scores
Source	Rating
Allmusic (1974 edition)	5/5 stars
Allmusic (1986 & 1995 editions)	4/5 stars
Allmusic (2001 edition)	5/5 stars

Anthology, also known as Anthology: The Best of Diana Ross and the Supremes, first released in May 1974, is a series of same or similarly titled compilation albums by The Supremes. Motown released revised versions in 1986, 1995 and 2001. In its initial version, a 35-track triple record collection of hits and rare material, the album charted at No. 24 on Billboard's "Black Albums" and No. 66 on "Pop Albums".

The 1974 LP was included in Robert Christgau's "basic record library" of 1950s and 1960s music, published in Christgau's Record Guide: Rock Albums of the Seventies. In 2012, Rolling Stone listed the 2001 version of the album at No. 423 in its list of "Rolling Stone's 500 Greatest Albums of All Time".

== History ==
The Anthology series of Diana Ross and the Supremes' releases began in 1974 with a three-disc compilation album that surpassed in scope any releases previously compiled to represent "one of the 1960s' most popular groups". The three-album set not only included all of the R&B hits and most of the pop hits of Diana Ross and the Supremes, but also included several tracks of the band's more experimental material, including forays made by the band into 1960s British pop, country music and musical theatre. The August 1986 CD release of the album added 15 songs to a total of 50 while the re-release on September 28, 1995, raised the number to 52. On December 18, 2001, Motown released a fourth version of Anthology with 50 songs representative of The Supremes' period with Diana Ross. This version includes three previously unreleased versions of songs in addition to the 1960s hits and a selection of cover songs.

The 1974 and 2001 collections focused solely on the 60s Supremes with Diana Ross and Florence Ballard, whereas the 1986 and 1995 versions included hits by the 70s version of the Supremes, featuring Jean Terrell and Scherrie Payne as lead singers.

== Track listing ==
=== 1974 Edition ===
Side One (The Early Sessions)

1. "Let Me Go The Right Way"
2. "A Breath Taking Guy"
3. "When The Lovelight Starts Shining Through His Eyes"
4. "Standing At The Crossroads Of Love"
5. "Run, Run, Run"
6. "Where Did Our Love Go"

Side Two (The Big Boom)

1. "Baby Love"
2. "Ask Any Girl"
3. "Come See About Me"
4. "Stop! In The Name Of Love"
5. "Back In My Arms Again"
6. "Nothing But Heartaches"

Side Three (Non-Stop Hitmaking)

1. "I Hear A Symphony"
2. "My World Is Empty Without You"
3. "Love Is Like An Itching In My Heart"
4. "You Can't Hurry Love"
5. "You Keep Me Hangin' On"
6. "Love Is Here And Now You're Gone"

Side Four (New Horizons)

1. "The Happening"
2. "Reflections"
3. "In And Out Of Love"
4. "Forever Came Today"
5. "Some Things You Never Get Used To"
6. "Love Child"

Side Five (Versatile Stylists)

1. "A Hard Day's Night"
2. "Funny How Time Slips Away"
3. "You Send Me"
4. "Falling In Love With Love"
5. "I'm The Greatest Star"

Side Six (Memories, Moving On)

1. "I'm Gonna Make You Love Me" (with the Temptations)
2. "I'm Livin' In Shame"
3. "The Composer"
4. "I'll Try Something New" (with the Temptations)
5. "No Matter What Sign You Are"
6. "Someday We'll Be Together"

=== 1986 Edition ===
Except where otherwise noted, tracks composed by Lamont Dozier, Brian Holland and Eddie Holland.

1. "Your Heart Belongs to Me" (Smokey Robinson) – 2:34
2. "Let Me Go the Right Way" (Berry Gordy Jr.) – 2:33
3. "A Breathtaking Guy" (Robinson) – 2:21
4. "When the Lovelight Starts Shining Through His Eyes" – 2:39
5. "Standing at the Crossroads of Love" – 2:28
6. "Run Run Run" – 2:21
7. "Where Did Our Love Go" – 2:30
8. "Baby Love" – 2:34
9. "Ask Any Girl" – 2:43
10. "Come See About Me" – 2:36
11. "Stop! In the Name of Love" – 2:49
12. "Back in My Arms Again" – 2:51
13. "Nothing But Heartaches" – 2:55
14. "I Hear a Symphony" – 2:40
15. "My World Is Empty Without You" – 2:33
16. "Love Is Like an Itching in My Heart" – 2:55
17. "You Can't Hurry Love" – 2:46
18. "You Keep Me Hangin' On" – 2:41
19. "Love Is Here and Now You're Gone" – 2:36
20. "The Happening" (Frank DeVol, Dozier, Faye Hale, B. Holland) – 2:49
21. "A Hard Day's Night" (John Lennon, Paul McCartney) – 2:20
22. "Funny How Time Slips Away" (Willie Nelson) – 4:12
23. "You Send Me" (Sam Cooke) – 2:09
24. "Falling in Love With Love" (Lorenz Hart, Richard Rodgers) – 2:28
25. "I'm the Greatest Star" (Bob Merrill, Julie Styne) – 5:55
26. "Reflections" – 2:48
27. "In and Out of Love" – 2:38
28. "Forever Came Today" (Dozier, E. Holland) – 3:13
29. "Some Things You Never Get Used To" (Nickolas Ashford, Valerie Simpson) – 2:23
30. "Love Child" (Deke Richards, Pam Sawyer, R. Dean Taylor, Frank Wilson) – 2:54
31. "I'm Gonna Make You Love Me" (with the Temptations) (Kenny Gamble, Jerry Ross, Jerry Williams Jr.) – 3:06
32. "I'm Livin' in Shame" (Richards, Sawyer, Taylor, Wilson) – 2:55
33. "The Composer" (Robinson) – 2:58
34. "I'll Try Something New" (with The Temptations) (Robinson) – 2:17
35. "The Young Folks" (George Gordy, Allen Story) – 3:09
36. "No Matter What Sign You Are" (Henry Cosby, B. Gordy) – 2:47
37. "Someday We'll Be Together" (Jackey Beavers, Johnny Bristol, Harvey Fuqua) – 3:19
38. "Up the Ladder to the Roof" (Vincent DiMirco, Wilson) – 3:10
39. "Everybody's Got the Right to Love" (Lou Stallman) – 2:36
40. "Stoned Love" (Yennik Samoht, Wilson) – 4:05
41. "Nathan Jones" (Leonard Caston Jr., Kathy Wakefield) – 2:58
42. "Floy Joy" (Robinson) – 2:30
43. "Touch" (Sawyer, Wilson) – 3:39
44. "Automatically Sunshine" (Robinson) – 2:36
45. "Your Wonderful, Sweet Sweet Love" (Robinson) – 2:56
46. "I Guess I'll Miss the Man" (Stephen Schwartz) – 2:38
47. "Bad Weather" (Ira Tucker, Stevie Wonder) – 3:02
48. "It's All Been Said Before" (Dennis Lambert, Brian Potter) – 2:26
49. "I'm Gonna Let My Heart Do the Walking" (Harold Beatty, Holland, Holland) – 3:09

=== 1995 edition ===
==== Songs added to the 1995 edition ====
- "I Want a Guy" (Berry Gordy, Freddie Gorman, Brian Holland)
- "Buttered Popcorn" (Berry Gordy, Barney Ales)
- "Long Gone Lover" (William "Smokey" Robinson)
- "Send Me No Flowers"
- "Mother Dear" (Brian Holland, Lamont Dozier, Edward Holland Jr.)
- "Too Hurt to Cry, Too Much in Love to Say Goodbye"
- "He's All I Got"
- "Remove This Doubt"
- "Things Are Changing" (Brian Wilson/Phil Spector)
- "I'm Gonna Make It (I Will Wait for You)"
- "Then"
- "Sweet Thing"
- "Keep an Eye" (Nickolas Ashford, Valerie Simpson)
- "Discover Me (And You'll Discover Love)" (Beatrice Verdi, Johnny Bristol, Doris McNeil)
- "River Deep, Mountain High" (with the Four Tops) (Phil Spector)
- "Paradise" (Harry Nilsson)

=== 2001 edition ===
==== Songs added to the 2001 edition ====
- "I Want a Guy" (B Gordy, Freddie Gorman, B. Holland) – 2:54
- "Buttered Popcorn" (Barney Ales, B. Gordy) – 2:58
- "The Tears" (Robinson) – 2:49
- "Whisper You Love Me Boy" (single mix) (Dean, E. Holland) – 2:42
- "Mother Dear" (Dozier, Holland, Holland) – 2:45
- "This Old Heart of Mine (Is Weak for You)" (Dozier, Holland, Holland, Sylvia Moy) – 2:36
- "Things Are Changing" (Phil Spector) – 2:59
- "He" (Richard Mullan, Jack Richards) – 3:48
- "The Nitty Gritty" (Lincoln Chase) – 2:55
- "Sweet Thing" (Ivy Jo Hunter, William "Mickey" Stevenson) – 2:28
- "Try It Baby" (with The Temptations) (B. Gordy) – 3:50
- "It Makes No Difference Now" (Floyd Tillman) – 3:28
- "Ain't That Good News" (Cooke) – 2:49
- "Bewitched, Bothered and Bewildered" (Hart, Rodgers) – 2:16
- "Whistle While You Work" (Frank Churchill, Larry Morey) – 2:21
- "If a Girl Isn't Pretty" (Bob Merrill) – 3:14
- "Where Do I Go/Good Morning, Starshine" (Galt MacDermot, James Rado, Gerome Ragni) – 3:08
- "Can't Take My Eyes Off You" (Bob Crewe, Bob Gaudio) – 2:20
- "Rhythm of Life" (Diana Ross and The Temptations) (Cy Coleman, Dorothy Fields) – 4:13
- "The Impossible Dream" (live) (Joe Darion, Mitch Leigh) – 4:43

==== Songs removed from the 1986 edition ====
- "Ask Any Girl"
- "Automatically Sunshine"
- "Bad Weather"
- "Everybody's Got the Right to Love"
- "Falling in Love With Love"
- "Floy Joy"
- "Funny How Time Slips Away"
- "I Guess I'll Miss the Man"
- "I'm Gonna Let My Heart Do the Walking"
- "I'm the Greatest Star"
- "It's All Been Said Before"
- "Nathan Jones"
- "Standing at the Crossroads of Love"
- "Stoned Love"
- "Touch"
- "Up the Ladder to the Roof"
- "You Send Me"
- "The Young Folks"
- "Your Wonderful, Sweet Sweet Love"

== Personnel ==
=== Performance ===
- H. B. Barnum – conductor
- Diana Ross – vocals
- Mary Wilson – vocals
- Florence Ballard – vocals
- Barbara Martin – vocals
- Cindy Birdsong – vocals
- The Temptations (Melvin Franklin, Eddie Kendricks, Paul Williams, Otis Williams, Dennis Edwards) – vocals
- The Andantes – background vocals
- Maxine Waters – background vocals
- Julia Waters – background vocals
- Johnny Bristol – background vocals
- The Funk Brothers - instrumentation

=== Series production ===
- Nickolas Ashford – producer
- Gil Askey – producer
- H. B. Barnum – arranger
- Mathieu Bitton – design
- Candace Bond – executive producer
- Johnny Bristol – producer
- The Clan – producer
- Henry Cosby – producer
- Hal Davis – producer
- Lamont Dozier – producer
- Harvey Fuqua – producer
- Geoff Gans – art direction
- Marc Gordon – producer
- Berry Gordy, Jr. – producer
- George Gordy – producer
- Suha Gur – mixing, digital remastering
- Amy Herot – executive producer
- Dan Hersch – mastering
- Brian Holland – producer
- Lawrence Horn – producer
- Bill Inglot – mastering, compilation producer
- Wade Marcus – arranger, producer
- Sherlie Matthews – producer
- Warren "Pete" Moore – producer
- Gene Page – string arranger
- Clarence Paul – producer
- Kevin Reeves – mixing
- Deke Richards – producer
- Paul Riser – arranger
- Smokey Robinson – producer
- Valerie Simpson – producer
- Andrew Skurow – associate producer
- Phil Spector – producer
- R. Dean Taylor – producer
- Vartan – art direction
- Harry Weinger – compilation producer
- Norman Whitfield – producer
- Frank Wilson – producer
- Stevie Wonder – producer

== Certifications ==
Region	Certification	Certified units/sales
United States (RIAA)	Gold	500,000^{^}
^{^} Shipments figures based on certification alone.
