= The Never-Before-Released Masters =

Compilation album by The Supremes
- Released: July 1, 1987
- Recorded: 1961–1969
- Genre: Soul/Pop
- Length: 1:12:00
- Label: Motown
- Producer: George Solomon

The Supremes chronology
Anthology (1986)	The Never-Before-Released Masters (1987)	Love Supreme (1988)

Professional ratings
Review scores
Source	Rating
Allmusic	3/5 stars

The Never-Before-Released Masters is 1987 compilation album containing unreleased recordings recorded by Motown girl-group The Supremes from 1961 to 1969. It was the second CD release of unreleased recordings by The Supremes, the first being disc two of the 2 disc "25th Anniversary" compilation. Several other unreleased tracks appeared on earlier various artists compilations.

A majority of the recordings for the unreleased album Diana Ross & The Supremes Sing Disney Classics are featured on this compilation. Mary Wilson and Florence Ballard are both featured with lead vocals on two songs each. Mary Wilson is featured lead on "Our Day Will Come" and The Ballad Of Davy Crockett. Florence Ballard is featured lead on "Save Me A Star" and Silent Night.

== Track listing ==
1. "Sweet Thing"
2. "It's Going All The Way (To True Love)"
3. "A Little Breeze"
4. "Am I Asking Too Much"
5. "Stormy"
6. "Slow Down"
7. "Don't Let True Love Die"
8. "Too Much A Little Too Soon"
9. "Too Hurt To Cry, Too Much In Love To Say Goodbye"
10. "Can I Get a Witness"
11. "Come Into My Palace"
12. "I'm The Exception To The Rule"
13. "Our Day Will Come"
14. "Save Me A Star"
15. "Mr. Blues"
16. "Little Miss Loser"
17. "Fancy Passes"
18. "The Ballad Of Davy Crockett"
19. "Supercalifragilisticexpialidocious"
20. "Whistle While You Work"
21. "I've Got No Strings"
22. "A Dream Is A Wish Your Heart Makes"
23. "The Land Of Make Believe"
24. "Toyland"
25. "It Won't Be Long Til Christmas"
26. "The Christmas Song"
27. "Silent Night"

== Personnel ==
- Diana Ross - lead vocals and background vocals
- Mary Wilson - lead vocals and background vocals
- Florence Ballard - lead vocals and background vocals
- Cindy Birdsong - background vocals
- Barbara Martin - background vocals
- The Andantes - background vocals
