= After All (The Miracles song) =

1960 song written by Smokey Robinson

Song by The Miracles

from the album Hi... We're the Miracles
- Released: June 1961
- Recorded: Hitsville USA; 1960
- Genre: Doo-wop
- Length: 2:37
- Label: Tamla
- Songwriter: Smokey Robinson
- Producer: Berry Gordy, Jr.

"After All"

Song by The Supremes
- Released: 1961 (unreleased); 2000
- Recorded: August 1960
- Genre: Doo-wop
- Length: 2:46
- Label: Tamla; T 54045
- Songwriter: Smokey Robinson
- Producers: Berry Gordy, Jr.; Smokey Robinson

"After All"

Single by The Marvelettes

from the album Return of the Marvelettes
- A-side: "Marionette"
- Released: 1970
- Recorded: Hitsville USA, Golden World; 1970
- Genre: Soul
- Length: 3:20
- Label: Motown
- Songwriter: Smokey Robinson
- Producer: Smokey Robinson

The Marvelettes singles chronology
"That's How Heartaches are Made" (1969)	"Marionette" / "After All" (1970)	"A Breathtaking Guy" (1971)

"After All" is a 1960 song written by Smokey Robinson and originally recorded and released by The Miracles on the Tamla label. It was first recorded as an unreleased single by The Supremes for Tamla; it was supposed to be their first single but it was canceled in favor of "I Want a Guy", and their cover wasn't released until it appeared on the 2000 box set, The Supremes. The song is noted for both groups' unusual choices for leads. For the Miracles' version it serves as a rare lead for Claudette Rogers Robinson, instead of the group’s main lead, Claudette's husband, Smokey Robinson. In the Supremes' case it is their only single to feature Barbara Martin singing on lead vocals (although she does have a spoken line during the song "(He's) Seventeen"). Florence Ballard, Mary Wilson, and Diana Ross sing verses, and Martin sings the bridge (usually Ballard or Ross was given the lead on the group's recordings at that time). "After All" was also later covered by The Marvelettes, in the early 1970s, with group member Wanda Young Rogers as lead. (There's a connection to the two previous groups in that Wanda Young was the wife of Miracles member Bobby Rogers, and she was the only member of The Marvelettes on the song—as with the late-1960s singles of The Supremes, The Andantes served as background singers.) Their version appears on the album The Return of the Marvelettes, and later became the group's belated final single (it failed to chart).

== Personnel ==
The Miracles version

- Lead vocals by Claudette Robinson
- Background vocals by Smokey Robinson, Ronnie White, Bobby Rogers, and Warren "Pete" Moore
- Guitar by Marv Tarplin
- Other Instrumentation by The Funk Brothers

The Supremes version

- Lead and background vocals by Florence Ballard (1st verse), Mary Wilson (2nd verse), Barbara Martin (bridge), and Diana Ross (3rd verse)
- Musitron & Ondioline Instrumentation by Raynoma Liles Gordy
- Guitar by Marv Tarplin
- Other Instrumentation by The Funk Brothers

The Marvelettes version

- Lead vocals by Wanda Rogers
- Background vocals by The Andantes: Jackie Hicks, Marlene Barrow, and Louvain Demps
- Instrumentation by The Funk Brothers
