= Tears of Sorrow =

Single by The Primettes
- B-side: "Pretty Baby"
- Released: August 1960
- Recorded: March 1960
- Genre: Doo-wop
- Length: 2:32
- Label: Lu Pine; 120
- Songwriters: Florence Ballard; Diane Ross; Richard Morris
- Producer: Hom-Rich

The Primettes singles chronology
"Tears of Sorrow" / "Pretty Baby" (1960)	"I Want a Guy" (1961)

"Tears of Sorrow" is the first single by The Primettes, later known as The Supremes, released in 1960. This was their first and only single from Lu Pine Records. "Tears of Sorrow," along with the Mary Wilson (singer)-led "Pretty Baby", are the only known recordings that feature the vocals of Betty McGlown. It would later appear on the 2000 box set The Supremes. The Supremes would later rerecord the song at Motown, but this version would go unreleased until the 2008 compilation album Let The Music Play: Supreme Rarities 1960-1969.

== Credits ==
=== Tears Of Sorrow ===
==== Lu Pine version ====
- Lead vocals by Diana Ross
- Background vocals by Florence Ballard, Mary Wilson and Betty McGlown
- Instrumentation by Ron and the Red Vests

==== Motown version ====
- Lead vocals by Diana Ross
- Background vocals by Florence Ballard, Mary Wilson and Barbara Martin
- Instrumentation by The Funk Brothers

=== Pretty Baby ===
- Lead vocals by Mary Wilson
- Solo vocals on intro by Florence Ballard
- Background vocals by Florence Ballard, Betty McGlown, Diana Ross
