= Love Supreme (The Supremes album) =

Compilation album by Diana Ross & the Supremes
- Released: December 1988
- Recorded: 1964–1972
- Genres: R&B, pop, soul, psychedelic pop
- Length: N/A
- Label: Motown
- Producers: Brian Holland; Lamont Dozier; Frank Wilson; R. Dean Taylor; Pam Sawyer; Deke Richards; Henry Cosby; Nickolas Ashford; Johnny Bristol; Smokey Robinson

Diana Ross & the Supremes chronology
The Never-Before-Released Masters (1987)	Love Supreme (1988)	The Supremes ('70s): Greatest Hits and Rare Classics (1991)

Love Supreme is a 1988 compilation album by The Supremes, released on the Motown label. The album peaked at number ten in the UK and was awarded a silver disc for sales in excess of 60,000 copies.

== Track listing ==
=== Side one ===
1. "You Can't Hurry Love"
2. "Stop! In the Name of Love"
3. "Baby Love"
4. "Come See About Me"
5. "The Happening"
6. "I'm Gonna Make You Love Me" (with The Temptations)
7. "Automatically Sunshine"
8. "Love Child"
9. "Up the Ladder to the Roof"
10. "I'm Livin' in Shame"

=== Side two ===
1. "Stoned Love"
2. "Floy Joy"
3. "Where Did Our Love Go"
4. "You Keep Me Hangin' On"
5. "Love Is Here and Now You're Gone"
6. "I Second That Emotion" (with The Temptations)
7. "Reflections"
8. "Nathan Jones"
9. "In and Out of Love"
10. "Someday We'll Be Together"

== Personnel ==
- Diana Ross: vocals
- Mary Wilson: vocals
- Florence Ballard: vocals
- Cindy Birdsong: vocals
- Jean Terrell: vocals
- The Temptations (Melvin Franklin, Eddie Kendricks, Paul Williams, Otis Williams, Dennis Edwards): vocals
- The Andantes (Jackie Hicks, Marlene Barrow and Louvain Demps): background vocals
- Maxine Waters: background vocals
- Julia Waters: background vocals
- Clydie King: background vocals
- Johnny Bristol: background vocals

== Chart history ==
Name	Chart (1989)	Peak position
Love Supreme	UK Albums Chart	10

== Certifications ==
Region	Certification	Certified units/sales
United Kingdom (BPI)	Silver	60,000^{^}
^{^} Shipments figures based on certification alone.
