= Let the Music Play: Supreme Rarities =

Compilation album by The Supremes
- Released: March 25, 2008
- Recorded: 1960–1969
- Genres: Pop, R&B, soul
- Label: Hip-O Select

The Supremes chronology
Diana Ross & The Supremes Remixes (2007)	Let the Music Play: Supreme Rarities (2008)	The Definitive Collection (2008)

Professional ratings
Review scores
Source	Rating
Allmusic	4/5 stars

Let the Music Play: Supreme Rarities 1960-1969 (Motown Lost & Found) is a 2-CD set of The Supremes music released by Hip-O Records on March 25, 2008.

== Track listings ==
=== Disc one ===
1. "(You Can) Depend On Me"
2. "Tears of Sorrow" (version 2)
3. "Because I Love Him"
4. "Hey Baby" (version 1)
5. "Too Hot"
6. "You're Gonna Come to Me" (version 1)
7. "You're Gonna Come to Me" (version 2)
8. "It Makes No Difference Now" (alternate version)
9. "Come on Boy" (alternate version)
10. "Just Call Me" (stereo mix)
11. "I Saw Him Standing There"
12. "Not Fade Away"
13. "Ooowee Baby" (alternate mix)
14. "It's All Your Fault" (version 1)
15. "Hits Medley: Come See About Me/Baby Love/Stop! In the Name of Love"
16. "Cupid (alternate extended mix)"
17. "Take Me Where You Go" (version 3)
18. "Back in My Arms Again" (alternate vocal)
19. "You Can't Hurry Love" (alternate vocal)
20. "Mickey's Monkey"
21. "Uptight (Everything's Alright)" (alternate vocal)
22. "It's Not Unusual"
23. "(I Can't Get No) Satisfaction"
24. "Come and Get These Memories" (alternate mix)
25. "I Can't Help Myself" (alternate mix)
26. "Let the Music Play" (alternate vocal)

=== Disc two ===
1. "Don't Let True Love Die" (extended version)
2. "What a Friend We Have in Jesus"
3. "Every Time I Feel the Spirit"
4. "Believe in Me"
5. "The Beginning of The End of Love" (stereo mix)
6. "People" (unedited version)
7. "Over the Rainbow"
8. "Wish I Knew"
9. "I Can't Give Back the Love I Feel for You"
10. "I'll Set You Free" (alternate vocal)
11. "Ain't No Sun Since You've Been Gone"
12. "In the Evening of Our Love"
13. "Love Child" (alternate version)
14. "Those Precious Memories"
15. "I'm Livin' in Shame" (version 1)
16. "MacArthur Park"
17. "You're Gonna Hear from Me"
18. "Canadian Sunset"
19. "Autumn Leaves"
20. "The Look of Love"
21. "Someday We'll Be Together" (alternate vocal)
22. BONUS: Scott Regan Promos

== Personnel ==
=== Performers ===
- Diana Ross: lead vocals, background vocals
- Mary Wilson: lead vocals, background vocals
- Florence Ballard: lead vocals, background vocals
- Barbara Martin: background vocals
- Cindy Birdsong: background vocals
- The Andantes: background vocals

== Product details ==
- Number of Discs: 2
- Label: Hip-O Select
- ASIN: B0016CP1CI
