= The Definitive Collection (The Supremes album) =

Compilation album by The Supremes
- Released: 28 Sep 2008
- Recorded: 1963–1969
- Genres: Funk, R&B, pop, soul
- Label: Motown
- Producers: Brian Holland and Lamont Dozier tracks 1–14; The Clan tracks 15 and 16; Frank Wilson and Nickolas Ashford track 17; Johnny Bristol track 18

The Supremes chronology
Let the Music Play: Supreme Rarities (2008)	The Definitive Collection (2008)	Magnificent: The Complete Studio Duets (2009)

The Definitive Collection is a 2008 compilation album by The Supremes. It charted at #142 on the Billboard 200.

== Track listings ==
1. "Where Did Our Love Go" – 2:33
2. "Baby Love" – 2:36
3. "Come See About Me" – 2:40
4. "Stop! In the Name of Love" – 2:52
5. "Back in My Arms Again" – 2:54
6. "Nothing but Heartaches" – 2:57
7. "I Hear a Symphony" – 2:39
8. "My World Is Empty Without You" – 2:33
9. "Love Is Like an Itching in My Heart" – 2:56
10. "You Can't Hurry Love" – 2:46
11. "You Keep Me Hangin' On" – 2:41
12. "Love Is Here and Now You're Gone" – 2:47
13. "The Happening" – 2:51
14. "Reflections" – 2:51
15. "Love Child" – 2:55
16. "I'm Livin' in Shame" – 3:00
17. "I'm Gonna Make You Love Me" (with The Temptations) – 3:08
18. "Someday We'll Be Together" – 3:32
