= Cranford Nix =

- Born: Cranford Hamilton Nix Jr. January 17, 1969; Detroit, Michigan, US
- Died: March 12, 2002 (aged 33); Berkley, Michigan, US
- Occupations: guitarist, singer, songwriter
- Known for: Lead singer of The Malakas
- Spouse: Natatia Nix
- Children: 2

Cranford Hamilton Nix Jr. (January 17, 1969 – March 12, 2002), also known as Crannie or Little Man, was an American guitarist, singer, and songwriter. He was the lead singer and guitarist of punk band The Malakas.

== Early life ==
Nix was born on January 17, 1969, in Detroit. His father, Cranford Nix Sr., was a one-time professional banjo player who played with Lester Flatt and Earl Scruggs. He also played banjo on The Supremes' album The Supremes Sing Country, Western and Pop.

Nix struggled with heroin and alcohol addiction, and had been sent to rehab four times. He escaped from rehab three of those times but stayed and completed it the fourth time. His time in rehab inspired him to write his song "Cigarettes and Heroin".

== Music career ==
Nix was a member of the rockabilly garage band The Malakas, in which he was the vocalist and guitarist. Alongside him were the bassist, DJ Holman, and the drummer, Greg Crampton. They were signed with I-94 Recordings.

== Personal life ==
Nix had two children. He married Natatia Nix in the 2000s.

== Death ==
Nix was found dead of a heroin overdose by his father on March 12, 2002.
