= The Supremes Live! In Japan =

Live album by The Supremes
- Released: 1973 (Japan only); October 31, 2004 (5000 copy limited reissue)
- Recorded: June 3, 1973
- Venue: Shinjuku Koseinenkin Hall, Tokyo, Japan
- Genre: Soul, pop
- Label: Motown/Hip-O

The Supremes chronology
The Supremes Produced and Arranged by Jimmy Webb (1972)	The Supremes Live! In Japan (1973)	Anthology (1974)

The Supremes Live! In Japan is a live album released by The Supremes in 1973, culled from a live performance recorded on June 3, 1973 at Shinjuku Koseinenkin Hall in Tokyo, Japan. It was issued exclusively in Japan and also distributed in Europe, and was not released in the United States until 2004.

The line-up at the time of the concert consisted of original Supreme Mary Wilson, lead vocalist Jean Terrell and Lynda Laurence. The album was slated for release, but due to internal conflicts within the group and the sudden departure of both Terrell and Laurence, Motown shelved the project. It was released in Japan, but then suddenly withdrawn. The cover of the original album was used instead for a UK-issued compilation album released in 1974, compiling the Supremes' singles from 1970-73.

The album was issued by Hip-O Select Records in 2004 as a limited-edition CD release, as was The Temptations in Japan.

Professional ratings
Review scores
Source	Rating
Allmusic	4/5 stars

== Track listing ==
1. "Introduction"
2. "T.C.B"/"Stop! In the Name of Love"
3. Medley:
  1. "For Once in My Life"
  2. "I'll Take You There"
  3. "Cabaret"
4. "Stoned Love"
5. "Can't Take My Eyes Off You"/"Quiet Nights of Quiet Stars"
6. New Hit Medley:
  1. "Floy Joy"
  2. "Automatically Sunshine"
  3. "Nathan Jones"
  4. "Up the Ladder to the Roof"
7. "Hit Medley:
  1. "Reflections"
  2. "Where Did Our Love Go"
  3. "Baby Love"
  4. "My World Is Empty Without You"
8. "Bad Weather"
9. "Cherry Pie"
10. "Tossin' and Turnin'"
11. "Somewhere"

== Personnel ==
The Supremes

- Jean Terrell - lead and backing vocals
- Mary Wilson - lead and backing vocals
- Lynda Laurence - backing vocals

Technical

- Kaname Tajima - live recording producer
- Hideo Takada - recording engineer
- Hajime Mizuno - cover designer
