= The Supremes Sing Country, Western and Pop =

The Supremes Sing Country, Western & Pop

Studio album by the Supremes
- Released: February 22, 1965
- Recorded: 1962 – 1965
- Studio: Hitsville U.S.A., Detroit
- Genre: Country; pop; soul; R&B
- Length: 31:42
- Label: Motown
- Producer: Clarence Paul

The Supremes chronology
A Bit of Liverpool (1964)	The Supremes Sing Country, Western & Pop (1965)	We Remember Sam Cooke (1965)

Singles from The Supremes Sing Country, Western & Pop
- 1. "My Heart Can't Take It No More" Released: February 2, 1963

Professional ratings
Review scores
Source	Rating
Allmusic	3/5 stars
The Encyclopedia of Popular Music	1/5 stars
The Rolling Stone Album Guide	2/5 stars

The Supremes Sing Country, Western & Pop is the fourth studio album recorded by the Supremes, issued by Motown in February 1965. The album was presented as a covers/tribute album of country songs, as Ray Charles had done with his album Modern Sounds in Country and Western Music. However, over half of the selections on The Supremes Sing Country, Western & Pop were written in-house by Motown staffer Clarence Paul. One of the songs on the album is "My Heart Can't Take It No More", which the Supremes had recorded in 1962 and released in 1963 as a single.

The album was a modest success peaking at number 79 on the US Billboard Top LPs chart, with sales exceeding 38,000 copies.

== Track listing ==
Side One

1. "Funny How Time Slips Away" (Willie Nelson, originally by Nelson)
2. "My Heart Can't Take It No More" (Clarence Paul)
3. "It Makes No Difference Now" (Floyd Tillman, originally by Eddy Arnold)
4. "You Didn't Care" (Paul)
5. "Tears in Vain" (Paul)

Side Two

1. "Tumbling Tumbleweeds" (Bob Nolan, originally by Sons of the Pioneers)
2. "Lazy Bones" (Johnny Mercer, Hoagy Carmichael)
3. "You Need Me" (Paul)
4. "Baby Doll" (Paul, Stevie Wonder)
5. "Sunset" (Paul, Wonder)
6. "(The Man With the) Rock and Roll Banjo Band" (Paul, Berry Gordy, Jr.)

== Personnel ==
- Diana Ross, Florence Ballard and Mary Wilson - lead and background vocals
- Clarence Paul - producer
- Lawrence Horn - co-producer on "My Heart Can't Take It No More"
- The Andantes and other vocalists - additional background vocals
- Cranford Nix, Sr. - banjo (some tracks)

== Singles history ==
- "My Heart Can't Take It No More" b/w "You Bring Back Memories" (from Meet the Supremes) (Motown 1040, February 2, 1963)

== Chart history ==
Chart (1965)	Peak position
US Billboard 200	79
