= Let Me Go the Right Way =

Single by The Supremes

from the album Meet The Supremes
- B-side: "Time Changes Things"
- Released: November 5, 1962
- Recorded: Hitsville U.S.A. (Studio A); August 30, 1962
- Genre: R&B, rock
- Length: 2:31
- Label: Motown; M 1034
- Songwriter: Berry Gordy
- Producer: Berry Gordy

The Supremes singles chronology
"Your Heart Belongs to Me" (1962)	"Let Me Go the Right Way" (1962)	"My Heart Can't Take It No More" (1963)

Meet The Supremes track listing
- 11 tracks Side one: 1. "Your Heart Belongs to Me"; 2. "Who's Lovin' You"; 3. "Baby Don't Go"; 4. "Buttered Popcorn"; 5. "I Want a Guy"; Side two: 6. "Let Me Go the Right Way"; 7. "You Bring Back Memories"; 8. "Time Changes Things"; 9. "Play a Sad Song"; 10. "Never Again"; 11. "(He's) Seventeen"

"Let Me Go the Right Way" is a 1962 song written and produced by then Motown president Berry Gordy and released as a single by Motown singing group The Supremes. It was the group's fourth single and their second charted record following the dismal reception of their first charted single, "Your Heart Belongs to Me".

== Overview ==
=== Recording ===
Built on a frenetic and gritty R&B production, it featured an unpolished raw R&B vocal from Supremes lead singer Diana Ross, despite speculation that the song was led by Florence Ballard (who only led on one brief line -- "A go-go right!" -- at the beginning). In fact, Ballard, the high soprano in the group, was prominently featured in the background -- especially her ad-libs on the singles outro -- along with Mary Wilson while Ross sang in her natural register. Written and produced by Berry Gordy, the record talks of a woman who wants her lover to let her "go the right way" in their relationship rather than being "led astray." Featuring energetic vocals from all three ladies, it was the group's first recording and release as a trio following the departure of Barbara Martin. This single would be the last to be produced by Gordy until after the songwriting-producing team of Holland–Dozier–Holland left Motown in late 1967. A year after this release, H-D-H would become the group main producers.

=== Reception ===
Performing slightly better than "Your Heart Belongs to Me," the song peaked at number 90 on the Billboard Hot 100 and was the first release by the group to hit the Hot R&B Sides chart, where it peaked at number 26 helping the group to land a spot on the Motortown Revue later on that year.

== Personnel ==
- Lead vocals by Diana Ross and Florence Ballard (intro).
- Background vocals by Diana Ross, Florence Ballard and Mary Wilson.
- Produced and written by Berry Gordy.
- Instrumentation by The Funk Brothers and Marvin Gaye on drums.

== Chart history ==
Chart (1962–1963)	Peak position
US Billboard Hot 100	90
US Hot R&B/Hip-Hop Songs (Billboard)	26
US Cashbox Top 100	82
US Cashbox R&B	29
