= Buttered Popcorn =

Single by The Supremes

from the album Meet The Supremes
- B-side: "Who's Lovin' You"
- Released: July 21, 1961 (1st ver.); August, 1961 (2nd ver.)
- Recorded: Hitsville U.S.A.; April 1961
- Genre: Soul
- Length: 2:55
- Label: Tamla
- Songwriters: Berry Gordy, Jr.; Barney Ales
- Producers: Berry Gordy, Jr.

The Supremes singles chronology
"I Want a Guy" (1961)	"Buttered Popcorn" (1961)	"Your Heart Belongs to Me" (1962)

Meet The Supremes track listing
- 11 tracks Side one: 1. "Your Heart Belongs to Me"; 2. "Who's Lovin' You"; 3. "Baby Don't Go"; 4. "Buttered Popcorn"; 5. "I Want a Guy"; Side two: 6. "Let Me Go the Right Way"; 7. "You Bring Back Memories"; 8. "Time Changes Things"; 9. "Play a Sad Song"; 10. "Never Again"; 11. "(He's) Seventeen"

"Buttered Popcorn" is a 1961 song written by Motown executives Berry Gordy and Barney Ales, produced by Gordy, and released as a Tamla label single by Motown singing group The Supremes. It was the group's second single after signing with Motown Records (and their third overall) as well as their second, and last, single for the Tamla label, before moving to the Motown label.

== Recording ==
This is not only one of the rare singles to feature Florence Ballard on lead, but the only one with her as the sole lead. The song talks of a woman who's worried that her man is more concerned with eating "buttered popcorn" than anything else, as he eats it "For breakfast, lunch and a dinner too" as well his health "Well it worries me so I don't know what to do" . In the group's early days all of its members got a chance to sing lead on stage and in the recording studio, with Ballard having the role of main lead singer on stage. However Berry Gordy felt that the vocals of Diana Ross had a better chance at the targeted cross-over audience, as Ross had the most pop-sounding voice of the group.

1 line for the verse "more butter" is for the all girls from the group:

Florence: When I asked him what was happenin' in the world today. He said...

Florence: A more butter;

Florence and Mary: More butter;

Florence, Mary and Barbara: More butter;

Florence, Mary, Barbara and Diana: More.

Despite the fact that Ballard's leads were deemed "too soulful", "Buttered Popcorn" was considered by Motown's Quality Control department to be the best song to be issued as the Supremes' second Motown single. However, Berry Gordy was determined that Ross should be the group's main lead and wanted the group's cover of The Miracles' "Who's Lovin' You" to be the single's A-side. In the end, Gordy and Quality Control compromised; the Ballard-led song would remain the single's A-side, but the single would be promoted as if it was a "double A-side" one.

== Critical reception ==
Retrospectively, Stevie Chick of The Guardian, listed "Buttered Popcorn" as one of the best 10 Supremes songs. Chick expressed that Ballard was 'A bold, big-voiced belter' and described the song as 'A piece of raw, ribald soul lacking the polish that gilded their [The Supremes'] later hits'. Also, 'Ballard growls salaciously on Buttered Popcorn that her boyfriend "likes it greasy, and sticky, and salty, and gooey", a knowingly saucy performance that somehow escaped the interference of Motown's infamous Quality Control department.' Similarly, Bonnie Stiernberg of Paste wrote 'the innuendo-laced track is not unlike buttered popcorn—salty, fluffy, and oh so good'. Contemporary reviews of "Buttered Popcorn" include a B+ from Cashbox, whilst music columnist Wayne Harada in The Honolulu Advertiser called the song 'A novelty' which 'merits attention'.

== Commercial performance ==
Both sides of the single received a lot of airplay on local Detroit stations, but problems very quickly arose. The first version of the song was withdrawn because it was considered "too raw", and a smoother take was released. Gordy did little to promote the single's A-side, and, some time later, the label discovered that the song could be conceived to have a scandalous "double meaning", and switch to pushing the B-side alone before ceasing promotion of the single altogether. "Buttered Popcorn" received much airplay in Detroit and neighbouring cities, but failed to chart—as did all of the group's singles until "Let Me Go the Right Way" charted in December 1962.

== Personnel ==
- Lead vocals by Florence Ballard
- Background vocals by Diana Ross, Mary Wilson and Barbara Martin
- Instrumentation by The Funk Brothers
