= Meet The Supremes =

Meet the Supremes
- Original 1962 release

Studio album by the Supremes
- Released: December 9, 1962
- Recorded: October 1960 – September 1962
- Studios: Hitsville U.S.A., Detroit
- Genres: Pop; doo-wop; R&B
- Length: 29:36
- Label: Motown
- Producers: Berry Gordy; Smokey Robinson; Brian Holland; Lamont Dozier; Raynoma Liles

The Supremes chronology
| Meet the Supremes (1962) | Where Did Our Love Go (1964) |

Alternative cover
- Album cover for 1964 Stateside/EMI UK release

Singles from Meet the Supremes
- 1. "I Want a Guy" Released: March 9, 1961; 2. "Buttered Popcorn" Released: July 21, 1961; 3. "Your Heart Belongs to Me" Released: May 8, 1962; 4. "Let Me Go the Right Way" Released: November 5, 1962

Meet the Supremes is the debut studio album by the Supremes, released in late 1962 on Motown.

The LP includes the group's singles: "I Want a Guy", "Buttered Popcorn", "Your Heart Belongs to Me" and "Let Me Go the Right Way".

== Critical reception ==
Professional ratings
Review scores
| Source | Rating |
|---|---|
| Allmusic | 3/5 stars |
| The Encyclopedia of Popular Music | 3/5 stars |
| Tom Hull | B+ |

Andrew Hamilton for Allmusic, described "Your Heart Belongs to Me" as 'romantic and sentimental', writing it 'should have been the Supremes' first hit. It's every bit as charming as his chartbusters for Mary Wells.' Hamilton praised The Supremes' vocals, writing, 'Diana Ross' sweet tender lead, assisted by Mary Wilson and Florence Ballard's warm harmonies, could melt icebergs.' Furthermore, Hamilton praised their 'enthusiastic vocals' on "Let Me Go the Right Way". Hamilton also noted 'Ross' vocals on "Who's Lovin' You" are intense and bluesy; Wilson leads the soulful "Baby Don't Go"; and Ballard leads the raucous "Buttered Popcorn," a tune more suited for the Contours.'

Stevie Chick of The Guardian, listed "Buttered Popcorn" as one of the best 10 Supremes songs. Chick expressed that Ballard was 'A bold, big-voiced belter' and described the song as 'A piece of raw, ribald soul lacking the polish that gilded their [The Supremes'] later hits'. Also, 'Ballard growls salaciously on Buttered Popcorn that her boyfriend “likes it greasy, and sticky, and salty, and gooey”, a knowingly saucy performance that somehow escaped the interference of Motown's infamous Quality Control department.' Similarly, Bonnie Stiernberg of Paste wrote 'the innuendo-laced track is not unlike buttered popcorn — salty, fluffy, and oh so good'. Contemporary reviews of "Buttered Popcorn" include a B+ from Cashbox, whilst music columnist Wayne Harada in The Honolulu Advertiser called the song 'A novelty' which 'merits attention'.

On the contrary, Hamilton expressed that on their first recording, "I Want a Guy," 'the backing voices are buried, and Ross' voice sounds whiny and high-pitched', describing "I Want a Guy" and 'the '50s-sounding "He's Seventeen," as 'the only bummers'. More positively, "Time Changes Things" is noted as 'a forerunner to later efforts by Holland-Dozier-Holland', "Play a Sad Song" is described as a 'torching' ballad 'Blues lovers will relish' and the 'straight '50s doo wop' of "Never Again" drew a comparison to the Chantels.

American music critic Tom Hull noted the album is 'mostly songs by Berry Gordy Jr. or Smokey Robinson,' which 'spawned four singles that went nowhere, although "I Want a Guy" and "Let Me Go the Right Way" are catchy enough.'

== Track listing ==
All lead vocals by Diana Ross except where indicated

=== Side one ===
1. "Your Heart Belongs to Me" (Smokey Robinson) - 2:39
2. "Who's Lovin' You" (Smokey Robinson) - 2:49
3. "Baby Don't Go" (Berry Gordy, Jr.) (lead: Mary Wilson) - 2:13
4. "Buttered Popcorn" (Gordy, Barney Ales) (lead: Florence Ballard) - 2:35
5. "I Want a Guy" (Gordy, Brian Holland, Freddie Gorman) - 2:53

=== Side two ===
1. "Let Me Go the Right Way" (Gordy) (lead: Diana Ross, Florence Ballard) - 2:32
2. "You Bring Back Memories" (Robinson) - 2:39
3. "Time Changes Things" (Brian Holland, Janie Bradford, Lamont Dozier) - 2:33
4. "Play a Sad Song" (Gordy) - 2:57
5. "Never Again" (Gordy) - 3:01
6. "(He's) Seventeen" (Raynoma Liles, Marv Johnson) (lead: Diana Ross, Barbara Martin) - 2:47

== UK version ==
The 1964 UK release has a different tracklisting, featuring songs from the US album releases: Meet The Supremes and Where Did Our Love Go. It also contains the b-side "(The Man With The) Rock & Roll Banjo Band", which would later appear on The Supremes Sing Country, Western and Pop. Following the success of singles "Where Did Our Love Go" and "Baby Love", which peaked at number three and number one in the UK respectively, Meet The Supremes was released in the UK on Stateside (#SL 10109), whilst both singles were still in the top 40 of the UK Singles Chart. Meet The Supremes debuted at number 17 on the UK Albums Chart on December 5, 1964, rising to its peak of number 13, the following week. The album spent a total of 6 weeks in the top 20.

=== Side one ===
1. "Where Did Our Love Go" (Holland-Dozier-Holland) - 2:33
2. "Your Heart Belongs to Me" (Robinson) - 2:39
3. "Buttered Popcorn" (Gordy, Ales) (lead: Florence Ballard) - 2:35
4. "Baby Don't Go" (Gordy) (lead: Mary Wilson) - 2:13
5. "(The Man With the) Rock and Roll Banjo Band" (Clarence Paul, Gordy)
6. "I Want a Guy" (Gordy, Holland, Gorman) - 2:53

=== Side two ===
1. "When the Lovelight Starts Shining Through His Eyes" (Holland-Dozier-Holland) - 3:05
2. "You Bring Back Memories" (Robinson) - 2:39
3. "Play a Sad Song" (Gordy) - 2:57
4. "Time Changes Things" (Holland, Bradford, Dozier) - 2:33
5. "Never Again" (Gordy) - 3:01
6. "Standing at the Crossroads of Love" (Holland-Dozier-Holland) - 2:27

== 2010 expanded CD bonus tracks ==
In early 2010, Motown/Universal Records through Hip-O Select released a deluxe two compact disc edition of the album, which included both the mono and stereo versions of the album, as well as several outtakes, non-album tracks and live performances.

=== 2010 expanded CD bonus track listing ===
1. "Your Heart Belongs to Me" (Live 1962)
2. "I Want a Guy" (Live 1962)
3. "Time Changes Things" (Live 1962)
4. "Let Me Go the Right Way" (Live 1962)
5. "After All" (Stereo Mix) (Robinson) (Lead: Group)
6. "(You Can) Depend on Me" (Version 2) (Gordy, Robinson)
7. "The Boy That Got Away" (Alternate Mix) (Gordy)
8. "Hey Baby" (Version 2) (Gordy) (lead: Florence Ballard)
9. "Too Hot" (Version 1) (Gordy)
10. "Buttered Popcorn" (Version 3)
11. "Buttered Popcorn" (Version 4)
12. "I Want a Guy" (Version 1)
13. "Who's Lovin’ You" (Stereo Mix w/Mono Vocal)
14. "Because I Love Him" (Version 2) (Gordy)
15. "Save Me a Star" (Stereo Mix) (Gordy, Gwen Gordy Fuqua, Bradford) (lead: Florence Ballard)
16. "Heavenly Father" (Stereo Mix) (Edna McGriff) (lead: Florence Ballard)
17. "Those DJ Shows" (Stereo Mix) (Robinson)
18. "The Tears" (Stereo Mix) (Robinson) (lead: Mary Wilson)
19. "Your Heart Belongs to Me" (Version 1)
20. "I'm Giving You Your Freedom" (Alternate Mix) (Holland-Dozier-Holland)
21. "Run, Run, Run" (Live 1964) (Holland-Dozier-Holland)
22. "Standing at the Crossroads of Love" (Live 1964) (Holland-Dozier-Holland)
23. "Anyone Who Had a Heart" (Live 1964) (Burt Bacharach, Hal David)
24. "Time Changes Things" (Live 1964)
25. "Make Someone Happy" (Live 1964) (Betty Comden, Adolph Green, Jule Styne)
26. "Let Me Go the Right Way" (Live 1964)
27. "When the Lovelight Starts Shining Through His Eyes" (Live 1964) (Holland-Dozier-Holland)

== Personnel ==
- Diana Ross, Florence Ballard, Mary Wilson and Barbara Martin - lead and background vocals
- The Funk Brothers - instrumentation
- Berry Gordy - producer (some tracks); executive producer
- Smokey Robinson - producer (some tracks)
- Brian Holland, Lamont Dozier - producers on "Time Changes Things"
- Raymona Liles Gordy - musitron & ondioline instrumentation (some tracks); producer on "(He's) Seventeen"
- Barni Wright - cover design

== Singles history ==
- "I Want a Guy" b/w "Never Again" (Tamla 54038, March 9, 1961)
- "Buttered Popcorn" b/w "Who's Lovin' You" (Tamla 54045, July 21, 1961; re-recorded version issued in August)
- "Your Heart Belongs to Me" b/w "(He's) Seventeen" (Motown 1027, May 8, 1962)
- "Let Me Go the Right Way" b/w "Time Changes Things" (Motown 1034, November 22, 1962)

== Chart history ==
| Chart (1964) | Peak position |
|---|---|
| UK Albums (Official Charts) | 13 |
