= Your Heart Belongs to Me =

Single by the Supremes

from the album Meet The Supremes
- B-side: "(He's) Seventeen"
- Released: May 8, 1962
- Recorded: 1961
- Studio: Hitsville U.S.A., Detroit
- Genre: Doo-wop, pop
- Length: 2:37
- Label: Motown
- Songwriter: Smokey Robinson
- Producer: Smokey Robinson

The Supremes singles chronology
"Buttered Popcorn" (1961)	"Your Heart Belongs to Me" (1962)	"Let Me Go the Right Way" (1962)

Meet The Supremes track listing
- 11 tracks Side one: 1. "Your Heart Belongs to Me"; 2. "Who's Lovin' You"; 3. "Baby Don't Go"; 4. "Buttered Popcorn"; 5. "I Want a Guy"; Side two: 6. "Let Me Go the Right Way"; 7. "You Bring Back Memories"; 8. "Time Changes Things"; 9. "Play a Sad Song"; 10. "Never Again"; 11. "(He's) Seventeen"

"Your Heart Belongs to Me" is a 1962 song written and composed by Smokey Robinson and released as a single by Motown singing group the Supremes during their early years with the label. The song is about a woman whose lover is in the armed forces and has "Gone to a far-away land"; its narration has her tell him to always remember their love for each other if he ever gets lonely.

Recorded at a time when Mary Wells and the Marvelettes were the dominant female recording acts of the label, the Supremes had struggled to release singles with Supremes members Florence Ballard, Diana Ross and Mary Wilson switching lead vocal spots. After the failure of their first single, "I Want a Guy" with Ross in the lead, their second single, the Ballard-led "Buttered Popcorn", also failed to chart. Wilson's leads, meanwhile, had not been released on any Motown singles. For this record, Smokey Robinson decided to use Ross for lead vocals for the song. It would prove to be a modest success as the song became the Supremes' first nationally charted hit at number 95 on the Billboard Hot 100 but failed to chart on the Hot R&B Sides chart.

This became the last single that The Supremes made as a quartet. After this record, fourth member Barbara Martin left the group to start a family leaving Ross, Ballard and Wilson as a trio from then on. Martin is not pictured on the cover both due to her pending departure and because she was noticeably pregnant at the time of the photo shoot. Inspired by its modest charting, Berry Gordy would eventually make Ross the sole lead vocalist for the group.

It would not be until 1976 with the release of "I'm Gonna Let My Heart Do the Walking" that a Supremes single would feature four Supremes.

== Style ==
For this song, Smokey Robinson, who was the main songwriter and producer for Mary Wells during her Motown tenure, used exactly the same music style that he used with Mary Wells in a few of the several hits he wrote for her, including, "The One Who Really Loves You", "You Beat Me to the Punch", "Two Lovers" and "Laughing Boy". After this single, Marvin Gaye recorded an answer song titled "Soldier's Plea", which was his third single to be released.

== Personnel ==
- Lead vocals by Diana Ross
- Background vocals by Florence Ballard, Mary Wilson and Barbara Martin
- Produced and written by Smokey Robinson
- Instrumentation by The Funk Brothers

== Chart history ==
Chart	Peak position
US Billboard Hot 100	95
