= A Bit of Liverpool =

Studio album by the Supremes
- Released: October 16, 1964
- Studio: 1964 in Los Angeles
- Genres: Rock; R&B; pop
- Length: 27:29
- Label: Motown
- Producers: Hal Davis; Marc Gordon; Berry Gordy

The Supremes chronology
Where Did Our Love Go (1964)	A Bit of Liverpool (1964)	The Supremes Sing Country, Western and Pop (1965)

Professional ratings
Review scores
Source	Rating
The Encyclopedia of Popular Music	2/5 stars

A Bit of Liverpool, released as With Love (From Us to You) in the UK, is the third studio album by the Supremes, released in the fall of 1964 on the Motown label. It was produced by Berry Gordy with Hal Davis and Marc Gordon doing the mixing.

The Supremes performed the Beatles' "Eight Days a Week" on several television shows including Shindig and Hullabaloo, though the song did not make the album. The album featured covers of recent hits by British Invasion acts and also included two songs originally by Motown artists that had been covered by British groups: "Do You Love Me" (a UK hit for both Brian Poole and the Tremeloes, and the Dave Clark Five; and "You Really Got a Hold on Me" (an album track by the Beatles). The album just missed the Top 20 in the U.S., peaking at No. 21. While not quite as prolific as the Beatles, the Supremes enjoyed three albums charting simultaneously in 1964–65.

== Track listing ==
Side One

1. "How Do You Do It?" (Mitch Murray)
2. "A World Without Love" (John Lennon, Paul McCartney)
3. "The House of the Rising Sun" (Traditional)
4. "A Hard Day's Night" (Lennon–McCartney)
5. "Because" (Dave Clark)
6. "You've Really Got a Hold on Me" (Smokey Robinson)

Side Two

1. "You Can't Do That" (Lennon–McCartney)
2. "Do You Love Me" (Berry Gordy, Jr.)
3. "Can't Buy Me Love" (Lennon–McCartney)
4. "I Want to Hold Your Hand" (Lennon–McCartney)
5. "Bits and Pieces" (Dave Clark, Mike Smith)

Unreleased recordings from the A Bit of Liverpool sessions:

- "I Saw Him Standing There" – featuring Florence Ballard on lead vocals
- "Not Fade Away" – featuring Diana Ross, Florence Ballard and Mary Wilson on lead vocals

== Personnel ==
- Diana Ross, Florence Ballard and Mary Wilson – lead and backing vocals
- Berry Gordy, Hal Davis and Marc Gordon – producers

== Critical response ==
The critical response to the album has been poor. Among contemporary reviews, an anonymous reviewer in the San Francisco Examiner commented "the selection, 'You Can't Do That' rates the first slot on the album; the others just exist".

In 1982, The Illustrated Encyclopedia of Black Music described A Bit of Liverpool as one of "several banal albums" recorded in the midst of their run of hits. In 2008 author Mark Ribowsky, in his book on the Supremes, described the album as "a jolly old mess reeking of self-conscious preening" and the 2011 edition of The Encyclopedia of Popular Music rated the album 2 out of 5 stars.

== Chart history ==
=== Weekly charts ===
Chart (1964–1965)	Peak position
US Billboard 200	21
US Top R&B/Hip-Hop Albums (Billboard)	5

=== Year-end charts ===
Chart (1965)	Rank
US Top LPs (Billboard)	71
US Cashbox Top 100	83
