= Going Down for the Third Time =

Song by The Supremes

from the album The Supremes Sing Holland–Dozier–Holland
- A-side: "Reflections"
- Released: July 24, 1967
- Recorded: June 1966
- Label: Motown; M 1111
- Songwriter: Holland–Dozier–Holland
- Producers: Brian Holland; Lamont Dozier

"Going Down for the Third Time" is a song written and composed by Holland–Dozier–Holland, and recorded by Motown singing group The Supremes in 1967. The song was issued as the B-side to the popular "Reflections", being previously on the Supremes Sing Holland–Dozier–Holland.

== Background ==
The song was one of the last tracks to feature Ballard as a member of the Supremes. Ballard was replaced by Cindy Birdsong a year after the song was recorded.

== Critical reception ==
Dan Austin, writing for the Detroit Free Press in 2015, considered as good, if not better, then the song "Reflections". He called it "epic" song about "heartbreak that once again manages to make you want to break out your arm-flailing dance moves—like only Motown could seem to do".

Joey DiGuglielmo, writing for the Washington Blade in 2018, called "Going Down for the Third Time" one of the Supremes' "best deep album cuts".

== Personnel ==
- Lead vocals by Diana Ross
- Backing vocals by Florence Ballard and Mary Wilson
- Additional backing vocals by The Andantes (album version only)
- Instrumentation by The Funk Brothers

== Cover versions ==
- Phoebe Snow covered the song on her 1976 album Second Childhood.
