= Lu Pine Records =

- Founded: 1950s
- Country of origin: United States

Lu Pine Records was a small local record label in Detroit, Michigan, founded by Robert West. Mainly active during the late-1950s and 1960s but was reactivated for some time when its owner moved to Las Vegas in the 1970s. The label released records by a number of artists, including Joe Stubbs (brother of Four Tops lead singer Levi Stubbs), Eddie Floyd, The Falcons and The Ohio Untouchables (later renamed the Ohio Players). Prior to the emergence of Motown Records, it was the most significant African-American-owned record label in Detroit.

Lu Pine is most notable for releasing the first recorded material from The Supremes, then known as The Primettes, in March 1960. The quartet (later a trio) recorded two sides for the label: "Tears of Sorrow" (with Diana Ross on lead) and "Pretty Baby" with Mary Wilson on lead. The single failed to make a lasting impression, and The Primettes signed with Motown Records in January 1961 as The Supremes. Their other real success was The Falcons' "I Found a Love", featuring Wilson Pickett on lead vocal. The single was a tremendous hit (#6 Billboard R&B and #75 Billboard Top Pop) in 1962. This was Pickett's first hit record.

Atlantic Records signed a contract with Lu Pine to release selected singles for national distribution. In general, independent Lu Pine singles had a 3-digit number and those picked up and distributed by Atlantic (same label design) had a 4-digit catalog number (111 vs 1011). Lu Pine ran as a separate, independent label concurrent with the occasional Atlantic distributed singles.

Lu Pine's recordings were acquired in the 1980s by Rounder distributed Relic Records, which then published unissued and previously released material.

== See also ==
- List of record labels
