= Barney Ales =

American music industry executive (1934–2020)

Baldassare "Barney" Ales (May 13, 1934 – April 17, 2020) was an American music industry executive best known for his work at Motown, where he served as a sales and promotion executive and later as president. He played an important role in promoting Motown's recordings to the mainstream American music market during the company's rise in the 1960s and 1970s.

== Early life and career ==
Ales was born in Detroit, Michigan, on May 13, 1934, the son of Silvestro Ales, a barber who had emigrated from Sicily, and his wife Evelyn. He attended Thomas M. Cooley High School and subsequently worked on an assembly line at a Dodge automobile plant.

In the mid-1950s, Ales entered the music business when he took a position at the Detroit office of Capitol Records, working in sales and promotion. He developed relationships with local record retailers and radio stations, experience that later became important to his work at Motown. In 1959 he joined Warner Bros. Records as manager of the company's Detroit branch.

== Motown ==
Ales met Berry Gordy in 1960, and Gordy recruited him to join Motown as national sales and promotion manager. Ales helped establish the company's national sales and promotion operation as Motown expanded beyond Detroit and sought a wider audience for its recordings.

One of Ales's principal responsibilities was promoting Motown releases to record distributors, retailers, radio stations and programmers. His work helped the company's recordings reach audiences beyond the rhythm and blues market and contributed to Motown's success in the mainstream pop music market.

Motown was an unusual company in the American record industry of the period because it was a Black-owned business seeking to compete directly with larger, predominantly white-owned record companies. Ales later described the company's objective as being a general music company rather than an R&B or soul specialty label. Music historian and Motown chronicler Adam White noted that Ales's race also gave him access and influence among radio programmers and disc jockeys during an era in which race affected relationships within the music business.

Ales was also credited as a songwriter on several Motown recordings. His credits included "Once Upon a Time" and "What's the Matter with You Baby", both recorded by Marvin Gaye and Mary Wells.

== Later career ==
When Gordy moved Motown's headquarters from Detroit to Los Angeles in 1972, Ales left the company and remained in Detroit. He subsequently established the record label Prodigal. The venture was unsuccessful, and Ales returned to Motown in 1975.

After returning to Motown, Ales became executive vice president and subsequently served as president of the company. He left Motown again in 1979.

After his second departure from Motown, Ales worked with a number of record companies and music-industry figures. His later associations included Elton John's Rocket Records, Bob Guccione's Penthouse label, Norman Granz's Pablo Records, and George Clinton's company AEM.

== Death ==
Ales died on April 17, 2020, at the age of 85.
