= I Want a Guy =

1961 single by The Supremes

Single by The Supremes

from the album Meet The Supremes
- B-side: "Never Again"
- Released: March 9, 1961
- Recorded: Hitsville U.S.A.; December, 1960
- Genre: Doo-wop
- Length: 3:03
- Label: Tamla; T 54038
- Songwriter(s): Berry Gordy; Brian Holland; Freddie Gorman
- Producer(s): Berry Gordy, Jr.

The Supremes singles chronology
"Tears of Sorrow" / "Pretty Baby" (1960)	"I Want a Guy" (1961)	"Buttered Popcorn" (1961)

Meet The Supremes track listing
- 11 tracks Side one: 1. "Your Heart Belongs to Me"; 2. "Who's Lovin' You"; 3. "Baby Don't Go"; 4. "Buttered Popcorn"; 5. "I Want a Guy"; Side two: 6. "Let Me Go the Right Way"; 7. "You Bring Back Memories"; 8. "Time Changes Things"; 9. "Play a Sad Song"; 10. "Never Again"; 11. "(He's) Seventeen"

"I Want a Guy" is a song written by Freddie Gorman, Berry Gordy and Brian Holland and was the debuting single for Motown girl group The Supremes in 1961. It was also recorded by The Marvelettes on their album Please Mr. Postman. Featuring Diana Ross in lead, the song was a doo-wop ballad similar to what the Supremes had been recording since forming as "The Primettes" two years earlier.

The song's lyrics tell about a lonely woman who wants a new lover who won't mistreat her and always be loyal to her.

I want a guy to love me
One who will love me completely
Not like the last
Who's in the past
Who broke my heart and made me cry

When issued, the song failed to chart forcing Berry Gordy to find other options for the teenage quartet - its full lineup included Barbara Martin alongside Ross, Florence Ballard and Mary Wilson. Three members of the group (Ross, Wilson and Ballard), in fact, had already recorded a single, "Tears of Sorrow"/"Pretty Baby", in their previous quartet, "The Primettes". In between the two singles the teenaged girls would replace Betty McGlown with Martin, and the new quartet would be recording under a new name (and under a new record deal). This song would be issued as a b-side of a Marvelettes hit ("Twistin' Postman") later that year and would be led by Wanda Rogers, one of her first with the group. Their version, more up-tempo than the original, also would not chart nationally, but became a regional hit.

== Personnel ==
The Supremes version

- Lead vocals by Diana Ross
- Background vocals by Florence Ballard, Mary Wilson and Barbara Martin
- Musitron & Ondioline instrumentation by Raynoma Liles Gordy
- Other instrumentation by the Funk Brothers
  - Additional keyboards by Joe Hunter
  - Bass by James Jamerson
  - Drums by Benny Benjamin
  - Flute by Thomas "Beans" Bowles
  - Guitar by Eddie Willis and Joe Messina

The Marvelettes version

- Lead vocals by Wanda Young Rogers
- Background vocals by Gladys Horton, Georgeanna Tillman, Wyanetta "Juanita" Cowart, and Katherine Anderson
- Musitron & Ondioline instrumentation by Raynoma Liles Gordy
- Other instrumentation by the Funk Brothers
  - Bass by James Jamerson
  - Drums by Benny Benjamin
  - Guitar by Eddie Willis
  - Organ by Richard "Popcorn" Wylie
  - Piano by Marvin Gaye
  - Tenor saxophone by Hank Cosby
  - Baritone saxophone by Andrew "Mike" Terry
