= My Heart Can't Take It No More =

Single by The Supremes

from the album The Supremes Sing Country, Western and Pop
- B-side: "You Bring Back Memories"
- Released: February 2, 1963
- Recorded: Hitsville U.S.A. (Studio A); 1962
- Genre: Country
- Length: 3:00
- Label: Motown; M 1040
- Songwriter: Clarence Paul
- Producers: Clarence Paul; Lawrence Horn

The Supremes singles chronology
"Let Me Go the Right Way" (1962)	"My Heart Can't Take It No More" (1963)	"A Breathtaking Guy" (1963)

"My Heart Can't Take It No More" is a 1963 song recorded by The Supremes for the Motown label. Written and produced by Clarence Paul, "My Heart Can't Take It No More" charted at 29 on the Billboard Bubbling Under Hot 100 Singles chart. The group would not miss charting a single again on the Billboard Hot 100 chart for another 12 years.

Cash Box described it as "a tearful, beat-ballad hip-swinger...that the femmes carve out with loads of feeling."

== Personnel ==
- Lead vocals by Diana Ross
- Background vocals by Diana Ross, Florence Ballard and Mary Wilson
- All instruments by The Funk Brothers

== Chart history ==
Chart (1963)	Peak position
U.S. Billboard Bubbling Under Hot 100 Singles	129
