= Betty McGlown =

American singer (1941–2008)

- Also known as: Betty Travis
- Born: June 30, 1941; Detroit, Michigan, U.S.
- Died: January 12, 2008 (aged 66) Royal Oak, Michigan, U.S.
- Genres: R&B, pop
- Occupation: Singer
- Instrument: Vocals
- Years active: 1959–1960
- Label: Lu Pine
- Formerly of: The Primettes, Diana Ross, Florence Ballard, Mary Wilson

Betty McGlown-Travis (June 30, 1941 – January 12, 2008) was an American singer, a member of the Primettes, later better known as the Supremes.

== Biography ==
In 1959, McGlown started dating future Temptations member Paul Williams, who was then singing with the Primes. Around the same time, the Primes' booking agent and manager Milton Jenkins was scouting the Detroit neighborhoods looking for girls to become part of the Primes' sister act. After he discovered Florence Ballard, Ballard set about recruiting other girls she knew, quickly asking Mary Wilson. Primes member Paul Williams asked Diana Ross to join. Due to her connection with Williams, McGlown became the last to join the Primettes.

Along with their guitarist, Marv Tarplin, the girls performed for Berry Gordy who, although impressed, told them they were too young for the business and encouraged them to finish school. On Lu Pine Records, McGlown sang backing vocals for Mary Wilson on "Pretty Baby" and backing vocals for Diana Ross on "Tears of Sorrow". These became the only known recordings of McGlown, although her voice does not stand out by itself in either song.

While all four members sang lead on stage, it is only the other three members who ever had leads on studio recordings. McGlown eventually became Mrs. Betty Travis and left the Primettes in 1960 to concentrate on her new marriage. She was replaced by Barbara Martin the same year.

Betty McGlown-Travis died of diabetes in January 2008 at Beaumont Hospital in Royal Oak, Michigan, at the age of 66.
