= Reflections (The Supremes song) =

Single by Diana Ross & the Supremes

from the album Reflections
- B-side: "Going Down for the Third Time"
- Released: July 24, 1967
- Recorded: March 2 and May 9, 1967
- Studio: Hitsville U.S.A. (Studio A)
- Genre: Psychedelic soul
- Length: 2:50
- Label: Motown
- Songwriter: Holland–Dozier–Holland
- Producers: Brian Holland; Lamont Dozier

Diana Ross & the Supremes singles chronology
"The Happening" (1967)	"Reflections" (1967)	"In and Out of Love" (1967)

Audio sample
- "Reflections": file; help

Alternative cover

"Reflections" is a 1967 song recorded by the American R&B music group The Supremes for the Motown label. The single release was the first Supremes record credited to "Diana Ross and the Supremes", and the song was one of the last Motown hits to be written and produced by Holland–Dozier–Holland before they left the label. It was also one of the last singles to feature Florence Ballard before her dismissal in mid-1967.

It peaked at the #2 position on the United States' Billboard Hot 100 pop singles chart as well as the #5 slot on the UK Singles Chart in September 1967.

== Background ==
This single, released at the height of the Summer of Love and long, hot summer of 1967 and the Vietnam War, was the first Supremes' release to delve into psychedelic pop; Holland–Dozier–Holland's production of the song, influenced by the psychedelic rock sounds of bands such as the Beatles and the Beach Boys, represented the beginning of a shift in Motown's sound towards psychedelia. Although it is sometimes cited as one of the first mainstream pop recordings to feature a Moog synthesizer, the electronic sounds on the track were generated with a test oscillator treated with tape echo. Motown did, however, eventually purchase a Moog III synthesizer in December 1967.

== Release and reception ==
"Reflections" peaked on the charts in the late summer and early autumn of 1967. Making the highest debut on Billboard Hot 100 in the week ending August 12, the song reached number 2 in the week ending September 9, 1967. One place short of being the group's eleventh American number one, "Reflections" stalled at the penultimate position for two weeks behind Bobbie Gentry's "Ode to Billie Joe", which Diana Ross would cover for the Reflections album. "Reflections" also peaked at number 5 on the UK Singles Chart.

Cash Box said that "electronic effects are put to much use on this new outing from the Detroit mill, and the feedback play adds a cute appeal to the steady throbbing blues lament for an old love."

The first nationally televised performance to feature Florence Ballard's replacement, Cindy Birdsong, as a member of the Supremes (now billed as "Diana Ross & the Supremes") was on an episode of the ABC variety show The Hollywood Palace first broadcast on September 26, 1967.

A 2003 remix of the song, running 3:16, features a cold closing as originally recorded instead of a fade-out.

"Reflections" was used as the theme song for the television series China Beach from 1988 to 1991. It was also sampled in "Uh Huh Oh Yeh," the opening track on Paul Weller's 1992 eponymous debut solo album.

== Track listing ==
- 7-inch single (July 24, 1967) (North America/United Kingdom)
1. "Reflections" – 2:50
2. "Going Down for the Third Time" – 2:30

== Personnel ==
- Lead vocals by Diana Ross
- Backing vocals by Mary Wilson and Florence Ballard
- Instrumentation by the Funk Brothers:
  - Earl Van Dyke – Wurlitzer electronic piano, Hammond organ, test oscillator
  - James Jamerson – bass guitar
  - Richard "Pistol" Allen – drums
  - Joe Messina – electric guitar
  - Jack Ashford – percussion

== Charts ==
=== Weekly charts ===
Weekly chart performance for "Reflections"
Chart (1967–1968)	Peak position
Australia (Go-Set)	26
Australia (Kent Music Report)	34
Belgium (Ultratop 50 Flanders)	24
Belgium (Ultratop 50 Wallonia)	43
Canada Top Singles (RPM)	3
Canada RPM R&B	1
Iceland (Íslenski Listinn)	10
Ireland (IRMA)	16
Netherlands (Dutch Top 40)	3
Netherlands (Single Top 100)	4
UK Singles (Official Charts)	5
UK R&B (Record Mirror)	1
US Billboard Hot 100	2
US Hot R&B/Hip-Hop Songs (Billboard)	4
US Cashbox Top 100	2
US Cashbox R&B	6
US Record World 100 Top Pops	2
US Record World Top 50 R&B	4

=== Year-end charts ===
Year-end chart performance for "Reflections"
Chart (1967)	Rank
Canada Top Singles (RPM)	42
UK Singles (OCC)	42
US Billboard Hot 100	41
US Cashbox Top 100	21
US Cashbox R&B	71

== Sales ==
Sales for "Reflections"
Region	Certification	Certified units/sales
United States	—	1,000,000

== Other versions ==
A 1985 version by American singer Evelyn Thomas reached No. 18 on the Billboard Hot Dance Music/Club Play chart.

Luther Vandross included the song on his 1994 all-covers album Songs, which samples the original version's "beeping" intro.

== See also ==
- 1967 in music
- List of songs written by Holland, Dozier and Holland
