= Barbara Martin (singer) =

American singer (1943–2020)

- Also known as: Barbara Richardson
- Born: Barbara Diane Martin; June 16, 1943; Detroit, Michigan, U.S.
- Died: March 4, 2020 (aged 76) Detroit, Michigan, U.S.
- Genres: R&B, pop
- Occupation: Singer
- Instrument: Vocals
- Years active: 1960–1962
- Label: Motown

Barbara Diane Martin Richardson (June 16, 1943 – March 4, 2020) was an American singer, best known as one of the original members of Motown group The Supremes. She was born in Detroit.

== Career ==
After Betty McGlown left the Primettes because she was getting married, Martin replaced her in the group in 1960. She and her group mates, Diana Ross (then known as Diane), Mary Wilson and Florence Ballard, signed a recording contract with Motown founder Berry Gordy on January 15, 1961, as the Supremes, a name that Ballard had chosen (as she was the only group member in the studio at the time) from a list provided by Motown songwriter Janie Bradford; the group became part of the Motown stable of performers.

While recording a handful of early singles, none of which became hits, Martin, Wilson, Ross, and Ballard worked as studio backing singers, providing vocals and rhythmic effects such as hand claps, for Motown's leading groups. In October 1961, Martin became pregnant. Her husband supported her decision to stay in the group, but she left in the early spring of 1962 – leaving Ross, Wilson and Ballard as a trio.

Although Martin sang on many of the group's early singles (including a shared lead vocal with Diana Ross on "(He's) Seventeen"), and most of the tracks on the group's first album Meet the Supremes, she is not pictured on the album's cover.

== Later life ==
After leaving the group, Martin eventually earned a degree in psychology and worked in mental health. Out of respect for Diana Ross and Mary Wilson, she never spoke publicly about her tenure with the Primettes/Supremes. She denied interviews over the years, with the exception of one interview she gave in 2009 for the 2010 release of Meet the Supremes: Expanded Edition.

Martin died in March 2020 at the age of 76.
