= Florence Ballard =

American singer (1943–1976)

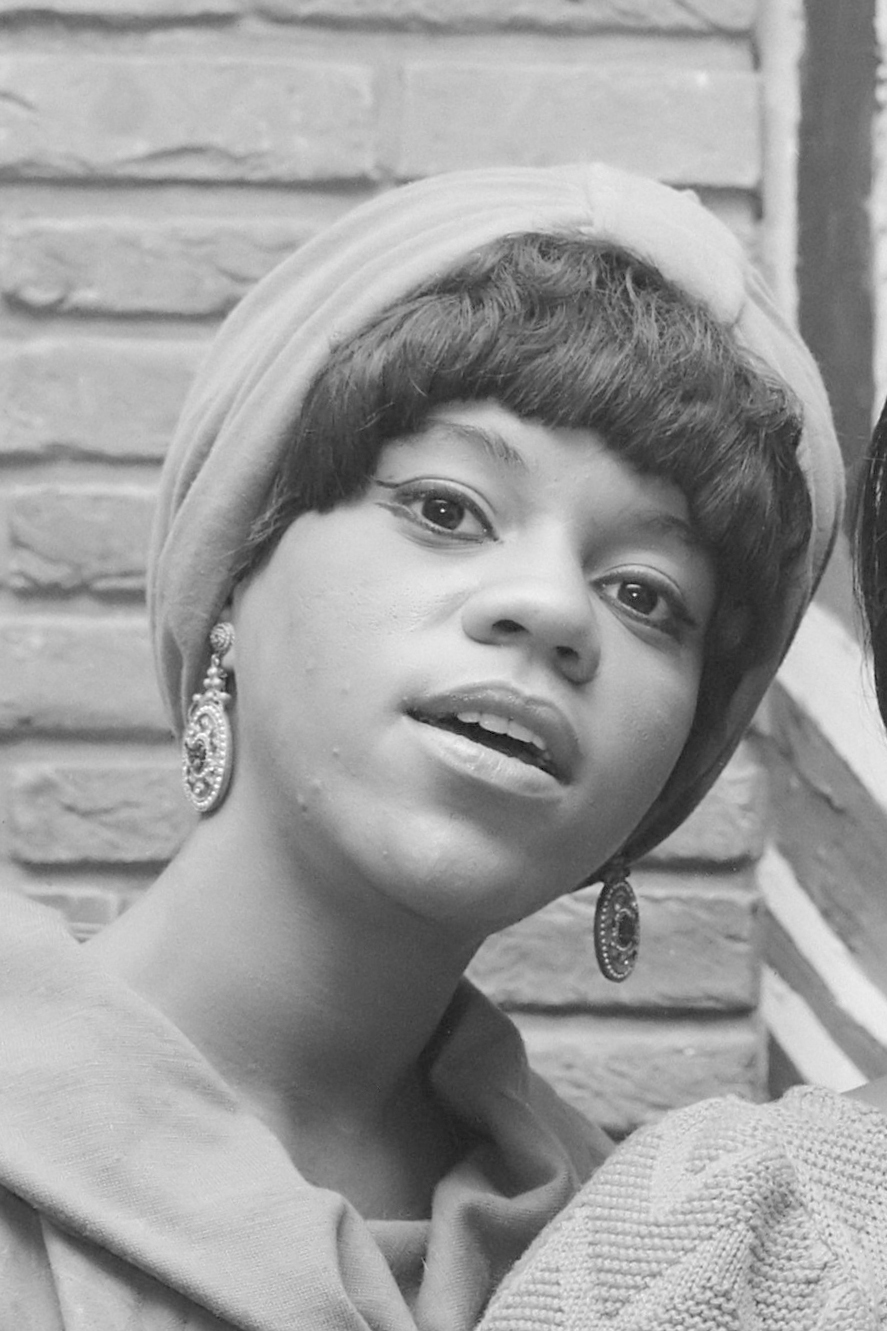
- Ballard in 1965
- Born: Florence Glenda Ballard; June 30, 1943; Detroit, Michigan, U.S.
- Died: February 22, 1976 (aged 32); Detroit, Michigan, U.S.
- Resting place: Detroit Memorial Park Cemetery
- Other name: Florence Chapman
- Occupation: Singer
- Years active: 1959–1970, 1975–1976
- Spouse: Thomas Chapman (m. 1968)
- Children: 3
- Musical career
- Genres: R&B; pop; soul; doo-wop
- Instruments: Vocals; tambourine
- Label: ABC

Florence Glenda Chapman (née Ballard; June 30, 1943 – February 22, 1976) was an American singer and a founding member of the Motown vocal female group the Supremes. She sang on 16 top 40 singles with the group, including nine number-one hits. After being removed from the Supremes in 1967, Ballard tried an unsuccessful solo career with ABC Records, before she was dropped from the label at the end of the decade. After struggling with alcoholism, depression and poverty for several years, she was in the midst of a musical comeback when she died of a heart attack in February 1976 at the age of 32. Ballard's death was considered by one critic as "one of rock's greatest tragedies". Ballard was the first woman posthumously inducted to the Rock and Roll Hall of Fame as a member of the Supremes in 1988.

== Early life ==
Florence Glenda Ballard was born in Detroit, Michigan on June 30, 1943 to Lurlee (née Wilson) and Jesse Ballard, as the eighth of 13 children or ninth of 15 children. Her siblings were Bertie, Cornell, Jesse, Jr., Gilbert, Geraldine, Barbara, Maxine, Billy, Calvin, Pat, Linda and Roy. Her mother came from Rosetta, Mississippi. Her brother Roy was killed by a drunk driver when he was three, and her mother gave birth to twins who died at 5 months old and a daughter who died in infancy. Her father was born Jesse Lambert in Bessemer, Alabama; after his grandmother was shot and killed, he was adopted by the Ballard family. Jesse Ballard left his adoptive parents at 13 and soon engaged in an affair with Florence's mother Lurlee, who was only 14, in Rosetta. The Ballards moved to Detroit in 1929 as part of the Great Migration. Jesse worked at General Motors. Jesse, an amateur musician, helped inspire Florence's interest in singing; he taught songs to her, accompanying her on guitar. Financial difficulties forced the Ballard family to move to different Detroit neighborhoods; by the time Florence turned 15 they had settled at the city's Brewster-Douglass housing projects, and the next year Jesse Lambert Ballard died of cancer.

Named "Blondie" and "Flo" by family and friends, Ballard attended Northeastern High School and was coached vocally by Abraham Silver. Ballard met future singing partner Mary Wilson during a middle-school talent show and they became friends while attending Northeastern High. From an early age, Ballard aspired to be a singer and agreed to audition for a spot in the sister group and local Detroit attraction, the Primes, who were managed by Milton Jenkins. After being accepted, Ballard recruited Mary Wilson to join Jenkins' group. Paul Williams of The Primes (who would later evolve into The Temptations), in turn, enlisted another neighbor, Diana Ross, then going by "Diane". Betty McGlown completed the original lineup and Jenkins named them "The Primettes". The group performed at talent showcases and at school parties before auditioning for Motown Records in 1960. Berry Gordy, head of Motown, advised the group to graduate from high school before auditioning again. Ballard eventually dropped out of high school though her groupmates graduated.

In 1960, Ballard was allegedly raped at knifepoint by local high-school basketball player Reggie Harding after leaving a sock hop at Detroit's Graystone Ballroom (she had arrived with her brother, but they lost track of each other). The rape occurred in an empty parking lot off Woodward Avenue. Ballard reacted by secluding herself in her house and refusing to come outside, which worried her groupmates. Weeks later, Ballard told Wilson and Ross what had happened and they were sympathetic. Both Wilson and Jesse Green, an early boyfriend of Florence's, had described her as a "generally happy if somewhat mischievous and sassy teenager." Wilson believes that the incident heavily contributed to the self-destructive aspects of Ballard's adult personality, like cynicism, pessimism and fear and distrust of others, but the rape was never mentioned again.

== Career ==
=== The Supremes (1959–1967) ===
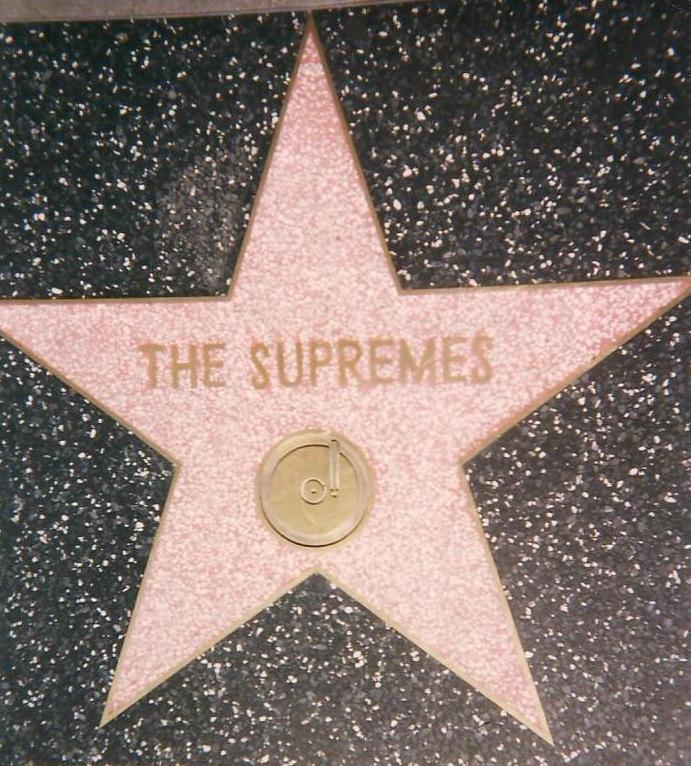
In 1994, the Supremes were recognized with a star on Hollywood Walk of Fame at 7060 Hollywood Blvd.

Later in 1960, the Primettes signed a contract with Lu Pine Records, issuing two songs that failed to perform well. During that year, they kept pursuing a Motown contract and agreed to do anything that was required, including adding handclaps and vocal backgrounds. By the end of the year, Berry Gordy agreed to have the group record songs in the studio. In early 1961, Gordy agreed to sign them on the condition they change their name. Janie Bradford approached Ballard with a list of names to choose from before Ballard chose "Supremes". The other members were displeased when they heard the new name. Diana Ross worried they would be mistaken for a male vocal group, but Gordy agreed to sign them under that name on January 15, 1961.

The group struggled in their early years with the label, releasing eight singles that failed to crack the Billboard Hot 100, giving them the nickname "no-hit Supremes". One track, "Buttered Popcorn", led by Ballard, was a regional hit in the Midwest, but still failed to chart. In the early spring of 1962 while the Marvelettes were on tour, Ballard briefly replaced its group member Wanda Young while she was on maternity leave. Before the release of their 1962 debut album, Meet the Supremes, Barbara Martin, who had replaced Betty McGlown a year before they signed to Motown, left the group and it became a trio. After the hit success of 1963's "When the Love Light Starts Shining Through His Eyes", Diana Ross became the group's lead singer.

In the spring of 1964, the group released "Where Did Our Love Go", which became their first number-one hit on the Billboard Hot 100, paving the way for ten number-one hits recorded by Ross, Ballard and Wilson between 1964 and 1967. After many rehearsals with Cholly Atkins and Maurice King, the Supremes' live shows improved dramatically. Ballard sang lead on several songs on Supremes's albums, including a cover of Sam Cooke's "(Ain't That) Good News". During live shows, Ballard often performed the Barbra Streisand standard, "People". According to Mary Wilson, Ballard's vocals were so loud she was made to stand 17 feet away from her microphone during recording sessions. Marvin Gaye, for whom Ballard sang backing vocals on occasion, described her as "a hell of a singer, probably the strongest of the three girls." Overall, Ballard contributed vocals to a total of sixteen top forty hit singles and fourteen top ten pop singles between 1963 and 1967.

=== Exit from the Supremes and solo career (1967–1970) ===
Ballard expressed dissatisfaction with the group's direction throughout its successful times. She would also claim that their schedule had forced the group members to drift apart. Ballard blamed Motown Records for destroying the group dynamic by making Diana Ross the star. Struggling to cope with the label's demands and her own depression, Ballard turned to alcohol for comfort, leading to arguments with Ross and Wilson. Ballard's alcoholism led to her missing performances and recording sessions. Gordy sometimes replaced Ballard on stage with the Andantes' Marlene Barrow. In April 1967, Cindy Birdsong, member of Patti LaBelle and the Blue Belles, became a stand-in for Ballard. A month later, Ballard returned to the group from what she thought was a temporary leave of absence. In June, Gordy changed the group's name to "Diana Ross and The Supremes", which was how they were billed on the marquee of Las Vegas' Flamingo Hotel.

On July 1, the day after her 24th birthday, Ballard showed up inebriated during the group's third performance at the Flamingo and her stomach bulged under her suit. Angered, Gordy ordered her to return to Detroit, and Birdsong officially replaced her, abruptly ending her tenure with the Supremes. It had been decided as early as May that Birdsong would replace Ballard once Birdsong's contract with the Bluebelles was bought out. In August 1967, the Detroit Free Press reported that Ballard had taken a temporary leave of absence from the group due to "exhaustion". Ballard married her boyfriend, Thomas Chapman, on February 29, 1968. A week earlier, on February 22, Ballard and Motown negotiated for her release from the label. Her attorney in the matter received a one-time payment of $139,804.94 (equivalent to $1,294,366 in 2025) in royalties and earnings from Motown. As part of the settlement, Ballard was advised not to promote herself by using her former membership in the Supremes. In March 1968, Ballard signed with ABC Records and released two unsuccessful singles.

In 1968, Ballard covered the hit "Walk On By", originally sung by Dionne Warwick and written by Burt Bacharach and Hal David. This was eventually included in The Supreme Florence Ballard album, which was released after her death on April 2, 2001.

After an album for the label was shelved, her settlement money was depleted from the Chapmans' management agency, Talent Management, Inc. The agency had been led by Leonard Baun, the attorney who had helped to settle Ballard's departure from Motown. Following news that Baun was facing multiple embezzlement charges, Ballard fired him. She continued to perform as a solo artist. In January 1969, Ballard performed at one of newly elected President Richard Nixon's inaugural balls. Ballard was dropped by ABC in 1970.

=== Decline (1971–1974) ===
In July 1971, Ballard sued Motown for additional royalty payments she believed she was due to receive but she was defeated in court by Motown. Shortly afterwards, Ballard and her husband separated following domestic disputes, and Ballard's home was foreclosed. Facing poverty and depression, Ballard developed alcohol use disorder and shunned the spotlight. In 1972, she moved into her sister Maxine's house. In 1974, Mary Wilson invited Ballard to join the Supremes (with their current lineup of Cindy Birdsong and Scherrie Payne) onstage at Magic Mountain. Though Ballard played tambourine, she did not sing and told Wilson she had no ambition to sing anymore. Later that year Ballard's plight began to appear in newspapers as word of her application for welfare benefits leaked out. Around that time, Ballard entered Henry Ford Hospital for rehab treatment. Following six weeks of treatment, Ballard began to slowly recover.

=== Comeback (1975–1976) ===
In early 1975, Ballard received a settlement from her former attorney's insurance company. The money helped her buy a house on Shaftsbury Avenue. Inspired by the financial success, Ballard decided to return to singing, and reconciled with her husband. Ballard's first concert performance in more than five years took place at the Henry and Edsel Ford Auditorium in Detroit on June 25, 1975. Ballard performed as part of the Joan Little Defense League and was backed by female rock group the Deadly Nightshade. Afterwards, she began receiving interview requests; Jet magazine was one of the first to report on Ballard and her recovery.

== Personal life ==
Ballard began dating Thomas Chapman, a Motown Records chauffeur, in 1967; they married in a private celebration in Hawaii on February 29, 1968, and had three daughters: twins Michelle Denise and Nicole Reneé (b. 1968) and Lisa Sabrina (b. 1972). Ballard reportedly had several domestic disputes with her husband and filed for divorce in 1973, but they reconciled in late 1975, shortly prior to her death. Besides her three daughters, Ballard's family included her cousin, rhythm and blues singer and songwriter Hank Ballard, and his grandnephew, NFL player Christian Ballard; she was also an aunt of the Detroit electronic musician Omar-S.

== Death ==
On February 21, 1976, Ballard entered Mt. Carmel Mercy Hospital, complaining of numbness in her extremities. She died at 10:05 ET the next morning from cardiac arrest caused by a coronary thrombosis (a blood clot in one of her coronary arteries), at the age of 32.

== Legacy ==
Florence Ballard's story has been referenced in a number of works by other artists. The 1980 song "Romeo's Tune", from Steve Forbert's album Jackrabbit Slim, is "dedicated to the memory of Florence Ballard". In his short story "You Know They Got a Hell of a Band", Stephen King, through the late disc jockey Alan Freed, includes Ballard as one of the deceased artists who performs in a town called "Rock and Roll Heaven".

Prior to her death, Mary Wilson had been lobbying the United States Postal Service to commemorate Ballard on a postage stamp.

Additionally, Ballard has been the subject of several published biographies:

Forever Faithful: A Study of Florence Ballard and the Supremes by Randall Wilson

All That Glittered by Tony Turner

The True Story of Florence Ballard by Maxine Jenkins, Ballard's sister

The Lost Supreme: The Story of Dreamgirl Florence Ballard by Peter Benjaminson

Supreme Exit by Nicole Chapman, Ballard's daughter

Dreamgirls, a 1981 Broadway musical, chronicles a fictional group called "The Dreams", and a number of plot components parallel events in the Supremes' career. The central character of Effie White, like Florence Ballard, is criticized for being overweight, and is fired from the group. The film version of Dreamgirls, released in 2006, features more overt references to Ballard's life and the Supremes' story, including gowns and album covers that are direct copies of Supremes originals. Jennifer Hudson won a Golden Globe Award and Academy Award for her portrayal of Effie White in the Dreamgirls film. In her Golden Globe acceptance speech, Hudson dedicated her win to Florence Ballard. The music video for the Diana Ross song "Missing You" pays tribute to Marvin Gaye, Ballard, and Paul Williams, all former Motown artists who had died. In 1988, Ballard was inducted to the Rock and Roll Hall of Fame as a member of the Supremes alongside Diana Ross and Mary Wilson.

In February 2020, a new play about Ballard by Vincent Victoria titled Dreamgirl Deferred premiered in Houston on the anniversary of her death.

In the 2013 Motown: The Musical Broadway stage play that launched on April 14, Ballard was portrayed by Sydney Morton.

As a member of the Supremes, Ballard was named as one of eight recipients to receive a Grammy Lifetime Achievement Award at the 65th Annual Grammy Awards in 2023.

== Abandoned biographical film ==
In 2010, news began to circulate that a biopic of Ballard's life, titled Blondie (based on Peter Benjaminson's book The Lost Supreme) was in the early stages of production. Faith Evans was signed on to portray Ballard, and appeared on several television programs, including The Wendy Williams Show, to promote the project. After many delays and the recasting of Evans and others associated with the film, it was announced that the entire project was a fraud.

== Discography ==
=== Album ===
- 2002: The Supreme Florence Ballard (compilation of 1968 ABC recordings and a selection of earlier Motown recordings Ballard led with The Supremes)

=== Singles ===
- 1961: "Buttered Popcorn" (Ballard solo)
- 1968: "It Doesn't Matter How I Say It (It's What I Say That Matters)" b/w "Goin' Out of My Head" (ABC Records 45-11074A/B)
- 1968: "Love Ain't Love" b/w "Forever Faithful" (ABC Records 45-11144A/B)
