= This Is the Story: The '70s Albums, Vol. 1 – 1970–1973: The Jean Terrell Years =

This Is the Story: The '70s Albums, Vol. 1 - 1970–1973: The Jean Terrell Years

Box set by The Supremes
- Released: December 12, 2006
- Recorded: 1970–1973
- Genres: Pop, R&B
- Length: 3 hours +
- Labels: Motown, Hip-O Select

The Supremes chronology
The Supremes: Gold (2005)	This Is the Story: The '70s Albums, Vol. 1 - 1970–1973: The Jean Terrell Years (2006)	Soul Legends (2006)

Professional ratings
Review scores
Source	Rating
Allmusic	4.5/5 stars

This Is The Story is a box set, released in 2006, comprising The Supremes' albums from the period 1970–1973, featuring new lead singer Jean Terrell, along with Mary Wilson, Cindy Birdsong and Lynda Laurence (who replaced Birdsong in 1972.) In addition to the five studio albums Right On, New Ways But Love Stays, Touch, Floy Joy, and The Supremes Produced and Arranged by Jimmy Webb, the set also includes thirteen tracks from the group's unreleased 1972 album, Promises Kept. Not included from the same time period are the three duet albums recorded with Four Tops; these were issued in full in 2009 on the 2-CD compilation Magnificent - The Complete Studio Duets, which included 13 previously unreleased recordings.

A follow-up box set, entitled Let Yourself Go: The '70s Albums, Vol 2 – 1974–1977: The Final Sessions was released in May 2011. It features Scherrie Payne (who replaced Jean Terrell) alongside Mary Wilson, Cindy Birdsong, and Susaye Greene (who replaced Birdsong on the group's final two albums.)

== Track listing ==
CD 1

1. "Up the Ladder to the Roof"
2. "Then We Can Try Again"
3. "Everybody's Got the Right to Love"
4. "Wait a Minute Before You Leave Me"
5. "You Move Me"
6. "But I Love You More"
7. "I Got Hurt (Trying to Be the Only Girl in Your Life)"
8. "Baby Baby"
9. "Take a Closer Look at Me"
10. "Then I Met You"
11. "Bill, When are You Coming Back"
12. "The Loving Country"
  - Tracks 1 - 12: "Right On" (1970)
13. "Together We Can Make Such Sweet Music" (Martin Coleman, Richard Drapkin)
14. "Stoned Love" (Yennik Samoht, Frank Wilson)
15. "It's Time to Break Down" (Ellean Hendley, Wilson)
16. "Bridge Over Troubled Water" (Paul Simon)
17. "I Wish I Were Your Mirror"
18. "Come Together" (John Lennon, Paul McCartney)
19. "Love the One Your With"
20. "Is There a Place (In His Heart for Me)"
21. "Na Na Hey Hey (Kiss Him Goodbye)" (Paul Leka, Dale Frashuer, Gary DeCarlo)
22. "Shine on Me"
23. "Thank Him for Today" (Vincient DiMarco, Wilson)
  - Tracks 13 - 23: "New Ways But Love Stays" (1970)

CD 2

1. "This Is the Story"
2. "Nathan Jones"
3. "Here Comes the Sunrise"
4. "Love It Came to Me This Time"
5. "Johnny Raven"
6. "Have I Lost You"
7. "Time and Love"
8. "Touch"
9. "Happy (Is a Bumpy Road)"
10. "It's So Hard for Me to Say Goodbye"
  - Tracks 1 - 10: "Touch" (1971)
11. "Tears Left Over" (Leonard Caston, Jr., Nickolas Ashford) - 3:37
12. "Eleanor Rigby" (John Lennon, Paul McCartney) - 2:30
13. "I Ain't Got the Love of the One I Love" (Nick Zesses, Dino Fekaris) - 3:19
14. "Can't Get You Out of My Mind" (Ashford, Valerie Simpson) - 2:59
15. "Take a Look Inside" (McMurray, Brenda Wane, Steve Bowden) - 3:36
16. "Still Water (Love)" (Wilson, Smokey Robinson) - 2:56
17. "Take Your Dreams Back" (Cosby, Dean, Glover) - 3:18
18. "I Don't Want to Own You (I Just Want to Love You)" (R. Dean Taylor, Mike Valvano) - 2:55
19. "Chained to Yesterday" (Beatrice Verdi, Sawyer, Cosby) - 3:08
20. "If I Were Your Woman" (Jones, Sawyer, McMurray) - 2:46
21. "I Ain't That Easy to Lose" (Jones, Sawyer) - 3:51
22. "And I Thought You Loved Me" (Zesses, Fekaris) - 4:18
23. "It's Too Late" (Carole King, Toni Stern) - 4:27
  - Tracks 11 - 23: "Promises Kept" (1971)
24. "May His Love Shine Forever" - 3:13
  - From Rock Gospel, The Key to the Kingdom (1971)

CD 3

1. "Your Wonderful Sweet, Sweet Love" (Smokey Robinson)
2. "Floy Joy" (Robinson)
3. "A Heart Like Mine" (Robinson, Ronald White)
4. "Over and Over" (Robinson)
5. "Precious Little Things" (Robinson, Marvin Tarplin, Pam Moffett)
6. "Now The Bitter, Now The Sweet" (Robinson, Cecil Franklin)
7. "Automatically Sunshine" (Robinson)
8. "The Wisdom of Time" (Robinson, Moffett, Clifford Burston)
9. "Oh Be My Love" (Robinson, Warren Moore)
  - "Floy Joy" (1972)
10. "I Guess I'll Miss The Man" (Stephen Schwartz)
11. "5:30 Plane" (Jimmy Webb)
12. "Tossin' & Turnin'" (Bobby Lewis, Malou Rene)
13. "When Can Brown Begin?" (Webb)
14. "Beyond Myself" (Webb)
15. "Silent Voices" (Elio Isola)
16. "All I Want" (Joni Mitchell)
17. "Once In The Morning" (Webb)
18. "I Keep It Hid" (Webb)
19. "Paradise" (Harry Nilsson)
20. "Cheap Lovin'" (Webb)
  - "The Supremes Produced and Arranged by Jimmy Webb" (1972 - with Lynda Laurence replacing Cindy Birdsong.)
21. "Bad Weather" (Stevie Wonder, Ira Tucker) - 3:02
22. "Love Train" (Kenneth Gamble, Leon Huff) - 3:2
  - 1973 non-album tracks (with Lynda Laurence replacing Cindy Birdsong.)

== Personnel ==
- Jean Terrell: lead- and background vocals
- Mary Wilson: lead- and background vocals
- Cindy Birdsong: background vocals
- Lynda Laurence: background vocals on "Produced and Arranged by Jimmy Webb", "Love Train" and "Bad Weather"
