= The Supremes: At Their Best =

At Their Best

Compilation album by The Supremes
- Released: 30 June 1978 (US)
- Recorded: 1970–1976
- Genre: R&B, pop, soul, funk, disco
- Label: Motown
- Producer: Frank Wilson; Smokey Robinson; Jimmy Webb; Edward Holland, Jr. Brian Holland

The Supremes chronology
20 Golden Greats (1977)	At Their Best (1978)	20 Greatest Hits (1979)

Professional ratings
Review scores
Source	Rating
Allmusic	3/5 stars
Christgau's Record Guide	C+
Record Mirror	3/5 stars

At Their Best is a 1978 album by The Supremes. It includes most of their singles from 1970 through 1976 and featured, at the time, two never-before released songs: "The Sha-La Bandit" and "Love Train". It was released first in the United Kingdom in February 1978, including 14 tracks. It was later released in the US in June 1978, with some of the tracks removed and the track order amended.

In 2006, the album was reissued as part of Universal's 2-CD "The Supremes: Gold" compilation of Motown hits albums, including Greatest Hits, and Greatest Hits Vol. 3.

== UK Track listings ==
=== Side one ===
1. "Stoned Love" (2:58)
2. "I'm Gonna Let My Heart Do the Walking" (3:08)
3. "Floy Joy" (2:31)
4. "Nathan Jones" (3:01)
5. "Everybody's Got the Right to Love" (2:44)
6. "High Energy" (4:13)
7. "Automatically Sunshine" (3:08)

=== Side two ===
1. "Up the Ladder to the Roof" (3:14)
2. "You're My Driving Wheel" (3:19)
3. "Bad Weather" (3:01)
4. "Love Train" (3:20)
5. "The Sha-La Bandit" (3:40)
6. "He's My Man" (3:02)
7. "You're What's Missing in My Life" (3:58)

== US Track listings ==
=== Side one ===
1. "Stoned Love" (2:58)
2. "I'm Gonna Let My Heart Do the Walking" (3:08)
3. "Floy Joy" (2:31)
4. "Nathan Jones" (3:01)
5. "The Sha-La Bandit" (3:40)

=== Side two ===
1. "Up the Ladder to the Roof" (3:14)
2. "You're My Driving Wheel" (3:19)
3. "Everybody's Got the Right to Love" (2:44)
4. "Bad Weather" (3:01)
5. "Love Train" (3:20)

== Personnel ==
- Jean Terrell – lead and background vocals
- Mary Wilson – lead and background vocals
- Scherrie Payne – lead and background vocals
- Cindy Birdsong – background vocals
- Lynda Laurence – background vocals
- Susaye Greene – background vocals
