= Farewell (The Supremes album) =

Live album by Diana Ross & the Supremes
- Released: April 13, 1970
- Recorded: New Frontier Hotel and Casino, January 14, 1970, 11:54 p.m. – 1:00 a.m.
- Genres: Pop, soul
- Length: 77:40
- Labels: Motown; MS2-708
- Producer: Deke Richards

Diana Ross & the Supremes chronology
Greatest Hits Vol. 3 (1969)	Farewell (1970)	Right On (1970)

Alternative cover
- 1992 reissue cover, Captured Live on Stage!.

Professional ratings
Review scores
Source	Rating
AllMusic	4/5 stars

Farewell is a 1970 live album by Diana Ross & the Supremes. The album was recorded over the course of the group's final engagement together at the New Frontier Hotel and Casino in Las Vegas, Nevada, including the final night on January 14, 1970. The show marked Diana Ross' penultimate performance with fellow Supremes members Mary Wilson and Cindy Birdsong. At the conclusion of the show, new Supremes lead singer Jean Terrell was brought onstage and introduced to the audience.

== History ==
The material performed in the show was a mix of popular Supremes hits, cover songs, and Broadway showtunes. During the extended twenty-minute rendition of "Let The Sunshine In", Diana Ross walked through the audience and let some of the guests sing the title-chorus of the song; some of these guests included Smokey Robinson and his wife Claudette, Dick Clark, Lou Rawls, Steve Allen, Bill Russell and Marvin Gaye.

The live album was issued as a two-LP deluxe edition box set, produced by Deke Richards. The album was reissued as a gatefold two-LP set under the title Captured Live on Stage! in 1982, and as a two-disc compact disc reissue Captured Live on Stage!, in 1992.

According to Mary Wilson, Berry Gordy had last-minute reservations about having Terrell replace Ross, as she was more independent and headstrong than Ross had been. Gordy called Wilson during the early morning following the final show, and informed her that he was going to instead replace Ross with his original choice for a Ross replacement, Syreeta Wright.

Terrell, Wilson, and Cindy Birdsong had already recorded most of the material for the first post-Ross Supremes album, Right On, and Terrell had just been publicly introduced as the newest Supreme, so Wilson refused and threatened to quit if Gordy dropped Terrell. Gordy angrily replied he would "wash his hands of the group", and hung up the telephone receiver.

The Supremes enjoyed a number of hits following Ross' departure, including "Up the Ladder to the Roof", "Stoned Love", "River Deep – Mountain High" (with The Four Tops), "Nathan Jones", "Floy Joy", "Automatically Sunshine", and their last Top 40 Billboard Pop Chart hit in 1976, "I'm Gonna Let My Heart Do the Walking"—although promotion and backing from Motown decreased. The Supremes carried on through the middle of the decade, briefly enjoying disco hits, concert touring, and television appearances, before finally disbanding officially in 1977.

== Track listing ==
=== LP/disc one ===
==== Side one ====
1. "TCB" (Bill Angelos, Buz Kohan)
2. Medley:
  1. "Stop! In the Name of Love"
  2. "Come See About Me"
  3. "My World Is Empty Without You"
  4. "Baby Love"
3. Medley:
  1. "The Lady Is a Tramp"
  2. "Let's Get Away From It All"
4. Monologue - Diana Ross
5. "Love Is Here and Now You're Gone"
6. "I'm Gonna Make You Love Me"
7. Monologue - Mary Wilson
8. "Can't Take My Eyes Off You" - Mary Wilson on Lead
9. Dialogue - Diana Ross & Mary Wilson
10. "Reflections"

==== Side two ====
1. "My Man"
2. "Didn't We"
3. "It's Alright With Me" (Cole Porter)
4. "Big Spender"
5. "Falling In Love with Love" - Mary Wilson on Lead
6. "Love Child"
7. Monologue - Diana Ross

=== LP/disc two ===
==== Side three ====
1. Monologue - Diana Ross
2. "Aquarius/Let the Sunshine In (The Flesh Failures)"

==== Side four ====
1. Monologue - Diana Ross
2. "The Impossible Dream"
3. Monologue - Diana Ross
4. "Someday We'll Be Together"
5. Closing Dialogue - Diana Ross & the Supremes

== Personnel ==
- Diana Ross - lead and background vocals
- Mary Wilson - lead and background vocals
- Cindy Birdsong - background vocals
- Gil Askey - musical direction, arrangements, orchestra conductor

Technical

- Wally Heider - engineering
- John Stronach - engineering
- Berry Gordy - executive producer
- Deke Richards - album producer
- Deke Richard and Kevin Kim - art direction
- Kevin Kim - photography, design
- Ivy Hill - lithography

== Charts ==
Chart (1970)	Peak position
Canada Top Albums/CDs (RPM)	28
US Billboard 200	46
US Top R&B/Hip-Hop Albums (Billboard)	31
