= Your Wonderful, Sweet Sweet Love =

- 1972 German single

Single by The Supremes

from the album Floy Joy
- B-side: "The Wisdom of Time"
- Released: July 11, 1972
- Recorded: 1972, Hitsville U.S.A.
- Genre: Pop, soul
- Length: 3:00 (album/single version)
- Label: Motown
- Songwriter: Smokey Robinson
- Producer: Smokey Robinson

The Supremes singles chronology
"Without the One You Love" (1972)	"Your Wonderful, Sweet Sweet Love" (1972)	"I Guess I'll Miss the Man" (1972)

Floy Joy track listing
- 9 tracks Side one: 1. "Your Wonderful, Sweet Sweet Love"; 2. "Floy Joy"; 3. "A Heart Like Mine"; 4. "Over and Over"; 5. "Precious Little Things"; Side two: 6. "Now The Bitter, Now The Sweet"; 7. "Automatically Sunshine"; 8. "The Wisdom of Time"; 9. "Oh Be My Love"

"Your Wonderful, Sweet Sweet Love" is a song written by Smokey Robinson, recorded in October 1966 by Kim Weston. Her recording was not issued at the time as she left the label over a dispute over royalties in 1967. Weston's original version was first released in 2005.

The song was revisited and released as a single by Motown singing group The Supremes in 1972 as the third and final single from their popular album Floy Joy. On the soul chart the song peaked at number twenty-two, while on the Hot 100 it went to number fifty-nine.

== Personnel ==
- Lead vocals by Jean Terrell
- Background vocals by Mary Wilson and Cindy Birdsong
- Ad Libs by Smokey Robinson
- Additional vocals by The Andantes
- Produced and written by Smokey Robinson

== Charts ==
Chart (1972)	Peak position
Canada Top Singles (RPM)	81
US Billboard Hot 100	59
US Hot R&B/Hip-Hop Songs (Billboard)	22
US Cashbox Top 100	70
US Cashbox R&B	51
US Record World Singles	72
