= You Gotta Have Love in Your Heart =

- 1971 German 7" single

Single by The Supremes & The Four Tops

from the album The Return of the Magnificent 7
- B-side: "I'm Glad About It"
- Released: 1971
- Genre: R&B, soul
- Length: 2:49 (album/single version)
- Label: Motown
- Songwriters: Nick Zesses, Dino Fekaris

The Supremes & The Four Tops singles chronology
"Nathan Jones" (1971)	"You Gotta Have Love in Your Heart" (1971)	"Touch" (1971)

“You Gotta Have Love in Your Heart” is a duet single between Motown singing groups The Supremes and the Four Tops, released as a single from their The Return of the Magnificent 7 album in 1971. The single became a modest charter peaking at #55 on the U.S. Billboard Hot 100 chart and #41 on the U.S. Billboard R&B Singles Chart. The single fared better in the UK, where it reached #25 in the official top 50 single chart. Lead vocals were by the groups' respective lead singers Jean Terrell and Levi Stubbs.

== Critical reception ==
Cashbox published in their July 17, 1976 issue, 'The electrifying combination that made the "Magnificent Seven" is about to return with an album previewed by this delightful rock outing. Side has the power of a cleanly produced dance track and some outstanding vocal fireworks to assure monster receptions. Flip: no info.'

== Personnel ==
- Lead vocals by Jean Terrell and Levi Stubbs
- Background vocals by Mary Wilson, Cindy Birdsong, Abdul "Duke" Fakir, Lawrence Payton and Renaldo "Obie" Benson
- Instrumentation by Los Angeles studio musicians

== Charts ==
Chart (1971)	Peak position
UK Singles (OCC)	25
US Billboard Hot 100	55
US Hot R&B/Hip-Hop Songs (Billboard)	41
US Cashbox Top 100	51
US Cashbox R&B	26
US Record World Singles	46
US Record World R&B Singles	17
