= I Had to Fall in Love =

Studio album by Jean Terrell
- Released: 1978
- Recorded: 1978
- Studios: Total Experience Recording Studios (Hollywood, California)
- Genre: Soul
- Length: 34:01
- Label: A&M
- Producer: Bobby Martin

Professional ratings
Review scores
Source	Rating
AllMusic	3/5 stars

I Had to Fall in Love was the 1978 debut and only solo album released by former Supremes lead singer Jean Terrell, on the A&M label.

== Track listing ==
1. "Don't Stop Reaching for the Top" (Jimmie Davis, Jeffrey Osborne) - (4:13)
2. "No One Like My Baby" (Fred Bliffert) - (3:45)
3. "Rising Cost of Love" (Bobby Martin, Len Ron Hanks, Zane Grey) - (3:34)
4. "Change Up" (Len Ron Hanks, Zane Grey) - (5:00)
5. "How Can You Live (Without Love)" (Len Ron Hanks, Zane Grey) - (3:21)
6. "I Had to Fall in Love" (Benny Gallagher, Graham Lyle) - (4:16)
7. "That's the Way Love Grows" (Frank McDonald, Chris Rae, Gerry Shury, Ron Roker) - (3:30)
8. "You've Been So Good for Me" (Len Ron Hanks, Zane Grey) - (4:23)
9. "No Limit" (Len Ron Hanks, Zane Grey) - (3:19)

== Personnel ==
Adapted from liner notes.

=== Singers ===
- Jean Terrell – lead vocals
- Sherlie Matthews, Venetta Fields, Clydie King, Lynda Laurence – backing vocals

=== Musicians ===
- Scotty Harris, Melvin Webb, James Gadson – drums
- Danny Whatley, Harry E. Davis, Tony Newton – bass guitar
- Benorce Blackman, Paul Flaherty, Melvin "Wah Wah" Watson, Johnny McGhee – guitar
- Leo Ron Hanks – keyboards, acoustic piano
- Jimmie Davis, Billy Osborne – keyboards
- Jeffrey Osborne, Eddie "Bongo" Brown – percussion
- Sylvester Rivers – piano, Fender Rhodes
- Fred Jackson – alto saxophone

=== Production credits ===
- Produced by Bobby Martin for Bobby Martin Productions
- Recorded and Mixed at Total Experience Recording Studios, Hollywood
- Douglas Greaves – engineering
- Norman Seeff – photography
