= The Magnificent 7 (album) =

Studio album by the Supremes and the Four Tops
- Released: September 1970
- Recorded: 1970
- Genres: Soul, R&B
- Label: Motown
- Producers: Frank Wilson, Duke Browner, Clay McMurray, Nickolas Ashford & Valerie Simpson

The Supremes chronology
Right On (1970)	The Magnificent 7 (1970)	New Ways but Love Stays (1970)

The Four Tops chronology
Changing Times (1970)	The Magnificent 7 (1970)	The Return of the Magnificent Seven (1971)

Singles from The Magnificent 7
- 1. "Reach Out and Touch (Somebody's Hand)" Released: April 6, 1970; 2. "River Deep, Mountain High"/"Together We Can Make Such Sweet Music" Released: November 5, 1970

The Magnificent 7 is a collaborative album combining Motown's premier vocal groups, the Supremes and the Four Tops. Issued by Motown in 1970, it followed two collaborative albums the Supremes did with the Temptations in the late 1960s. The album featured their hit cover of Ike & Tina Turner's "River Deep – Mountain High", which reached number 14 on the US Billboard Hot 100 singles chart. In the UK, the album peaked at number 6. In December 1971, Billboard reported UK album sales of 30,000 copies.

== Critical reception ==
Professional ratings
Review scores
Source	Rating
AllMusic	3.5/5 stars
Cashbox	(Favorable)
The Encyclopedia of Popular Music	4/5 stars
The Rolling Stone Album Guide	3/5 stars

Cashbox published, 'The Supremes and Four Tops have been making music for a long time, but never as a single group. Now, for the first time, the two super groups unite to deliver what must be called the most soulful and energetic package of the year. Their voices and musical styles blend together as if they have always been a part of the same group. "Knock On My Door," "For Your Love," "Reach Out And Touch (somebody's hand)," "Everyday People," and "Together We Can Make Such Sweet Music," are only a few of the cuts that will make this classic LP a chart topper.'

== Track listing ==
Side one

1. "Knock on My Door" (Joe Hinton, Patti Jerome) – 2:15
2. "For Your Love" (Ed Townsend) – 2:54
3. "Without the One You Love" (Lamont Dozier, Brian Holland) – 3:10
4. "Reach Out and Touch (Somebody's Hand)" (Nickolas Ashford, Valerie Simpson) – 4:20
5. "Stoned Soul Picnic" (Laura Nyro) – 3:10
6. "Baby (You've Got What It Takes)" (Clyde Otis, Murray Stein) – 2:59

Side two

1. "River Deep – Mountain High" (Jeff Barry, Ellie Greenwich, Phil Spector) – 4:52
2. "Ain't Nothing Like the Real Thing" (Nickolas Ashford, Valerie Simpson) – 2:29
3. "Everyday People" (Sylvester Stewart) – 2:52
4. "It's Got to Be a Miracle (This Thing Called Love)" (Vernon Bullock, Sylvia Moy, William "Mickey" Stevenson) – 3:55
5. "Taste of Honey" (Ric Marlow, Bobby Scott) – 2:57
6. "Together We Can Make Such Sweet Music" (Martin Coleman, Richard Drapkin) – 2:59

== Personnel ==
The Supremes

- Jean Terrell – lead and 1st soprano vocals
- Mary Wilson – alto vocals
- Cindy Birdsong – 2nd soprano vocals

The Four Tops

- Levi Stubbs – lead baritone vocals
- Abdul "Duke" Fakir – first tenor vocals
- Lawrence Payton – second tenor vocals
- Renaldo "Obie" Benson – bass vocals

Technical personnel

- Frank Wilson – executive producer
- Duke Browner – producer (tracks 1A, 2A, 5B, 6B)
- Clay McMurray – producer (tracks 3A, 6A, 3B, 4B)
- Nickolas Ashford – producer (tracks 4A, 5A, 1B, 2B)
- Valerie Simpson – producer (tracks 4A, 5A, 1B, 2B)
- The Funk Brothers – instrumentation
- David Van DePitte, Paul Riser – arrangers

== Charts ==
Chart (1971)	Peak position
Canada Top Albums/CDs (RPM)	73
UK Albums (Official Charts)	6
US Billboard 200	116
US Top R&B/Hip-Hop Albums (Billboard)	15
US Cashbox Top 100	72
