= The Return of the Magnificent Seven =

Studio album by the Supremes and the Four Tops
- Released: July 13, 1971
- Recorded: 1970
- Genre: Soul
- Label: Motown
- Producer: Frank Wilson

The Supremes chronology
New Ways but Love Stays (1970)	The Return of the Magnificent Seven (1971)	Touch (1971)

The Four Tops chronology
The Magnificent 7 (1970)	The Return of the Magnificent Seven (1971)	Dynamite (1971)

The Return of the Magnificent Seven is the second collaborative album between Motown label-mates the Supremes and Four Tops, released in 1971.

== Critical reception ==
Professional ratings
Review scores
Source	Rating
AllMusic	4/5 stars
Cashbox	(Favorable)
The Encyclopedia of Popular Music	2/5 stars

In a contemporary review Cashbox published:

'What was that you were saying about supergroups and supersessions? Give a listen to what may be the last word on the subjects. Joining together of these two dynamic groups results in an LP which is chock full of excitement and charm. "You Gotta Have Love In Your Heart" kicks the set off and it's non-stop action all, the way through as the seven take on a bevy of new songs, along with the standard "Call Me." Should find a ready following among fans of both groups.'

== Track listing ==
1. "You Gotta Have Love in Your Heart" (Nick Zesses, Dino Fekaris)
2. "I Wonder Where We're Going" (Tom Baird)
3. "Call Me" (Tony Hatch)
4. "One More Bridge to Cross" (Nickolas Ashford, Valerie Simpson)
5. "If You Could See Me Now" (Janie Bradford, Joe Hinton, Henry Cosby)
6. "I'll Try Not to Cry" (Nick Zesses, Dino Fekaris)
7. "I'm Glad About It" (Nickolas Ashford, Valerie Simpson)
8. "Let's Make Love Now" (Nick Zesses, Dino Fekaris)
9. "I Can't Believe You Love Me" (Harvey Fuqua, Johnny Bristol)
10. "Where Would I Be Without You Baby" (Clarence McMurray, Martin Coleman)
11. "What Do You Have to Do (To Stay on the Right Side of Love)" (Pam Sawyer, Leon Ware)

== Personnel ==
- Jean Terrell - vocals
- Mary Wilson - vocals
- Cindy Birdsong - vocals
- Levi Stubbs - vocals
- Abdul "Duke" Fakir - vocals
- Lawrence Payton - vocals
- Renaldo "Obie" Benson - vocals
- Frank Wilson - producer, executive producer
- The Funk Brothers - instrumentation
- David Van DePitte, Henry Cosby, Paul Riser, Tom Baird - arrangers

== Chart history ==
Chart (1971)	Peak position
US Billboard 200	154
US Top R&B/Hip-Hop Albums (Billboard)	18
US Record World	72
US Record World R&B	20
