= New Ways but Love Stays =

New Ways But Love Stays

Studio album by the Supremes
- Released: October 1970
- Recorded: 1970
- Genre: Soul, pop
- Length: 43:46
- Label: Motown; MS 720
- Producer: Frank Wilson

The Supremes chronology
The Magnificent 7 (1970)	New Ways But Love Stays (1970)	The Return of the Magnificent Seven (1971)

Singles from New Ways but Love Stays
- 1. "Stoned Love" Released: October 15, 1970

New Ways But Love Stays is the 2nd studio album by the Jean Terrell-led Supremes. Building on the foundation of the group's first LP, Right On, New Ways was produced by Frank Wilson and features The Supremes' most successful single with Terrell, "Stoned Love".

== Critical reception ==
Professional ratings
Review scores
Source	Rating
AllMusic	3/5 stars
Cashbox	(Favorable)
The Encyclopedia of Popular Music	3/5 stars
The Rolling Stone Album Guide	3/5 stars

The Rolling Stone Album Guide praised the "magnificent" "Stoned Love", before lamenting the group's slide into "mere professionalism." A Cashbox reviewer wrote: 'An apt title indeed for this new Supremes outing showcasing some of Motown's newer writers. And there's been a subtle change in the group along much the same lines as the Temps. Songs are longer with a shift in emphasis to arranging of the instrumental parts of the songs. No longer is the band just a backing group but, again as with the Temps, has become a totally integrated entity along with the girls so that the Supremes now are not simply a trio but a twenty piece group. This then is Motown's key to chart success, never stand still. "Stoned Love," "It's Time To Break Down," and "Together We Can Make Such Sweet Music" are perfect examples. Paul and Artie's "Bridge" is given the best treatment since the original. Super LP!' Robert Hilburn wrote in his syndicated record review column that 'Without Miss Ross, the Supremes still have a pleasant sound, but not really an impressive or commanding one.'

== Covers ==
On New Ways But Love Stays, the Supremes covered Simon & Garfunkel's "Bridge Over Troubled Water", The Beatles' "Come Together, Steam's "Na Na Hey Hey (Kiss Him Goodbye)", The Four Tops' "I Wish I Were Your Mirror", and The Spinners' "Together We Can Make Such Sweet Music".

== Track listing ==
Side one

1. "Together We Can Make Such Sweet Music" (Martin Coleman, Richard Drapkin)
2. "Stoned Love" (Yennik Samoht, Frank Wilson)
3. "It's Time to Break Down" (Ellean Hendley, Wilson)
4. "Bridge Over Troubled Water" (Paul Simon)
5. "I Wish I Were Your Mirror" (Pam Sawyer, Frank Wilson)

Side two

1. "Come Together" (John Lennon, Paul McCartney)
2. "Is There a Place (In His Heart for Me)" (Clay McMurray, Martin Coleman)
3. "Na Na Hey Hey Kiss Him Goodbye" (Gary DeCarlo, Dale Frashuer, Paul Leka)
4. "Shine on Me" (Frank Wilson)
5. "Thank Him for Today" (Vincent DiMirco)

Bonus tracks

1. "Love the One You're With" (Stephen Stills) (CD bonus track, position # 7, it does not appear on the original LP)

== Personnel ==
- Jean Terrell – lead vocals and background vocals
- Mary Wilson – lead and background vocals
- Cindy Birdsong – lead and background vocals
- The Andantes – additional background vocals

Production

- Frank Wilson – producer except "Is There A Place"
- Clay McMurray – producer on "Is There A Place"

== Charts ==
Chart (1970)	Peak position
US Billboard 200	68
US Top R&B/Hip-Hop Albums (Billboard)	12
US Cashbox Top 100	59
