= Everybody's Got the Right to Love =

Single by The Supremes

from the album Right On
- B-side: "But I Love You More"
- Released: June 25, 1970
- Recorded: 1970, Golden World Studios, Detroit, Michigan
- Genre: R&B, Pop
- Length: 2:37 (album/single version)
- Label: Motown
- Songwriter: Lou Stallman
- Producer: Frank Wilson

The Supremes singles chronology
"Why (Must We Fall in Love) (with The Temptations)" (1970)	"Everybody's Got the Right to Love" (1970)	"Stoned Love" (1970)

Right On track listing
- 12 tracks Side one: 1. "Up the Ladder to the Roof"; 2. "Then We Can Try Again"; 3. "Everybody's Got the Right to Love"; 4. "Wait a Minute Before You Leave Me"; 5. "You Move Me"; 6. "But I Love You More"; Side two: 7. "I Got Hurt (Trying to Be the Only Girl in Your Life)"; 8. "Baby Baby"; 9. "Take a Closer Look at Me"; 10. "Then I Met You"; 11. "Bill, When are You Coming Back"; 12. "The Loving Country"

"Everybody's Got the Right to Love" is a socially conscious–inspired pop song written by Lou Stallman, produced by Frank Wilson and released as a single in 1970 by Motown group The Supremes, who took the song into the top forty in mid-1970 following the release of "Up the Ladder to the Roof".

== Song information ==
The songs features new Supremes lead singer Jean Terrell, with backup vocals by original Supreme Mary Wilson and more recent member Cindy Birdsong. The lyrics describe how everyone should be able to love, saying "without love you can't survive". This is the first song that showcases the group's vocals as a group, which had not been done since the late 1960s. At the start of the song the trio sings, "..Say I/Say Yeah..", in harmony. There are at least three different versions of the song. One appears on the Supremes' "70's Greatest Hits & Rare Classics" and the other on The Supremes (2000 album).

== Charts ==
The song became a top 30 hit for the Supremes peaking at number 21 on the Billboard Hot 100 and reaching number 11 on the R&B chart. "Everybody's Got the Right to Love' was the second of eight top forty singles the Supremes scored after the departure of Diana Ross. It did not make the top 50 in the UK Singles Chart, interrupting an otherwise successful run of top ten hits for the group in Britain.

=== Weekly charts ===
Chart (1971)	Peak position
Canada Top Singles (RPM)	14
Netherlands (Dutch Top 40 Tipparade)	18
US Billboard Hot 100	21
US Hot R&B/Hip-Hop Songs (Billboard)	11
US Adult Contemporary (Billboard)	29
US Cashbox Top 100	14
US Cashbox R&B	7
US Record World 100 Top Pops	13
US Record World Top 50 R&B	5

=== Year-end charts ===
Chart (1970)	Rank
US Cashbox R&B	79

== Personnel ==
- Lead vocals by Jean Terrell
- Background vocals by Jean Terrell, Mary Wilson and Cindy Birdsong
- Instrumentation by The Funk Brothers
