= Touch (The Supremes song) =

- 1971 German single

Single by The Supremes

from the album Touch
- B-side: "It's So Hard for Me to Say Good-bye"
- Released: September 7, 1971
- Recorded: 1971
- Genre: Soul
- Length: 3:41 (album version); 2:57 (single version)
- Label: Motown
- Songwriters: Pam Sawyer; Frank Wilson
- Producer: Frank Wilson

The Supremes singles chronology
| "You Gotta Have Love in Your Heart" (1971) | "Touch" (1971) | "Floy Joy" (1971) |

Touch track listing
- 10 tracks Side one: 1. "This Is the Story"; 2. "Nathan Jones"; 3. "Here Comes the Sunrise"; 4. "Love It Came to Me This Time"; 5. "Johnny Raven"; Side two: 6. "Have I Lost You"; 7. "Time and Love"; 8. "Touch"; 9. "Happy (Is a Bumpy Road)"; 10. "It's So Hard for Me to Say Goodbye"

"Touch" is a soft ballad written by Pamela Sawyer and Frank Wilson, who also produced it as a single for Motown recording group The Supremes, who issued it as a single in 1971.

It was the title track of the group's fourteenth studio album of the same name. It was the first single in which sole original Supremes member Mary Wilson had a lead vocal on a released Supremes single. Cindy Birdsong also sings lead toward the end of the song.

The single, upon release, peaked at number 71 on the Billboard Hot 100 becoming the first post-Diana Ross Supremes song to miss the Top 40. It was also the last single in which Frank Wilson would serve as producer.

This single would later be covered two years later by The Jackson 5 as the b-side to their single "Hallelujah Day", with almost no changes to the lyrics. Fellow Motown group The Originals also cut a version for their 1975 album Communique.

== Critical reception ==
Cashbox published 'Title track from group's latest LP presents an electrifying ballad surrounded by an outstanding musical showcase and all ready for its climb to the top of the r&b and pop charts. Song is the kind that will be recorded by many other artists in the future.'

== Personnel ==
=== The Supremes version ===
- Lead and background vocals by Jean Terrell, Mary Wilson, and Cindy Birdsong
- Additional background vocals by The Blackberries
- Produced by Frank Wilson
- Instrumentation by The Funk Brothers

=== Jackson 5 version ===
- Lead vocals by Michael Jackson and Jermaine Jackson
- Background vocals by Jackie Jackson, Tito Jackson and Marlon Jackson
- Produced by Hal Davis
- Instrumentation by various Los Angeles session musicians

== Charts ==
=== The Supremes version ===
| Chart (1971) | Peak position |
|---|---|
| Canada Top Singles (RPM) | 71 |
| US Billboard Hot 100 | 71 |
| US Cashbox Top 100 | 53 |
| US Record World Singles | 61 |
