= Dynamite (The Supremes and the Four Tops album) =

Studio album by The Supremes and the Four Tops
- Released: December 1971
- Recorded: 1971
- Genre: Soul
- Label: Motown
- Producer: Johnny Bristol; Joe Hinton; Bobby Taylor; Frank Wilson

The Supremes chronology
Touch (1971)	Dynamite (1971)	Floy Joy (1972)

The Four Tops chronology
The Return of the Magnificent Seven (1971)	Dynamite (1971)	Nature Planned It (1972)

Dynamite is the third and last collaborative album between labelmates The Supremes and The Four Tops, released on the Motown label in 1971. In the US, Dynamite peaked at the lower hundreds of the Billboard Top 200. The album fared better on the Billboard R&B charts, peaking at 21. It includes several covers of previous hits and a few Motown originals.

Professional ratings
Review scores
Source	Rating
AllMusic	3/5 stars
The Encyclopedia of Popular Music	3/5 stars

== Track listing ==
Side One

1. "It's Impossible" (Armando Manzanero, Sid Wayne)
  - Produced by Frank Wilson and Bobby Taylor
2. "The Bigger You Love (The Harder You Fall)" (Jerry Marcellino, Mel Larson)
  - Produced by Frank Wilson and Bobby Taylor
3. "Hello Stranger" (Barbara Lewis)
  - Produced by Frank Wilson and Bobby Taylor
4. "Love the One You're With" (Stephen Stills)
  - Produced by Frank Wilson and Bobby Taylor
5. "Good Lovin' Ain't Easy to Come By" (Nickolas Ashford, Valerie Simpson)
  - Produced by Bobby Taylor

Side Two

1. "Melodie" (Deke Richards, Jerry Marcellino, Mel Larson)
  - Produced by Frank Wilson and Bobby Taylor
2. "If" (David Gates)
  - Produced by Bobby Taylor
3. "If I Could Build My Whole World Around You" (Harvey Fuqua, Johnny Bristol, Vernon Bullock)
  - Produced by Johnny Bristol
4. "Don't Let Me Lose This Dream" (Aretha Franklin, Ted White)
  - Produced by Joe Hinton
5. "Do You Love Me Just a Little, Honey" (Gladys Knight, Harvey Fuqua, Johnny Bristol, Vernon Bullock)
  - Produced by Johnny Bristol

== Personnel ==
- The Supremes (Jean Terrell, Mary Wilson, Cindy Birdsong), The Four Tops (Levi Stubbs, Duke Fakir, Obie Benson, Lawrence Payton) – vocals
- David Van DePitte, Gene Page, H.B. Barnum, Robert White – arrangers
- Curtis McNair – art direction
- Warren Linn – illustration
- Tom Schlesinger – graphics

Instruments:

- Bass - Wilton Felder and Ron Brown
- Guitars - Louie Shelton, David T. Walker, Ben Benay and Don Peake
- Keyboards/Piano - Joe Sample, Clarence Macdonald and Don Randi
- Drums - Paul Humphrey, Gene Pello and Ed Greene
- Percussion - King Errison and Bobbye Hall-Porter
- Strings - Sidney Sharp and local Los Angeles area string players

== Chart history ==
Chart (1971)	Peak position
US Billboard 200	160
US Top R&B/Hip-Hop Albums (Billboard)	21
US Cashbox Top 100	134
US Record World R&B	21
