= Floy Joy (album) =

Studio album by the Supremes
- Released: May 1972
- Recorded: 1971–1972
- Genres: Pop, soul
- Length: 29:33
- Label: Motown
- Producer: Smokey Robinson

The Supremes chronology
Dynamite (1971)	Floy Joy (1972)	The Supremes Produced and Arranged by Jimmy Webb (1972)

Singles from Floy Joy
- 1. "Floy Joy" Released: December 1, 1971; 2. "Automatically Sunshine" Released: April 11, 1972; 3. "Your Wonderful, Sweet Sweet Love" Released: July 11, 1972

Professional ratings
Review scores
Source	Rating
AllMusic	3/5 stars
Christgau's Record Guide	B+
The Encyclopedia of Popular Music	3/5 stars
The Rolling Stone Album Guide	2.5/5 stars

Floy Joy is the twenty-fifth album released by the Supremes on the Motown label. This was the only Supremes album solely produced and arranged by Smokey Robinson and included the Top 20 hit, "Floy Joy" and the Top 40 hit, "Automatically Sunshine", both of which were Top 10 hits in the UK. Although Lynda Laurence appears on the cover of the LP, all vocals are that of Cindy Birdsong.

== Overview ==
The "Floy Joy" single was the Supremes' final Top 20 hit on the Billboard Hot 100, reaching number 9 in the UK. Its follow-ups, "Automatically Sunshine" and "Your Wonderful, Sweet Sweet Love" were not as successful, with "Automatically Sunshine" peaking at 37 on the Billboard Hot 100, 21 on the Top Soul Singles and being the group's final Top 10 hit in the U.K. at number 10. "Your Wonderful, Sweet Sweet Love" peaked at 59 on the Billboard Hot 100 and 21 on the Top Soul Singles.

== Track listing ==
=== Side one ===
1. "Your Wonderful, Sweet Sweet Love" (Smokey Robinson)
2. "Floy Joy" (Robinson)
3. "A Heart Like Mine" (Robinson, Ronald White)
4. "Over and Over" (Robinson)
5. "Precious Little Things" (Robinson, Marvin Tarplin, Pam Moffett)

=== Side two ===
1. "Now the Bitter, Now the Sweet" (Robinson, Cecil Franklin)
2. "Automatically Sunshine" (Robinson)
3. "The Wisdom of Time" (Robinson, Moffett, Clifford Burston)
4. "Oh Be My Love" (Robinson, Warren Moore)

== Personnel ==
- Jean Terrell, Mary Wilson, Cindy Birdsong – lead vocals, background vocals
- The Andantes (Louvain Demps, Jackie Hicks, Marlene Barrow) – additional background vocals
- William "Smokey" Robinson – producer
- Instrumentation by the Funk Brothers:
  - Jack Ashford, Jack Brokensha, Eddie "Bongo" Brown – percussion
  - Dennis Coffey, Robert White, Eddie Willis, Marvin Tarplin – guitars
  - Johnny Griffith, Earl Van Dyke – piano, keyboards
  - James Jamerson – bass guitar
  - Zachary Slater & Andrew Smith – drums
- Berry Gordy – executive producer
- Paul Riser – arranger
- Lynda Laurence – cover photo
- Jim Britt – photography

== Charts ==
=== Weekly charts ===
Chart (1972)	Peak position
US Billboard 200	54
US Top R&B/Hip-Hop Albums (Billboard)	12
US Record World	44
US Record World R&B	16

=== Year-end charts ===
Chart (1972)	Rank
US Top R&B/Hip-Hop Albums (Billboard)	46
