= Touch (The Supremes album) =

Studio album by the Supremes
- Released: June 1971
- Recorded: 1970–1971
- Genres: Pop; soul; R&B
- Length: 32:59
- Label: Motown
- Producer: Frank Wilson

The Supremes chronology
| The Return of the Magnificent 7 (1971) | Touch (1971) | Dynamite (with Four Tops) (1971) |

Singles from Touch
- 1. "Nathan Jones" Released: April 15, 1971; 2. "Touch" Released: September 7, 1971

Touch is the twenty-third studio album by the Supremes, released in the summer of 1971 on the Motown label. It was the third and final LP under the supervision of Frank Wilson, who had been the group's main producer since 1970, when Jean Terrell joined as lead singer. The album also marked the first Motown contributions by composer-producer Leonard Caston, Jr. and writer-lyricist Kathleen Wakefield: "Nathan Jones", a hit single sung by all three members, which was later recorded by Bananarama, and "Love It Came to Me This Time".

The album included contributions by several Motown artists and staff writers: "Here Comes the Sunrise" by actor-composer Clifton Davis (who had written "Never Can Say Goodbye" for The Jackson 5); Billy Page's "Johnny Raven" (recorded by Kiki Dee in her 1970 Motown album), and "Have I Lost You" by Pam Sawyer and Gloria Jones. Wilson also recorded Jean Terrell's vocals to the backing track of a cover of Laura Nyro's "Time and Love" that Bones Howe had produced for Diana Ross, but that was shelved and remained unreleased until 2002.

The other tracks were written by Sawyer and Wilson, including the opening and closing numbers, "This Is the Story" and "It's So Hard for Me to Say Goodbye"; "Happy (Is a Bumpy Road)", released as flip side of "Nathan Jones"; and the album title track, "Touch", the first charting Supremes single to feature lead vocals by both Terrell and founding member Mary Wilson. The song missed the US top 40, peaking at #71, and it was later recorded by The Jackson 5.

After this release, producer Frank Wilson went on to work with Motown artist Eddie Kendricks. This album also contained liner notes written by Elton John.

Despite the inclusion of a major hit record, the album generated disappointing sales.

== Critical reception ==
Professional ratings
Review scores
| Source | Rating |
|---|---|
| AllMusic | 3/5 stars |
| Cashbox | (Favorable) |
| Rolling Stone | (favorable) |

In a contemporary review Cashbox published:

'What has been left unsaid about the fantastic Supremes? They make all the right moves. One great track follows another on their latest entry in the album field. If we had to pick favorites, we'd choose the smooth "Love It Came To Me This Time" and the exuberant "Here Comes The Sunrise." Among the other treats: the girls' big hit of "Nathan Jones" and a fine rendition of the Laura Nyro number, "Time And Love." Ten tunes in all get the benefit of the Supremes' touch. Should be a major chart item.'

== Track listing ==
All lead vocals by Jean Terrell except where noted.

Side I
| No. | Title | Writer(s) | Length |
|---|---|---|---|
| 1. | "This Is the Story" | Frank Wilson, Pam Sawyer | 3:26 |
| 2. | "Nathan Jones" (lead singers: Jean Terrell, Mary Wilson, Cindy Birdsong) | Leonard Caston, Kathleen Wakefield | 3:02 |
| 3. | "Here Comes the Sunrise" | Clifton Davis | 2:47 |
| 4. | "Love It Came to Me This Time" | Caston, Wakefield | 3:21 |
| 5. | "Johnny Raven" | Billy Page | 3:19 |

Side II
| No. | Title | Writer(s) | Length |
|---|---|---|---|
| 6. | "Have I Lost You" | Gloria Jones, Sawyer | 2:44 |
| 7. | "Time and Love" | Laura Nyro | 4:07 |
| 8. | "Touch" (lead singers: Jean Terrell, Mary Wilson) | Wilson, Sawyer | 3:49 |
| 9. | "Happy (Is a Bumpy Road)" | Wilson, Sawyer | 3:08 |
| 10. | "It's So Hard for Me to Say Goodbye" | Wilson, Sawyer | 3:16 |

== Personnel ==
- Jean Terrell – lead and background vocals
- Mary Wilson – lead and background vocals
- Cindy Birdsong – background vocals
- The Blackberries – additional background vocals
- Frank Wilson – producer

== Charts ==
| Chart (1971) | Peak position |
|---|---|
| UK Albums (Official Charts) | 40 |
| US Billboard 200 | 85 |
| US Top R&B/Hip-Hop Albums (Billboard) | 6 |
| US Cashbox Top 100 | 78 |
| US Record World | 66 |
| US Record World R&B | 4 |
