= Right On (The Supremes album) =

Studio album by the Supremes
- Released: April 26, 1970
- Recorded: Summer 1969 – April 1970
- Genres: R&B, soul
- Length: 37:27
- Label: Motown
- Producers: Frank Wilson, Clay MacMurray, Ivy Jo Hunter

The Supremes chronology
Farewell (1970)	Right On (1970)	The Magnificent 7 (1970)

Singles from Right On
- 1. "Up the Ladder to the Roof" Released: February 16, 1970; 2. "Everybody's Got the Right to Love" Released: June 25, 1970

Right On is the nineteenth album by the Supremes, released in 1970 for the Motown label. It was the group's first album not to feature former lead singer Diana Ross who was replaced by Jean Terrell.

Frank Wilson, a former protégé of Motown producer Norman Whitfield, produced much of Right On, working to establish the "New Supremes" (as Motown began marketing the new Terrell-led lineup) as a group unique from the Ross-led Supremes. Right On features the Top 10 single "Up the Ladder to the Roof" and the Top 40 single "Everybody's Got the Right to Love". Other notable tracks include "Bill, When Are You Coming Back", an anti–Vietnam War song, and "The Loving Country", written by Ivy Jo Hunter and Smokey Robinson. A critical and commercial success, Right On reached number 25 on the Billboard Top 200 albums chart, higher than their previous album, Farewell.

On the album, the Supremes covered "Baby Baby" by the Miracles.

Professional ratings
Review scores
Source	Rating
Allmusic	3/5 stars
Record Mirror	(Favorable)

== Track listing ==
1. "Up the Ladder to the Roof" (Frank Wilson, Vincent DiMirco)
2. "Then We Can Try Again" (Clarence McMurray, J. Dean)
3. "Everybody's Got the Right to Love" (Lou Stallman)
4. "Wait a Minute Before You Leave Me" (N. Toney, W. Garrett, A. Hamilton)
5. "You Move Me" (W. Garrett, A. Hamilton)
6. "But I Love You More" (Frank Wilson, Sherlie Matthews)
7. "I Got Hurt (Trying to Be the Only Girl in Your Life)" (Clarence McMurray, J. Dean, J. Glover)
8. "Baby Baby" (H. Lewis, K. Lewis)
9. "Take a Closer Look at Me" (Henry Cosby, Pam Sawyer, Joe Hinton)
10. "Then I Met You" (J. Roach)
11. "Bill, When Are You Coming Back" (Pam Sawyer, Johnny Bristol)
12. "The Loving Country" (Smokey Robinson, Ivy Jo Hunter)

== Personnel ==
The Supremes

- Jean Terrell – lead vocals
- Mary Wilson, Cindy Birdsong, the Andantes and the Blackberries – background vocals
- The Funk Brothers – instrumentation

Technical

- Frank Wilson – producer
- Curtis McNair – art direction
- Frank Dandridge – photography

== Charts ==
=== Weekly charts ===
Chart (1970)	Peak position
Canada Top Albums/CDs (RPM)	41
US Billboard 200	25
US Top R&B/Hip-Hop Albums (Billboard)	4
US Cashbox Top 100	36

=== Year-end charts ===
Chart (1970)	Rank
US Top R&B/Hip-Hop Albums (Billboard)	23
