= Cindy Birdsong =

American singer (born 1939)

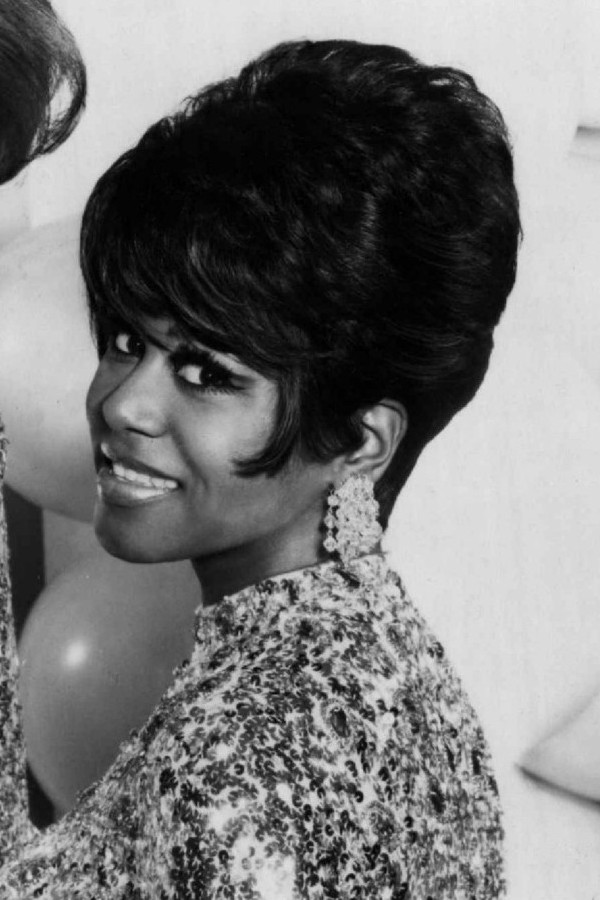
- Birdsong in 1967
- Born: Cynthia Ann Birdsong; December 15, 1939 (age 86); Mount Holly, New Jersey, U.S.
- Years active: 1960–1979; 1987–2011
- Spouse: Charles Hewlett (m. 1970; div. 1975)
- Children: 1
- Musical career
- Origin: Philadelphia, Pennsylvania, U.S.
- Genres: Soul; R&B; pop
- Occupations: Singer; songwriter; actress; nurse
- Instrument: Vocals
- Label: Hi-Hat Records
- Formerly of: The Supremes; LaBelle

Cynthia Ann Birdsong (born December 15, 1939) is an American singer who became famous as a member of the Supremes in 1967, when she replaced co-founding member Florence Ballard. Birdsong had previously been a member of Patti LaBelle and the Bluebelles.

== Biography ==
=== Early life ===
Birdsong was born in Mount Holly, New Jersey on December 15, 1939, as the eldest child of Lloyd Birdsong Sr. and Annie Birdsong. After living in Philadelphia for a duration of her childhood, the family returned to New Jersey, settling in Camden. Birdsong set her sights on becoming a nurse and attending college in Pennsylvania. When she returned to Philadelphia, she was contacted by a longtime friend, Patsy Holte, in 1960 to replace Sundray Tucker in Holt's singing group the Ordettes. At 20 years of age, Birdsong was the oldest member of the group; the other group members were still in their mid-teens.

=== Patti LaBelle and the Bluebelles ===
By 1962, the Ordettes gained two new members, Sarah Dash and Nona Hendryx, both of whom previously sang for a vocal group that had disbanded. In the same year, they auditioned for local record label owner Harold Robinson. Robinson agreed to work with the group after hearing LaBelle sing "I Sold My Heart to the Junkman".

Shortly after Robinson signed them, he had them record as the Blue Belles and they were selected to promote "I Sold My Heart to the Junkman", which had been recorded by the Starlets. It was ultimately recorded by the Bluebelles due to a conflict between record labels. The Starlets' manager sued Robinson after the Blue Belles were seen performing a lip-synched version of the song on the TV music show American Bandstand. After settling out of court, Robinson altered the group's name to "Patti LaBelle and the Blue Belles". Initially, a Billboard magazine ad cited the group as "Patti Bell and the Blue Bells". In 1963, the group scored their first hit single with the ballad "Down the Aisle". Later in the year, they recorded their rendition of "You'll Never Walk Alone"; the single was later re-released on Cameo-Parkway Records, where the group scored a second hit with the song on the pop charts in 1964. Another charted single, "Danny Boy", was released that same year. In 1965, after Cameo-Parkway folded, the group signed with Atlantic Records, where they recorded 12 singles for the label, including the modest hits "All or Nothing" and "Take Me for a Little While". The group's Atlantic tenure included their rendition of "Over the Rainbow" and a version of the song "Groovy Kind of Love".

=== Diana Ross & the Supremes (1967–1970) ===
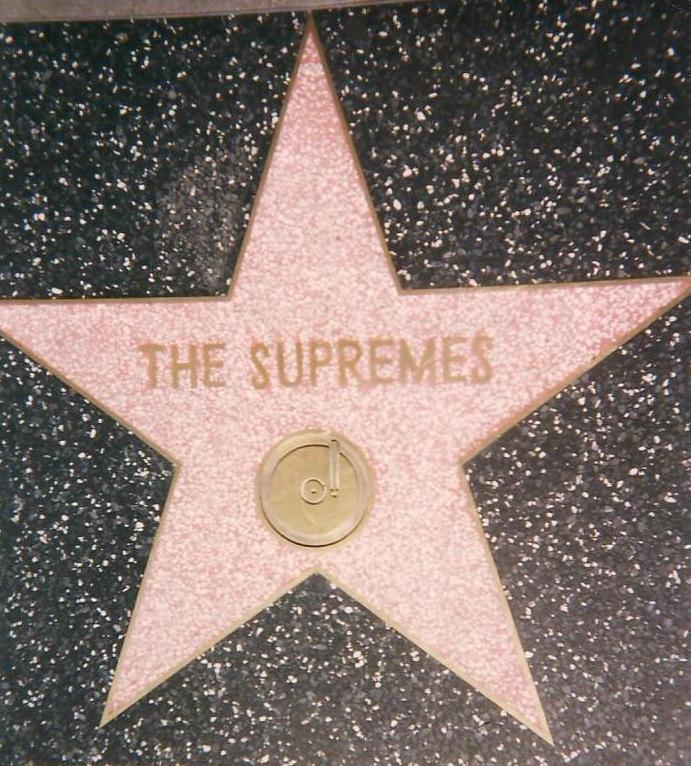
In 1994, The Supremes were recognized with a star on Hollywood Walk of Fame at 7060 Hollywood Blvd.

By this time, Birdsong was contacted by Berry Gordy in April 1967. She was being considered by Diana Ross as a replacement for Florence Ballard due to Ballard's reported "erratic behavior". Birdsong said:

All I was told was they wanted me there. I was met at the airport by Motown executives and driven to Berry Gordy's house where the group was having a meeting with him. I was a still a member of Patti's group and didn't even tell her that I was going to Detroit. So, the door of the room swung open and Florence came out in tears. Her mother came out with her. Oh, she was so upset, so shaken, she didn't even see me. It was then I realized that I was to replace her. I felt so bad, but later on Florence understood why I did it.

Birdsong began to rehearse with the Supremes, singing Ballard's vocals in her place. When Ballard was fired from the Supremes at the Flamingo Hotel in Las Vegas, forcing her sudden return to Detroit, Birdsong officially assumed her place during the second July 1 show.

During her tenure with the group, Berry Gordy mostly used the Andantes on background vocals to accompany Ross instead of Birdsong and Wilson. However, when the single "Someday We'll Be Together" hit number one, the group performed it together on The Ed Sullivan Show for their final television appearance with Ross on December 21, 1969.

=== Post Diana Ross: The "new" Supremes (1970–1972; 1973–1976) ===
In 1970, Jean Terrell replaced Ross as lead singer of the Supremes. However, at first, Syreeta Wright was considered a replacement but Terrell was chosen instead. In the new group, both Wilson and Birdsong's voices were heard more prominently, including the three albums the group recorded with the Four Tops. The group had a hit with the Four Tops with a cover version of Ike & Tina Turner's "River Deep – Mountain High". They scored more chart success at the beginning of the new decade, scoring hits in the United Kingdom, while having several pop and soul hits in the United States, including "Up the Ladder to the Roof", "Everybody's Got the Right to Love", "Stoned Love", "Nathan Jones", and "Floy Joy". However, Birdsong left to have her first child and was replaced by Lynda Laurence. Birdsong later returned to replace Laurence in 1973 after Laurence left to start a family with her husband Trevor Lawrence. It was also when Scherrie Payne joined the group as well, replacing Jean Terrell. During that period, Birdsong contributed to two albums: The Supremes (1975) and High Energy (1976). Birdsong was later fired from the Supremes in February 1976.

=== Later career ===
In June 1977, Mary Wilson performed a "farewell" concert with the Supremes (by then Scherrie Payne and Susaye Greene) and thereafter embarked on a solo career. In the fall of that year, Wilson was forced to play several Supremes dates, most notably in South America, that Payne and Greene could not fulfill on such short notice. Rather than risk lawsuits, Wilson recruited Birdsong and Debbie Sharpe as her backups, performing under the name "Mary Wilson of the Supremes".

After leaving the Supremes, Birdsong worked at UCLA Medical Center under her married name of Cindy Hewlett, then went to work for Suzanne de Passe at Motown Records. In 1983, Birdsong joined former Supremes Mary Wilson and Diana Ross in a one-off reunion on the Motown 25 anniversary television special. In 1986, she was a member of the Former Ladies of the Supremes along with Terrell and Payne but left to pursue a solo career in music. Once again, she was replaced by Laurence in the group. She briefly recorded for the small label Hi–Hat Records with the single "Dancing Room".

In 1999, Birdsong reunited with the Bluebelles, who had changed their name to Labelle after Birdsong's departure. It was the first time the group had been together in 32 years. The group accepted an R&B Foundation Award for Lifetime Achievement, and sang "You'll Never Walk Alone". In 2004, Birdsong joined Mary Wilson and Kelly Rowland (of Destiny's Child) to perform a medley of Supremes hits for the Motown 45 anniversary television special.

== Personal life ==
Birdsong married Charles Hewlett in August 1970 at the Fairmont Hotel in San Francisco. In attendance were her then singing partners Jean Terrell and Mary Wilson. This was Birdsong's first marriage and Hewlett's second marriage. Birdsong filed for divorce in March 1975, citing "irreconcilable differences". The couple have one son, Charles, known as David.

In June 2023, The New York Times printed a full-length article on Birdsong's health and financial status. Her family revealed that she had suffered several debilitating strokes, and expressed frustration with Birdsong's longtime caretaker and roommate, Rochelle Lander, who they said was preventing family support. However, in 2021, Birdsong was removed from her apartment by Los Angeles police and placed in a skilled-nursing facility. A judge awarded the family conservatorship in October 2023.

In April 2024, the New York Times printed a follow-up article, chronicling Birdsong's continued challenges. Her son, David, filed a lawsuit against Brad Herman, who had been credited with "rescuing" Birdsong from her financial and medical woes.

== Kidnapping ==
In December 1969, Birdsong was kidnapped while returning to her Los Angeles apartment with then–boyfriend Hewlett and their friend, Howard Meek. The intruder forced Birdsong to tie up the two, then forced her downstairs into her car at knifepoint. Birdsong managed to unlock the car door while her captor was driving and jumped out of the vehicle onto the Long Beach Freeway to safety. She was "hospitalised with cuts, bruises and knife wounds". Days later, Charles Collier, a maintenance man at Birdsong's apartment, surrendered himself to the Las Vegas police. In April of the following year, Collier was sentenced to five years to life in a California state prison. Collier claimed he "did not know why" he kidnapped Birdsong.

== Discography ==
=== Patti LaBelle & The Bluebells ===
==== Albums ====
- 1963: Sweethearts of the Apollo
- 1963: Sleigh Bells, Jingle Bells & Bluebells
- 1965: On Stage
- 1966: Over the Rainbow
- 1967: Dreamer

==== Singles ====
- 1962: "I Sold My Heart to the Junkman" (#15 U.S., #13 R&B)
- 1962: "I Found a New Love"
- 1962: "Tear After Tear"
- 1963: "Cool Water"
- 1963: "Decatur Street"
- 1963: "Down the Aisle (The Wedding Song)" (#37 U.S., #14 R&B)
- 1964: "You'll Never Walk Alone"(#34 U.S., #32 R&B)
- 1964: "One Phone Call (Will Do)"
- 1964: "Danny Boy" (#76 U.S.)
- 1965: "All or Nothing" (#68 U.S.)
- 1966: "Over the Rainbow"
- 1966: "Ebb Tide"
- 1966: "I'm Still Waiting" (#36 R&B)
- 1966: "Take Me for a Little While" (#89 U.S., #36 R&B)
- 1967: "Always Something There to Remind Me"
- 1967: "Dreamer"
- 1967: "Oh My Love"

=== Diana Ross & The Supremes ===
==== Albums ====
- 1968: Reflections
- 1968: Live at London's Talk of the Town
- 1968: Diana Ross & The Supremes Sing and Perform "Funny Girl"
- 1968: Diana Ross & The Supremes Join The Temptations (w/ The Temptations)
- 1968: Love Child
- 1968: TCB (w/ The Temptations)
- 1969: Let the Sunshine In
- 1969: Together (w/ The Temptations)
- 1969: Cream of the Crop
- 1969: G.I.T. on Broadway (w/ The Temptations)
- 1970: Farewell

==== Singles ====
(All singles with The Temptations)

- 1968: "I'm Gonna Make You Love Me" (#2 U.S., #2 R&B, #2 U.K.)
- 1969: "I'll Try Something New" (#25 U.S., #8 R&B)
- 1969: "The Weight" (#46 U.S., #33 R&B)
- 1969: "I Second That Emotion" (#18 U.K.)
- 1970: "Why (Must We Fall in Love)" (#31 U.K.)

=== The Supremes ===
==== Albums ====
- 1970: Right On
- 1970: The Magnificent 7 (w/ The Four Tops)
- 1970: New Ways but Love Stays
- 1971: The Return of the Magnificent Seven (w/ the Four Tops)
- 1971: Touch
- 1971: Dynamite (w/ The Four Tops)
- 1972: Floy Joy
- 1975: The Supremes
- 1976: High Energy

==== Singles ====
- 1970: "Up the Ladder to the Roof" (#10 U.S., #28 AC, #5 R&B, #6 U.K.)
- 1970: "Everybody's Got the Right to Love" (#21 U.S., #29 AC, #11 R&B)
- 1970: "Stoned Love" (#7 U.S., #24 AC, #1 R&B, #3 U.K.)
- 1970: "River Deep – Mountain High" (w/ The Four Tops) (#14 U.S., #7 R&B, #11 U.K.)
- 1971: "Nathan Jones" (#16 U.S., #29 AC, #8 R&B, #5 U.K.)
- 1971: "You Gotta Have Love in Your Heart" (w/ The Four Tops) (#55 U.S., #41 R&B, #25 U.K.)
- 1971: "Touch" (#71 U.S.)
- 1971: "Floy Joy" (#16 U.S., #33 AC, #5 R&B, #9 U.K.)
- 1972: "Automatically Sunshine" (#37 U.S., #17 AC, #21 R&B, #10 U.K.)
- 1972: "Without the One You Love" (w/ The Four Tops)
- 1972: "Your Wonderful, Sweet Sweet Love" (#59 U.S., #22 R&B)
- 1975: "He's My Man" (#69 R&B)
- 1975: "Where Do I Go from Here" (#93 R&B)
- 1975: "Early Morning Love"
- 1976: "I'm Gonna Let My Heart Do the Walking" (#40 U.S., #3 Dance, #25 R&B)
- 1976: "High Energy" (#9 Dance)

=== Solo ===
==== Singles ====
- 1987: "Dancing Room"
