= Lynda Laurence =

American singer (born 1949)

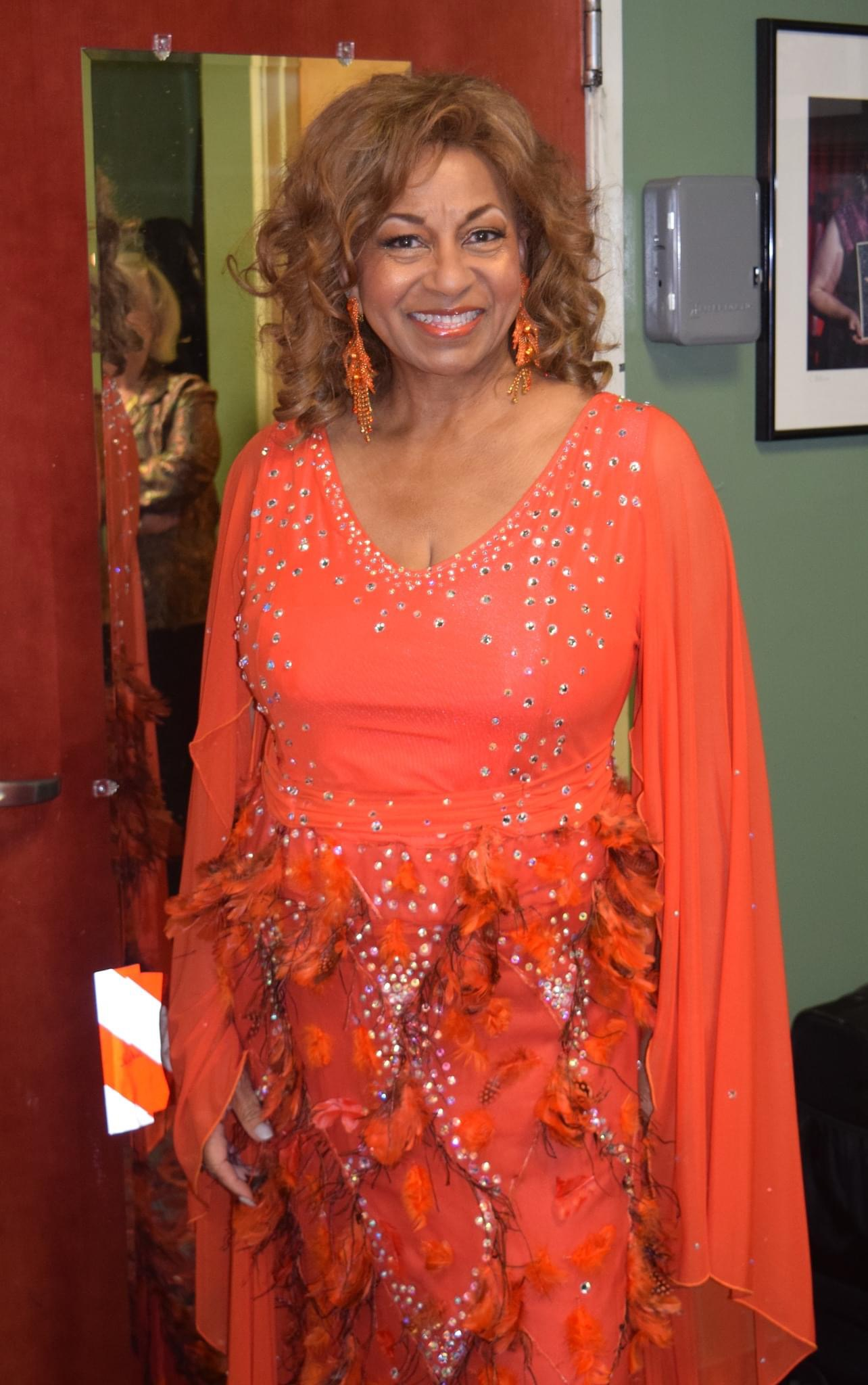
- Lynda Laurence in 2024

Background information
- Born: Lynda Cheryl Tucker; February 20, 1949 (age 77); Philadelphia, Pennsylvania, U.S.
- Genres: R&B; pop; jazz
- Occupation: Singer
- Instrument: Vocals
- Years active: 1969–present
- Labels: Motown, Motorcity

Lynda Laurence (also spelled Lawrence, born Lynda Cheryl Tucker; February 20, 1949) is an American singer. The youngest daughter of Louise and Ira Tucker, a gospel songwriter, producer, and singer, Laurence's siblings are Sundray Tucker and Ira Tucker Jr.

Laurence is best known for being a part of two Motown acts: Stevie Wonder's backup group The Third Generation, and a member of the Supremes from April 1972 through October 1973, performing alongside lead singer Jean Terrell and founding member Mary Wilson, replacing Cindy Birdsong after her departure from the group.

== Biography ==
=== Early years ===
Laurence began her career singing with a group named the Pendelles. Her sister, Sundray Tucker, was also in this group. She eventually made her way to Stevie Wonder's group Third Generation, a predecessor to Wonderlove, in 1969.

At this time, her sister was going by the name Cindy Scott, and rejoined Laurence in the group. Laurence, Scott and a third member, cousin Terri Hendricks, were billed as "The Third Generation" toured with Wonder to promote his single "Signed, Sealed, Delivered I'm Yours", which prominently featured Laurence on back-up vocals.

=== The Supremes (1972–1973) ===
In 1972, Mary Wilson, who chose to continue the legacy of the Supremes after the departure of Florence Ballard in 1967 and lead singer Diana Ross in 1970, was about to lose another member of the group, Cindy Birdsong, who was expecting a child.

Birdsong originally replaced Tucker in the group the Ordettes, later to be named Patti LaBelle & the Bluebelles, so it was ironic that Tucker's sister, Laurence took Birdsong's place as a backing vocalist. At this time, Jean Terrell was the lead singer of The Supremes. Laurence joined the group around the time the group issued their Floy Joy album, and appeared on the cover with Terrell and Wilson, though Birdsong had sung on the album before her departure. Among the songs she recorded with the group included the Wonder produced single, "Bad Weather", and The Supremes Produced and Arranged by Jimmy Webb album and The Supremes Live! In Japan album recorded in 1973.

While with the Supremes at Motown, Laurence did not record a lead vocal, however she did sing lead in concert on two occasions, the first being her debut with the Supremes in May 1972 at Hawaii's H.I.C Arena, when she replaced a ill Jean Terrell to perform alongside Wilson and Birdsong, and later at the Copacabana in New York. She also contributed the occasional lead in concert, singing a lead verse to the group's 1972 live version of "Love The One You're With".

In 1973, despite the success towards the end of the year, Terrell and Laurence decided that it would be best for the Supremes to leave Motown and seek another record label, however, Motown owned the name "Supremes". By October, when Laurence was expecting a child herself, she was again replaced by a returning Birdsong. In addition, Terrell quit that year and was replaced by Scherrie Payne.

=== Later career ===
In 1975, Laurence, along with Tucker and soon-to-be-member Susaye Greene, together with others added backing vocals to Stevie Wonder's Songs in the Key of Life, which was released in 1976. The same year, Laurence teamed up again with Tucker, this time under the name The Wilton Place Street Band. Under the leadership of Laurence's then-husband, the record producer and musician Trevor Lawrence, they recorded "Disco Lucy", which was a re-working of the theme tune to the I Love Lucy show.

In 2000, Laurence joined Diana Ross and Scherrie Payne for the Return to Love Tour billed as Diana Ross & the Supremes, despite the fact that the three were never members of the group at the same time. The tour was cancelled after less than half of the scheduled dates.

=== Background work ===
Laurence has provided studio backing vocals for:

- Stevie Wonder for his Signed, Sealed, and Delivered album in 1970
- Stevie Wonder for his Songs in the Key of Life album in 1976
- Aretha Franklin for her Love All The Hurt Away album in 1981
- Moacir Santos
- Jean Terrell for her I Had To Fall in Love album in 1978
- Joe Cocker
- Brian Setzer
- Harry Nilsson
- Brandy Norwood
- Ringo Starr
- Martha Reeves

=== Solo career ===
As a solo artist, Laurence recorded the songs "Give Me Back Just A Little Piece Of My Heart", "Life Is The Reason" and "Make Your Own Kind Of Music", among others, which were released under the name of Norma Lewis in the late 1980s. (Laurence was one of several session singers to provide vocals for the “Norma Lewis” project.) In 1990 and 1991 Laurence also recorded several solo tracks for the UK based Motorcity Records label, including the single "Living With A Married Man". The label folded before Laurence released a full album, however these songs have previously been released on subsequent Motorcity releases. Lynda Laurence was notably the first singer to record the song "I Still Believe", later made famous by Brenda K Starr and Mariah Carey.

=== Former Ladies of the Supremes ===
Laurence (once again replacing Cindy Birdsong) joined Jean Terrell and Scherrie Payne to form the Former Ladies of the Supremes in 1986. They have recorded multiple songs, including "We're Back" in 1987, which also featured Ali "Ollie" Woodson shortly after he left The Temptations, remakes of Supremes tunes plus a catalog of many non-Motown and original songs, including the 2006 dance single "Sisters United (We’re Taking Control)". They have maintained a solid fan base and in 2011 celebrated their 25th anniversary together. In 2017, Laurence left the group and was replaced by Susaye Greene. In 2024, Laurence returned to the group, replacing Greene.

== Personal life ==
Lynda was married to saxophonist, Trevor Lawrence. Together they have a son Trevor Ira Lawrence Jr., born in 1974, who is a session musician and producer under Dr. Dre's Aftermath Entertainment.

== Discography ==
As Norma Lewis

- "Give Me Back Just A Little Piece Of My Heart"
- "Life Is The Reason"
- "When Loving You"
- "You’ve Got Something"
- "Make Your Own Kind Of Music"

Motorcity Records

- "Forever"
- "Forever Came Today"
- "I'm Not Taking A Chance"
- "Right Around Midnight"
- "If This World We're Mine"
- "Outside Looking In"
- "The Man In My Life"
- "Living With A Married Man"
- "Fresh Out Of Tears"
- "It's A Crying Shame"

with Harry Nilsson

- "Just One Look"/"Baby I'm Yours"

Unreleased

- "Don't Cross The Street"
- "Feed The Hunger"
- "It Finally Happened To Be"
- "Someone Wonderful"

Live At The Courthouse Although never officially released, Laurence recorded a solo set of jazz material at Los Angeles's Courthouse venue, with resident band, Night Court.

- "On A Clear Day You Can See Forever"
- "I Wish You Love"
- "Green Dolphin Street"
- "Ill Wind"
- "Give Me The Simple Life"
- "Love Dance"
- "It Don't Mean A Thing (If It Ain't Got That Swing)"
- "Fever"
- "How Sweet It Is To Be Loved by You"
