= Automatically Sunshine =

Single by The Supremes

from the album Floy Joy
- B-side: "Precious Little Things"
- Released: April 11, 1972
- Recorded: 1972, Hitsville U.S.A.
- Genre: Pop, soul
- Length: 2:41 (single/album version)
- Label: Motown
- Songwriter: Smokey Robinson
- Producer: Smokey Robinson

The Supremes singles chronology
"Floy Joy" (1972)	"Automatically Sunshine" (1972)	"Without the One You Love" (1972)

Floy Joy track listing
- 9 tracks Side one: 1. "Your Wonderful, Sweet Sweet Love"; 2. "Floy Joy"; 3. "A Heart Like Mine"; 4. "Over and Over"; 5. "Precious Little Things"; Side two: 6. "Now The Bitter, Now The Sweet"; 7. "Automatically Sunshine"; 8. "The Wisdom of Time"; 9. "Oh Be My Love"

"Automatically Sunshine" is a song written by Smokey Robinson and released as a single by Motown singing group The Supremes as the second single from their album Floy Joy in 1972.

The single featured Jean Terrell and original Supreme Mary Wilson sharing lead vocals on the song. Floy Joy was one of the group's final albums recorded at Motown's Detroit studio, Hitsville U.S.A. On the US soul chart, "Automatically Sunshine" reached number twenty-one and was the Supremes' final top 40 US hit for four years peaking at number thirty-seven on the Billboard Hot 100, while it became the group's third consecutive top-ten single on the UK Singles Chart peaking at number ten.

== Charts ==
Chart (1972)	Peak position
Bangkok (Billboard)	3
Canada Top Singles (RPM)	31
Iceland (Íslenski Listinn)	10
UK Singles (Official Charts)	10
US Adult Contemporary (Billboard)	17
US Billboard Hot 100	37
US Hot R&B/Hip-Hop Songs (Billboard)	21
US Cashbox Top 100	37
US Cashbox R&B	31
US Record World Singles	47

== Personnel ==
- Lead vocals by Mary Wilson and Jean Terrell
- Background vocals by Mary Wilson, Jean Terrell and Cindy Birdsong
- Additional vocals by The Andantes
- Produced and written by Smokey Robinson
- Instrumentation by The Funk Brothers
