= Jean Terrell =

American R&B and jazz singer (born 1944)

- Born: Velma Jean Terrell; November 26, 1944 (age 81); Belzoni, Mississippi, U.S.
- Origin: Chicago, Illinois, U.S.
- Genres: R&B; soul; jazz
- Occupation: Singer
- Label: A&M

Velma Jean Terrell (born November 26, 1944) is an American R&B and jazz singer. She replaced Diana Ross as the lead singer of the Supremes in 1970.

== Biography ==
=== Early life and career ===
Terrell was born on November 26, 1944, in Belzoni, Mississippi, United States. She was born into a family of 10 children, and her father was a Mississippi sharecropper. When Terrell was a child, the family moved north when her father found employment in Chicago factories.

She is the sister of the former WBA heavyweight boxing champion Ernie Terrell, who fought Muhammad Ali.

Before her career with the Supremes, she sang with her brother Ernie in the group Ernie Terrell and the Knockouts (sometimes the Heavyweights).

=== The Supremes (1970–1973) ===
Motown president Berry Gordy discovered Terrell in 1969 in Miami, where she was performing with her brother at a club. Gordy was seeking a replacement for Diana Ross, who was leaving the group she had fronted during most of the 1960s, the Supremes, for a solo career. Gordy first signed Terrell to Motown as a solo artist but decided to join her with the Supremes as Ross's replacement alongside Mary Wilson and Cindy Birdsong, as announced in 1969.

After Ross's farewell show with the group at the Frontier Hotel in Las Vegas on January 14, 1970, Terrell joined the group on stage to be presented to the press and public. After this introduction, according to Mary Wilson, Gordy changed his mind about Terrell leading the group and suggested replacing her with Syreeta Wright. Gordy said:

I don't like Jean. I want to replace her with Syreeta.

Wilson vetoed this move, instead wanting to continue the group with Terrell.

The group scored more chart success at the beginning of the new decade, scoring hits in the United Kingdom, while having several pop and soul hits in the United States, including "Up the Ladder to the Roof", "Everybody's Got the Right to Love", "Stoned Love", "River Deep – Mountain High" (with the Four Tops), "Nathan Jones", and "Floy Joy".

After the success of "Floy Joy," Birdsong quit after getting pregnant and was replaced by Lynda Laurence. Despite the success toward the end of 1973, Terrell and Laurence decided that it would be best for the Supremes to leave Motown and seek another record label; however, Motown owned the name "Supremes", and Wilson was reluctant to leave, so both Terrell and Laurence departed the group that year. All three Supremes were not interested with Motown's seeming lack of interest in promoting this line-up of the group; in addition, Laurence was expecting a child at the time. Scherrie Payne, sister of Freda Payne, replaced Terrell, and Cindy Birdsong returned to replace Laurence in 1973.

=== Solo career ===
Signing a contract with A&M Records, A&M issued a solo album by Terrell, I Had to Fall in Love, in 1978, which did not make impact on any charts; however, she did promote the title track on the Dinah! show in July 1978. Terrell had a minor hit with "Don't Stop Reaching for the Top", which peaked at #72 on the R&B charts. Despite A&M's plans to extensively promote Terrell in an effort to boost their R & B division, Terrell declined to travel extensively and leave her family. She also complained that certain plans A&M had for her conflicted with her Jehovah Witness beliefs. The album failed and she was dropped. In the early 1980s, Terrell put together a one-woman show and did limited touring throughout the United States. Her act consisted of several Supremes songs, songs from her solo album, and cover versions of songs by Bette Midler and Lionel Richie. Laurence would often perform background vocals for Terrell throughout the tour. Freddi Poole also performed backing vocals for Terrell during these tours, and she was later a member of Payne and Laurence's group, the Former Ladies of the Supremes.

=== Former Ladies of the Supremes ===
In 1985, eight years after the Supremes officially broke up in 1977, Payne was signed to SuperStar International Records, a Los Angeles-based record label. Her then-partner Ronnie Phillips approached her with the idea of reforming the Supremes, to which she agreed, and asked Wilson and Birdsong to join the group. Wilson declined, instead opting to continue her solo career, while Birdsong agreed and persuaded Terrell to join the new group.

The grouping of Terrell, Payne and Birdsong set about forming a spinoff group of the Supremes, although they had contractual difficulties over the ownership of the name. They decided to create an entirely new group using the abbreviation "FLOS" for the name the Former Ladies of the Supremes. Before the group began their career, Birdsong left for a solo career, and Laurence joined the lineup alongside Terrell and Payne, replacing Birdsong just as she had in 1972. The group released the song "We're Back" on SuperStar International Records. However, the label did not have national distribution, and the song failed to chart. The label folded after. The group began touring and performing in shows around this time, making their debut at the Wilshire Ebell Theatre in Los Angeles in 1987. By then, they recorded several singles for the United Kingdom-based Motorcity Records label for Ian Levine throughout 1989 and 1990, joining a roster of former Motown artists. After several single releases out of the United Kingdom failed to catch on, Terrell again became disenchanted and suddenly dropped out of the group.

=== Recent years ===
In December 1992, Terrell left the group and was replaced by Sundray Tucker. In 1996, Tucker left the trio and Terrell made a brief comeback to the group, reuniting with both Payne and Laurence for two special concerts held at the Industry Cafe in Los Angeles. This reunion ended with the recruitment of Freddi Poole in July 1996. In 2004, Terrell released a biographical DVD, "Through the Eyes of a Supreme", and has continued to sing onstage with various jazz musicians. A planned CD of Jazz music never materialized after her DVD release. She has made an occasional appearance onstage (along with Poole and Mary Flowers), singing Supremes hits.

== Personal life ==
Jean married Juan Thompson in 1973 shortly after leaving The Supremes. They divorced in the mid-1980s. The union produced two sons, Jason and Jonathan.

== Discography ==
=== Albums ===
With The Supremes

List of albums, with selected chart positions and certificationsAll records released on Motown Records.
| Title | Album details | Peak chart positions | | | | | | | Sales | Certifications |
| Title | Album details | US | US R&B /HH | US Record World | CAN | GER | NOR | UK | Sales | Certifications |
|---|---|---|---|---|---|---|---|---|---|---|
| Right On | Released: April 26, 1970; Label: Motown (#Motown 705); Format: LP, cassette | 25 | 4 | 24 | 41 | — | — | — | | |
| The Magnificent 7 (with the Four Tops) | Released: September, 1970; Label: Motown (#MS 717); Format: LP, cassette | 113 | 18 | 102 | 73 | — | — | 6 | UK: 30,000 (Note: United Kingdom sales figure for The Magnificent 7, as of 1971.) | |
| New Ways but Love Stays | Released: October, 1970; Label: Motown (#MS 720); Format: LP, cassette | 68 | 12 | 43 | — | — | — | — | | |
| The Return of the Magnificent Seven (with the Four Tops) | Released: June, 1971; Label: Motown (#MS 736); Format: LP, cassette | 154 | 18 | 72 | — | — | — | — | | |
| Touch | Released: June, 1971; Label: Motown (#MS 737); Format: LP, 4-track, 8-track | 85 | 6 | 66 | — | — | — | 40 | | |
| Dynamite (with the Four Tops) | Released: December, 1971; Label: Motown (#M 745 L); Format: LP, cassette | 160 | 21 | – | — | — | — | — | | |
| Floy Joy | Released: May, 1972; Label: Motown (#M 7511 L); Format: LP, 8-track, cassette | 54 | 12 | 44 | – | — | — | — | | |
| The Supremes Produced and Arranged by Jimmy Webb | Released: November, 1972; Label: Motown (#M 756 L); Format: LP | 129 | 27 | 104 | — | — | — | — | | |
"—" denotes the album failed to chart or was not released

=== Singles ===
List of singles, with selected chart positions, sales and certifications, showing year released and album nameAll records released on Motown Records.
| A-side title B-side title | Year | Peak chart positions | | | | | | | | | | Sales | Certifications | Album |
| A-side title B-side title | Year | US | US R&B /HH | AUS | BEL (WA) | BGK | CAN | IRE | ISL | NLD | UK | Sales | Certifications | Album |
The Supremes
| "Up the Ladder to the Roof" "Bill, When Are You Coming Back" | 1970 | 10 | 5 | 43 | — | — | 8 | — | 10 | — (Note: "Up the Ladder to the Roof" did not enter the Dutch Top 40, but peaked at number 2 on the Tipparade, 'bubbling under' Top 40 chart.) | 6 | US: 1,000,000 (Note: United States sales figure for "Up the Ladder to the Roof", as of 1986.) | | Right On |
| "Everybody's Got the Right to Love" "But I Love You More" | 1970 | 21 | 11 | — | — | — | 14 | — | — | — (Note: "Everybody's Got the Right to Love" did not enter the Dutch Top 40, but peaked at number 18 on the Tipparade, 'bubbling under' Top 40 chart.) | — | | | Right On |
| "Stoned Love" "Shine on Me" | 1970 | 7 | 1 | 99 | 37 | — | 9 | 19 | 6 | — | 3 | US: 1,000,000 (Note: United States sales figure for "Stoned Love", as of 1986.); UK: 59,000 (Note: United Kingdom digital sales figure for "Stoned Love", as of 2019.) | | New Ways but Love Stays |
| "River Deep, Mountain High" "Together We Can Make Such Sweet Music" (with the Four Tops) | 1970 | 14 | 7 | — | 35 | — | 20 | 12 | — | 25 | 11 | | | The Magnificent 7 |
| "Reach Out and Touch (Somebody's Hand)" "Where Would I Be Without You Baby" (with the Four Tops) | 1970 | — | — | 56 | — | — | — | — | — | — | — | | | The Magnificent 7 |
| "A Taste of Honey" (Note: "A Taste of Honey" was only released in the Netherlands, Lebanon and Turkey.) "Knock on My Door" (with the Four Tops) | 1971 | — | — | — | — | — | — | — | — | — (Note: "A Taste of Honey" did not enter the Dutch Top 40, but peaked at number 7 on the Tipparade, 'bubbling under' Top 40 chart.) | — | | | The Magnificent 7 |
| "Nathan Jones" "Happy (Is a Bumpy Road)" | 1971 | 16 | 8 | — | 42 | — | 15 | — | — | 27 | 5 | US: 1,000,000 (Note: United States sales figure for "Nathan Jones", as of 1986.) | | Touch |
| "You Gotta Have Love in Your Heart" "I'm Glad About It" (with the Four Tops) | 1971 | 55 | 41 | — | — | — | — | — | — | — | 25 | | | The Return of the Magnificent Seven |
| "Touch" "It's So Hard for Me to Say Good-bye" | 1971 | 71 | — | — | — | — | 71 | — | — | — | — | | | Touch |
| "Floy Joy" "This Is the Story" (from Touch) | 1971 | 16 | 5 | — | — | — | 31 | — | — | — | 9 | US: 1,000,000 (Note: United States sales figure for "Floy Joy", as of 1984.) | | Floy Joy |
| "Automatically Sunshine" "Precious Little Things" | 1972 | 37 | 21 | — | — | 3 | 49 | — | 10 | — | 10 | | | Floy Joy |
| "Without the One You Love" "Let's Make Love Now" (with the Four Tops) | 1972 | — | — | — | — | 17 | — | — | — | — | — | | | The Magnificent 7 |
| "Your Wonderful, Sweet Sweet Love" "The Wisdom of Time" | 1972 | 59 | 22 | — | — | — | 81 | — | — | — | — | | | Floy Joy |
| "I Guess I'll Miss the Man" "Over and Over" (from Floy Joy) | 1972 | 85 | — | — | — | — | — | — | — | — | — | | | The Supremes Produced and Arranged by Jimmy Webb |
| "Bad Weather" "Oh Be My Love" (from Floy Joy) | 1973 | 87 | 74 | — | — | — | — | — | — | — | 37 | | | Non-album single |
| "Tossin' and Turnin'" "Oh Be My Love" (from Floy Joy) | 1973 | — | — | — | — | — | — | — | — | — | — | | | The Supremes Produced and Arranged by Jimmy Webb |

== Notes ==
| Preceded by Diana Ross | The Supremes lead singer 1970 – '73 | Succeeded by Scherrie Payne |
