= Stoned Love =

Single by The Supremes

from the album New Ways but Love Stays
- B-side: "Shine On Me"
- Released: October 15, 1970
- Recorded: March 10, April 2, and April 27, 1970; New York City studio: May 12, 1970
- Studio: Golden World (Studio B), Detroit
- Genre: Soul, pop, psychedelic soul
- Length: 2:57 (single version); 4:07 (album version)
- Label: Motown; M 1172
- Songwriters: Kenny Thomas^{1}; Frank Wilson
- Producer: Frank Wilson

The Supremes singles chronology
"Everybody's Got the Right to Love" (1970)	"Stoned Love" (1970)	"River Deep, Mountain High (with The Four Tops)" (1970)

New Ways but Love Stays track listing
- 10 tracks Side one: 1. "Together We Can Make Such Sweet Music"; 2. "Stoned Love"; 3. "It's Time to Break Down"; 4. "Bridge over Troubled Water"; 5. "I Wish I Were Your Mirror"; Side two: 6. "Come Together"; 7. "Is There a Place (In His Heart for Me)"; 8. "Na Na Hey Hey (Kiss Him Goodbye)"; 9. "Shine on Me"; 10. "Thank Him for Today"

"Stoned Love" is a 1970 hit single recorded by The Supremes for the Motown label and the last Billboard Pop Top Ten hit for the group, spending five weeks there, and peaking at number seven, and their last Billboard number-one R&B hit as well. The tune was also the post-Ross Supremes' biggest hit in the UK, reaching number 3 and occupying six weeks in the top ten, and the trio had top ten hits in the UK into 1972. The BBC ranked "Stoned Love" at number 99 on The Top 100 Digital Motown Chart, which ranks Motown releases solely on their all time UK downloads and streams.

== History ==
1970 Motown advertisement in Billboard for "Stoned Love" and its parent album New Ways but Love Stays.

=== Song information ===
A plea for love and peace similar to those recorded by Sly & the Family Stone in the late 1960s, the lyrics of "Stoned Love" were a plea for the people of the world to end conflict and animosity between each other, specifically the Vietnam War. Writer Kenny Thomas chose the term "stone love" to define the concept of an unchanging bond between one another. The same phrase appeared more than sixteen years later in Kool & the Gang's title "Stone Love" and in a slight variant two years later in The Stylistics' title "I'm Stone in Love with You".

Thomas was a Detroit teenager who had entered some of his songs into a local radio talent show, on WJLB-AM Detroit, hosted by influential DJ Ernie Durham. “He heard some of my music,” recalled Thomas, “and said, ‘Come on down and do the show.’ ”

Motown record producer Frank Wilson, who had tuned into the station, arranged a meeting with the young musician at Thomas' house, where he proceeded to play a number of songs on a guitar with only two strings. One of the songs he played was an unfinished version of "Stoned Love." Wilson was very much impressed with the song and came back to Thomas' house a few days later with, to Thomas' delight and surprise, Supremes member Mary Wilson (no relation to Frank).

After a few lines of the song were revised by the producer, "Stoned Love" was recorded during the spring of 1970. The instrumental track was recorded with The Funk Brothers and at least 30 other session musicians in Detroit at Motown Studio B (the former Golden World studio), while Jean Terrell, Mary Wilson, and Cindy Birdsong recorded their vocals in New York. The song was originally written and recorded as "Stone Love", but during the process of mixing and releasing, it was mislabeled as "Stoned Love".

=== Release and controversy ===
The Supremes' album New Ways but Love Stays, released in October 1970, spawned only "Stoned Love" as a single.

Many people saw the song as a coded reference to drug use, and many radio station owners were at first apprehensive to play the record. Motown founder Berry Gordy was also said to have hated the song, and label executive Barney Ales had to arrange for the RKO radio stations to agree to play "Stoned Love" before releasing the single. Fearing that the song was indeed a reference to drug use, CBS cut a live performance of the song from a November 1970 episode of The Merv Griffin Show.

=== In other media ===
The song also appears in the 1994 film Forrest Gump starring Tom Hanks. In 2004 neo soul singer Angie Stone covered the tune as the intro to her Stone Love album.

Manchester band The Stone Roses used the song as their intro track before taking to the stage for each night of their hugely successful 2012 reunion tour.

== Notes ==
- ^{1} Kenny Thomas' writing credit on "Stoned Love" is listed as "Yennek Samoht"; his name spelled backwards (with an extra "e" to aid pronunciation). He did this both to emulate Stevie Wonder (who recorded an instrumental album under the name "Eivets Rednow") and because he thought "Samoht" was close to the last name of his idol Nina Simone.

== Personnel ==
- Lead vocals by Jean Terrell
- Background vocals by Jean Terrell, Mary Wilson and Cindy Birdsong
- Instrumentation by the Funk Brothers
- Arranged by David Van De Pitte

== Chart performance ==
=== Weekly charts ===
Weekly chart performance for "Stoned Love"
Chart (1970–1971)	Peak position
Australia (Kent Music Report)	99
Belgium (Ultratop 50 Wallonia)	37
Canada Top Singles (RPM)	9
Iceland (Íslenski Listinn)	6
Ireland (IRMA)	19
Singapore (Billboard)	8
UK Singles (Official Charts)	3
US Adult Contemporary (Billboard)	24
US Billboard Hot 100	7
US Hot R&B/Hip-Hop Songs (Billboard)	1
US Cashbox Top 100	5
US Cashbox R&B	1
US Record World Singles	5
US Record World R&B Singles	1

=== Year-end charts ===
Year-end chart performance for "Stoned Love"
Chart (1970–1971)	Rank
UK Singles (OCC)	37
US Cashbox R&B	71
US (Joel Whitburn's Pop Annual)	66

== Certifications ==
Certifications for "Stoned Love"
Region	Certification	Certified units/sales
United Kingdom Digital sales and streams only	—	59,000
United States	—	1,000,000
