= Up the Ladder to the Roof =

Single by The Supremes

from the album Right On
- B-side: "Bill, When Are You Coming Back"
- Released: February 16, 1970 (U.S.)
- Recorded: January – February 1970
- Studio: Hitsville U.S.A. (Studio A)
- Genre: Soul, R&B
- Length: 3:11 (album/single version)
- Label: Motown; M 1162
- Songwriters: Frank Wilson; Vincent DiMirco
- Producer: Frank Wilson

The Supremes singles chronology
"Someday We'll Be Together" (1969)	"Up the Ladder to the Roof" (1970)	"The Rhythm of Life (with The Temptations)" (1970)

"Up the Ladder to the Roof" is a 1970 hit single recorded first by The Supremes for the Motown label. It was the first Supremes single to feature new lead singer Jean Terrell in place of Diana Ross, who officially left the group for a solo career two weeks before the recording of this song in January 1970. This song also marks a number of other firsts: it is the first Supremes single since "The Happening" in 1967 to be released under the name "The Supremes" instead of "Diana Ross & The Supremes", the first Supremes single solely produced by Norman Whitfield associate Frank Wilson, and the first Supremes single to make the United Kingdom Top 10 since "Reflections" in 1967.

Frank Wilson wrote the music for the song, with lyrics written by an Italian-American songwriter from New York City named Vincent DiMirco.

"Up the Ladder to the Roof" rose to number ten on the Billboard Hot 100 and number five on the soul chart, in the spring of 1970. Outside the US, The Supremes scored a #6 smash with the song in the UK and number eight in Canada.

== Reception ==
Billboard called the song 'a blockbuster', writing 'Mary and Cindy come off strong behind the fine lead in this swinger that will spiral the chart.

Rashod Ollison of The Virginian-Pilot, described "Up the Ladder to the Roof" as 'one of the most buoyant singles in Motown's fabled catalog' with 'lush orchestration undergirded by a rock-steady rhythm section, an arrangement that floats comfortably between pop and soul without ever settling in either category.' Ollison compared Jean Terrell and Diana Ross' voices, writing 'Jean's cooing style is similar to Diana's – pretty, seductive and feather-soft. But she sings with more power.' Ollison also noted 'Unlike previous Supremes records, the background vocals are more prominent, mixed high above the busy percussion, handclaps and soaring strings.'

Matthew Greenwald of Allmusic gave similar praise, writing, 'the group, featuring new lead vocalist Jean Terrell, began a very brief and satisfying series of recordings that were easily among the group's finest recordings with or without Ross'. Greenwald described the song as having 'A fine and well-crafted pop/soul confection,' whilst the 'melody has a sweet melodic soul, couched in the then studio nous that Motown was experimenting. Sterling strings and some funky wah-wah guitars are contemporary touches, but it's the group's command of the innocence of the lyrics that takes center stage, making this one of the group's latter-day highlights.'

Entertainment Weekly gave the song a B−, writing, 'The first of only a handful of post-Diana Ross top 10 hits, this one’s got some funky conga action. But the vocal, while serviceable, is pretty forgettable.'

The single reportedly sold a million copies in the US.

== Personnel ==
- Lead vocals by Jean Terrell
- Background vocals by Mary Wilson, Cindy Birdsong and Jean Terrell
- Instrumentation by The Funk Brothers
- Arranged by David Van De Pitte

== Charts ==
=== Weekly charts ===
Chart (1970)	Peak position
Australia (Go-Set)	39
Australia (Kent Music Report)	43
Canada Top Singles (RPM)	8
Iceland (Íslenski Listinn)	10
Netherlands (Dutch Top 40 Tipparade)	2
UK Singles (Official Charts)	6
US Billboard Hot 100	10
US Hot R&B/Hip-Hop Songs (Billboard)	5
US Adult Contemporary (Billboard)	28
US Cashbox Top 100	9
US Cashbox R&B	6
US Record World 100 Top Pops	7
US Record World Top 50 R&B	4

=== Year-end charts ===
Chart (1970)	Rank
UK Singles (OCC)	69
US Billboard Hot 100	88
US Hot R&B/Hip-Hop Songs (Billboard)	27
US Cashbox Top 100	90
US Cashbox R&B	51

== Certifications ==
Region	Certification	Certified units/sales
United States	—	1,000,000
