= Floy Joy (song) =

Single by The Supremes

from the album Floy Joy
- B-side: "This Is the Story"
- Released: December 1, 1971
- Recorded: 1971, Detroit, Michigan
- Genre: Pop, Soul music
- Length: 2:31 (single version) 2:49 (album version)
- Label: Motown
- Songwriter: Smokey Robinson
- Producer: Smokey Robinson

The Supremes singles chronology
"Touch" (1971)	"Floy Joy" (1971)	"Automatically Sunshine" (1972)

Floy Joy track listing
- 9 tracks Side one: 1. "Your Wonderful, Sweet Sweet Love"; 2. "Floy Joy"; 3. "A Heart Like Mine"; 4. "Over and Over"; 5. "Precious Little Things"; Side two: 6. "Now The Bitter, Now The Sweet"; 7. "Automatically Sunshine"; 8. "The Wisdom of Time"; 9. "Oh Be My Love"

"Floy Joy" is a song written by Smokey Robinson and released as a single in December 1971 by Motown female singing group The Supremes.

It was written and recorded by the group's former mentor Robinson, marking his first production of a Supremes song since 1969's "The Composer". It featured original Supreme Mary Wilson and the newly recruited Jean Terrell on lead vocals. This was the third single by the group to feature lead vocals by Wilson.

It peaked at number five on the Billboard Hot R&B/Hip-Hop Songs charts, number 16 on the American pop singles chart and number nine on the UK Singles Chart.

== Personnel ==
- Lead vocals by Mary Wilson and Jean Terrell
- Background vocals by Mary Wilson, Jean Terrell, Cindy Birdsong
- Additional vocals by The Andantes
- Instrumentation by The Funk Brothers and Marv Tarplin of The Miracles
- Produced and written by William "Smokey" Robinson

== Critical reception ==
Cashbox published, 'Smoky wrote this one for the girls and it's much in the tradition of "Baby Love." Basic footstomper could go all the way for them, pop and soul.'

== Charts ==
=== Weekly charts ===
Chart (1971)	Peak position
Canada Top Singles (RPM)	31
UK Singles (Official Charts)	9
US Adult Contemporary (Billboard)	33
US Billboard Hot 100	16
US Hot R&B/Hip-Hop Songs (Billboard)	5
US Cashbox Top 100	16
US Cashbox R&B	6
US Record World Singles	18
US Record World R&B Singles	5

=== Year-end charts ===
Chart (1972)	Rank
US Cashbox R&B	72

== Certifications ==
Region	Certification	Certified units/sales
United States	—	1,000,000
