= The Supremes =

American girl group

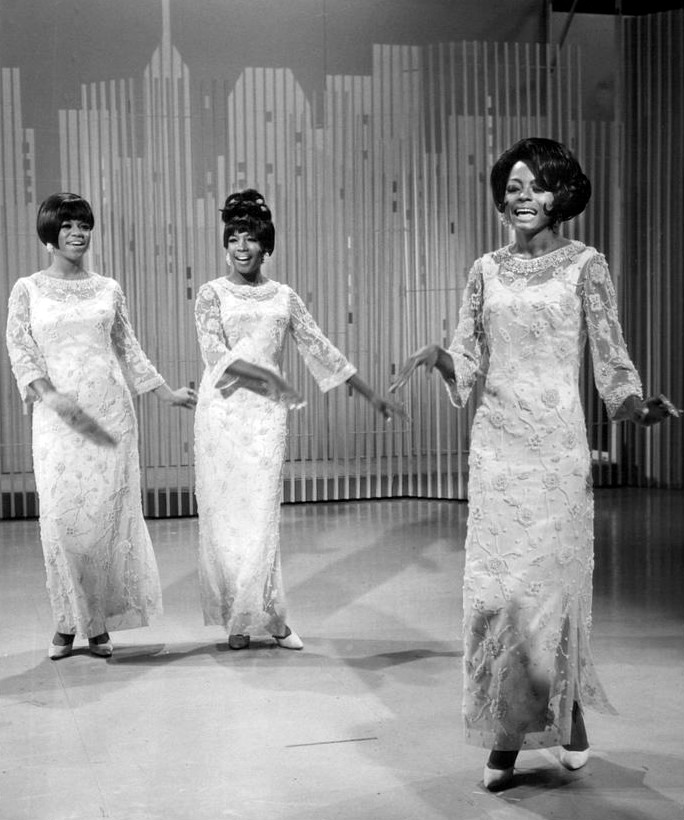
- (L–R): Ballard, Wilson, and Ross performing "My World Is Empty Without You" on The Ed Sullivan Show in 1966

Background information
- Also known as: The Primettes (1959–1961); The Supremes with Diana Ross (1967); Diana Ross & the Supremes (1967–1970, 2000)
- Origin: Detroit, Michigan, U.S.
- Genres: R&B; soul; pop; doo-wop; disco
- Works: The Supremes discography
- Years active: 1959–1977; 1983; 2000
- Labels: Lu Pine (Primettes); Motown (Supremes)
- Past members: Diana Ross; Mary Wilson; Florence Ballard; Betty McGlown; Barbara Martin; Cindy Birdsong; Jean Terrell; Lynda Laurence; Scherrie Payne; Susaye Greene

The Supremes were an American girl group formed in Detroit, Michigan, in 1959 as the Primettes. The premier act of Motown Records during the 1960s, the Supremes were the most commercially successful of Motown's acts and the most successful American vocal group, with twelve number 1 singles on the Billboard Hot 100. Most of these hits were written and produced by Motown's main songwriting and production team, Holland–Dozier–Holland. The breakthrough by the Supremes is considered to have made it possible for future African-American R&B and soul musicians to find mainstream success. Billboard ranked the Supremes as the 16th greatest Hot 100 artist of all time.

Florence Ballard, Mary Wilson, Diana Ross, and Betty McGlown, the original members, were all from the Brewster-Douglass public housing project in Detroit. Forming as the Primettes, they were the sister act to the Primes (with Paul Williams and Eddie Kendricks, who went on to form the Temptations). Barbara Martin replaced McGlown in 1960, and the group signed with Motown the following year as the Supremes. Martin left the group in early 1962, and Ross, Ballard, and Wilson continued as a trio.

During the mid-1960s, the Supremes achieved mainstream success with Ross as lead singer and Holland–Dozier–Holland as its songwriting and production team. In 1967, Motown president Berry Gordy renamed the group Diana Ross & the Supremes, and replaced Ballard with Cindy Birdsong. In 1970, Ross left to pursue a solo career and was replaced by Jean Terrell, and the group's name was reverted to the Supremes. During the mid-1970s, group continued to change with Lynda Laurence, Scherrie Payne and Susaye Greene joining until, 18 years after its formation, it disbanded in 1977.

Ross is the sole surviving original member, with the deaths of Ballard in 1976, McGlown in 2008, and Wilson in 2021.

== History ==
=== Origins ===
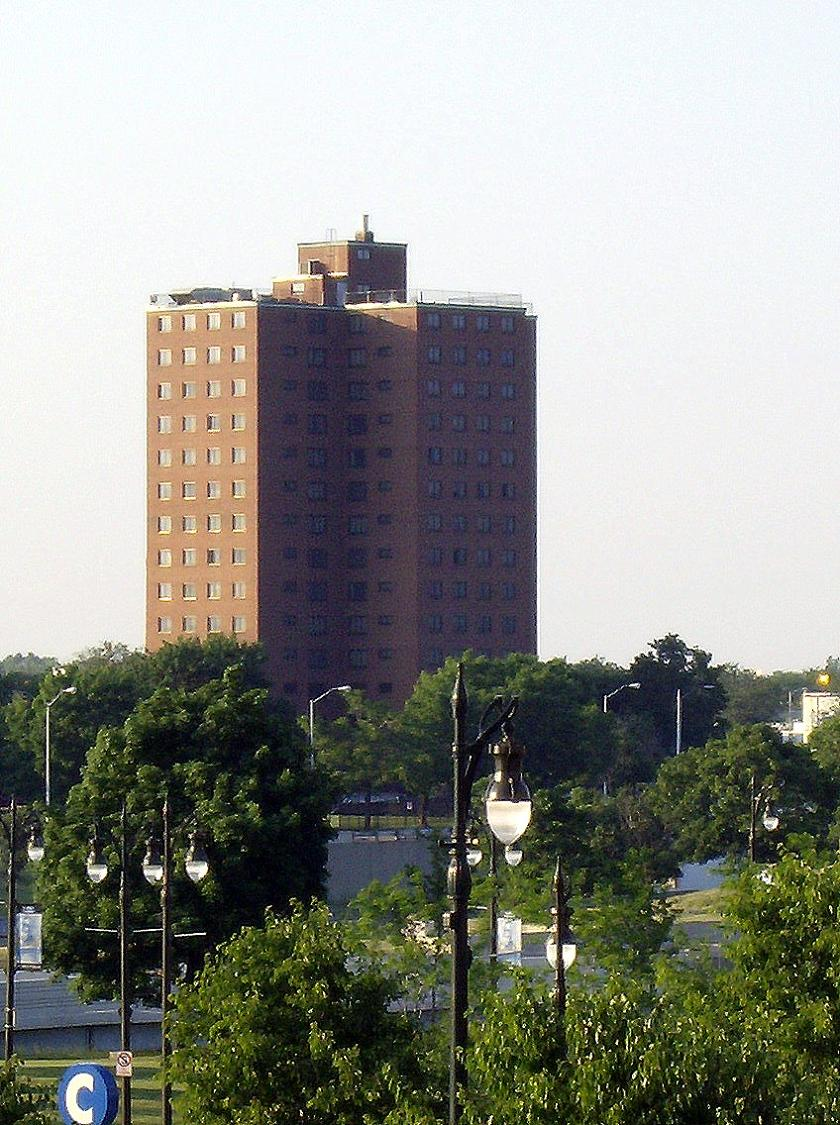
Frederick Douglass Housing Project in Detroit

In Detroit in 1958, Florence Ballard, a junior high school student living in the Brewster-Douglass Housing Projects, met Paul Williams and Eddie Kendricks, who were two members of a Detroit singing group known as the Primes, managed by Milton Jenkins. Ballard sang, as did Paul Williams' girlfriend Betty McGlown, so Jenkins decided to create a "sister" group to be called the Primettes. Ballard recruited her best friend Mary Wilson, and then Paul Williams recruited Diana Ross. Mentored and funded by Jenkins, the Primettes began by performing hit songs of artists such as Ray Charles and the Drifters at sock hops, social clubs and talent shows around the Detroit area. Receiving additional guidance from Jesse Greer,^{[A]} the quartet quickly earned a local fan following. The group crafted an age-appropriate style that was inspired by the collegiate dress of popular doo-wop group Frankie Lymon & the Teenagers. For the most part, Ballard, Ross and Wilson performed equal leads on songs. Within a few months, guitarist Marvin Tarplin was added to the Primettes' lineup—a move that helped distinguish the group from Detroit's many other aspiring acts by allowing them to sing live instead of lip-synching.

After winning the Windsor–Detroit International Freedom Festival on July 4, 1960, the Primettes' sights were set on making a record. In hopes of getting the group signed to the local upstart Motown label, in 1960 Ross asked an old neighbor, Miracles lead singer Smokey Robinson, to help the group land an audition for Motown executive Berry Gordy, who had already proven himself a capable songwriter. Robinson liked "the girls" (as they were then known around Motown) and agreed to help, but he liked their guitarist even more; with the Primettes' permission he hired Tarplin, who became the guitarist for the Miracles. Robinson arranged for the Primettes to audition a cappella for Gordy—but Gordy, feeling they were too young and inexperienced to be recording artists, encouraged them to return when they had graduated from high school. Undaunted, later that year the Primettes recorded a single for Lu Pine Records, a label created just for them, titled "Tears of Sorrow", which was backed with "Pretty Baby". The single failed to find an audience, however. Shortly thereafter, McGlown became engaged and left the group. Barbara Martin was McGlown's prompt replacement.

Determined to leave an impression on Gordy and join the stable of rising Motown stars, the Primettes frequented his Hitsville U.S.A. recording studio. Eventually, they convinced Gordy to allow them to contribute hand claps and background vocals for the songs of other Motown artists including Marvin Gaye and Mary Wells. In January 1961, Gordy finally relented and agreed to sign them to his label – but under the condition that they change the name of their group. The Primes had by this time combined with Otis Williams & the Distants and would soon sign to Motown as the Temptations. Gordy gave Ballard a list of names to choose from that included suggestions such as "the Darleens", "the Sweet Ps", "the Melodees", "the Royaltones" and "the Jewelettes". Ballard chose another suggestion, "the Supremes". In the spring of 1962, Martin left the group to start a family. Thus, the newly named Supremes continued as a trio.

Between 1961 and 1963, the Supremes released six singles, starting with "I Want a Guy" and "Buttered Popcorn" on Motown subsidiary label Tamla. However, none of those first six singles charted in the Top 40 positions of the Billboard Hot 100. Jokingly referred to as the "no-hit Supremes" around Motown's Hitsville U.S.A. offices, the group attempted to compensate for their lack of hits by taking on any work available at the studio, including providing hand claps and singing backup for Motown artists such as Marvin Gaye and the Temptations. During these years, all three members took turns singing lead: Wilson favored soft ballads, Ballard favored soulful, hard-driving songs, and Ross favored mainstream pop songs. Most of their early material was written and produced by Berry Gordy or Smokey Robinson. In December 1963, the single "When the Lovelight Starts Shining Through His Eyes" peaked at number 23 on the Billboard Hot 100.

"Lovelight" was the first of many Supremes songs written by the Motown songwriting and production team known as Holland–Dozier–Holland. In late 1963, Berry Gordy chose Diane Ross — who began going by "Diana" in 1965—as the official lead singer of the group. Ballard and Wilson were periodically given solos on Supremes albums, and Ballard continued to sing her solo number, "People", in concert for the next two years.

In the spring of 1964, the Supremes recorded the single "Where Did Our Love Go". The song was intended by Holland-Dozier-Holland for the Marvelettes, who rejected it. Although the Supremes disliked the song, the producers coerced them into recording it. In August 1964, while the Supremes toured as part of Dick Clark's Caravan of Stars, "Where Did Our Love Go" reached number 1 on the US pop charts, much to the surprise and delight of the group. It was also their first song to appear on the UK singles chart, where it reached number 3.

"Where Did Our Love Go" was followed by four consecutive US number 1 hits: "Baby Love" (which was also a number 1 hit in the UK), "Come See About Me", "Stop! In the Name of Love" and "Back in My Arms Again". "Baby Love" was nominated for the 1965 Grammy Award for Best R&B Song.

In January 1965, each group member received a check for $100,000 in earnings from the previous year. They all used part of this money to purchase a new home for their families together on the same street, allowing them to leave the projects.

=== Impact ===
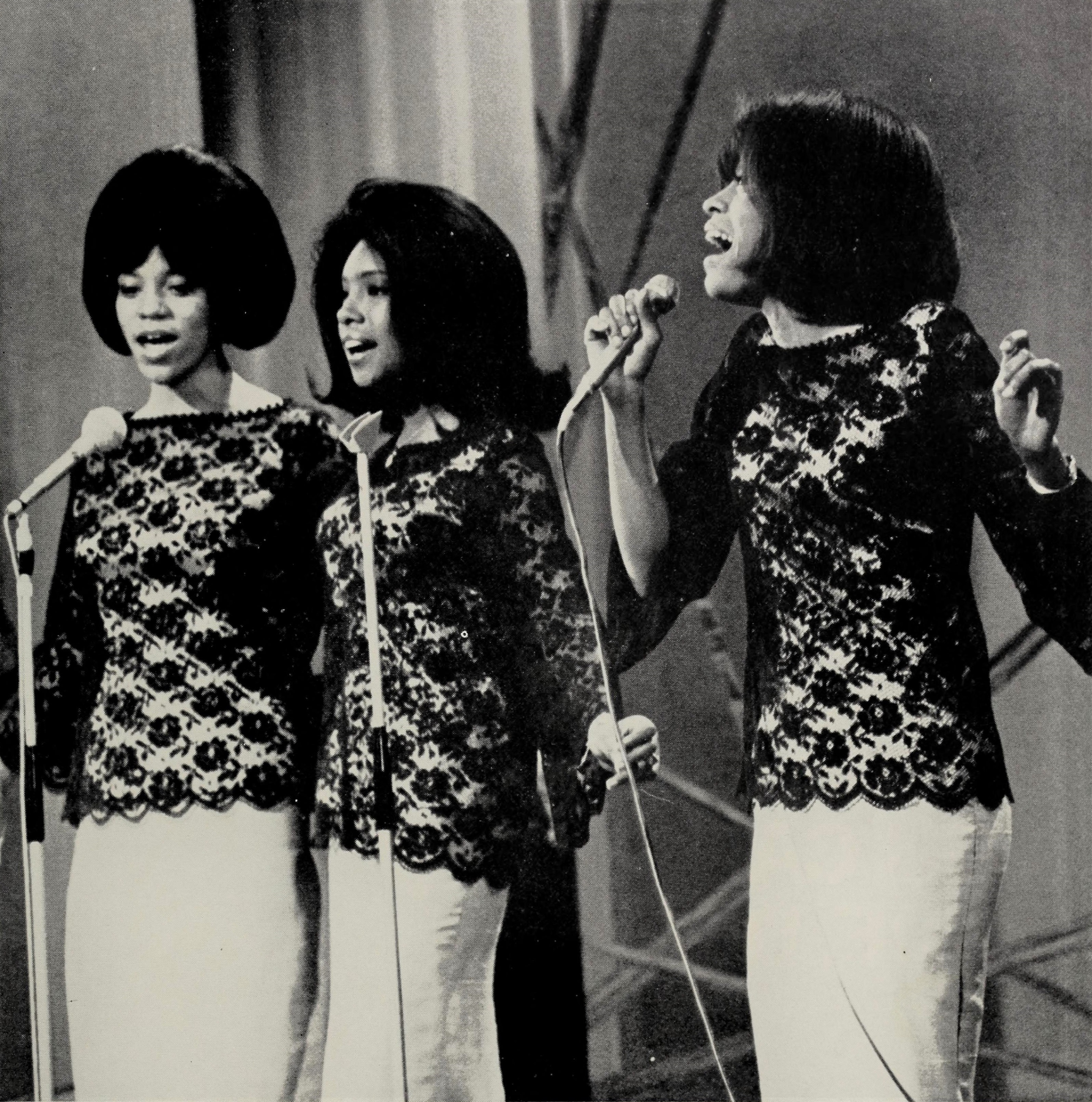
The Supremes on the cover of Cash Box, 31 July 1965

The Supremes deliberately embraced a more glamorous image than previous black performers. Much of this was accomplished at the behest of Motown chief Berry Gordy and Maxine Powell, who ran Motown's in-house finishing school and Artist Development department. Unlike many of her contemporaries, Ross sang in a thin, calm voice, and her vocal styling was matched by having all three women embellish their femininity instead of imitating the qualities of male groups. Eschewing plain appearances and basic dance routines, the Supremes appeared onstage in detailed make-up and high-fashion gowns and wigs, and performed graceful choreography created by Motown choreographer Cholly Atkins. Powell told the group to "be prepared to perform before kings and queens." Gordy wanted the Supremes, like all of his performers, to be equally appealing to black and white audiences.

Publications such as Time and The Detroit News commented on the Supremes' polished presentation. In a May 1965 profile of rock music, Time called the Supremes "the reigning female rock 'n' roll group" and said that Ross "is greatly envied for the torchy, come-hither purr in her voice." Arnold S. Hirsch of The Detroit News said about the Supremes: "they don't scream or wail incoherently. An adult can understand nine out of every 10 words they sing. And, most astounding, melody can be clearly detected in every song." Encyclopedia Britannica commented that the Supremes' hit singles "sounded modern, upwardly mobile, and stylishly sensual in a way that appealed equally to adults and teens of all persuasions."

By 1965, the Supremes were international stars. They toured the world, becoming almost as popular abroad as they were in the US. Almost immediately after their initial number 1 hits, they recorded songs for motion picture soundtracks, appeared in the 1965 film Beach Ball, and endorsed dozens of products, at one point having their own brand of bread. By the end of 1966, their number 1 hits included "I Hear a Symphony", "You Can't Hurry Love" and "You Keep Me Hangin' On". That year the group also released The Supremes A' Go-Go, which on October 22 became the first album by an all-female group to reach number 1 on the US Billboard 200, knocking the Beatles' Revolver out of the top spot. Because the Supremes were popular with white audiences as well as with black ones, Gordy had the group perform at renowned supper clubs such as the Copacabana in New York. Broadway and pop standards were incorporated into their repertoire alongside their own hit songs. As a result, the Supremes became one of the first black musical acts to achieve complete and sustained crossover success. Black rock-and-roll musicians of the 1950s had seen many of their original hit tunes covered by white musicians, with these covers usually achieving more fame and sales success than the originals. The Supremes' success, however, counteracted this trend. Featuring three group members who were marketed for their individual personalities (a move unprecedented at the time) and Diana Ross's pop-friendly voice, the Supremes broke down racial barriers with rock-and-roll songs underpinned by R&B stylings. The group became extremely popular both domestically and abroad, becoming one of the first black musical acts to appear regularly on television programs such as Hullabaloo, The Hollywood Palace, The Della Reese Show, and, most notably, The Ed Sullivan Show, on which they made 17 appearances. In 2003, Fred Bronson wrote that in 1959, when the Supremes formed as the Primettes, "no one could have predicted they would become the most successful American singing group of all time."

=== Changes ===
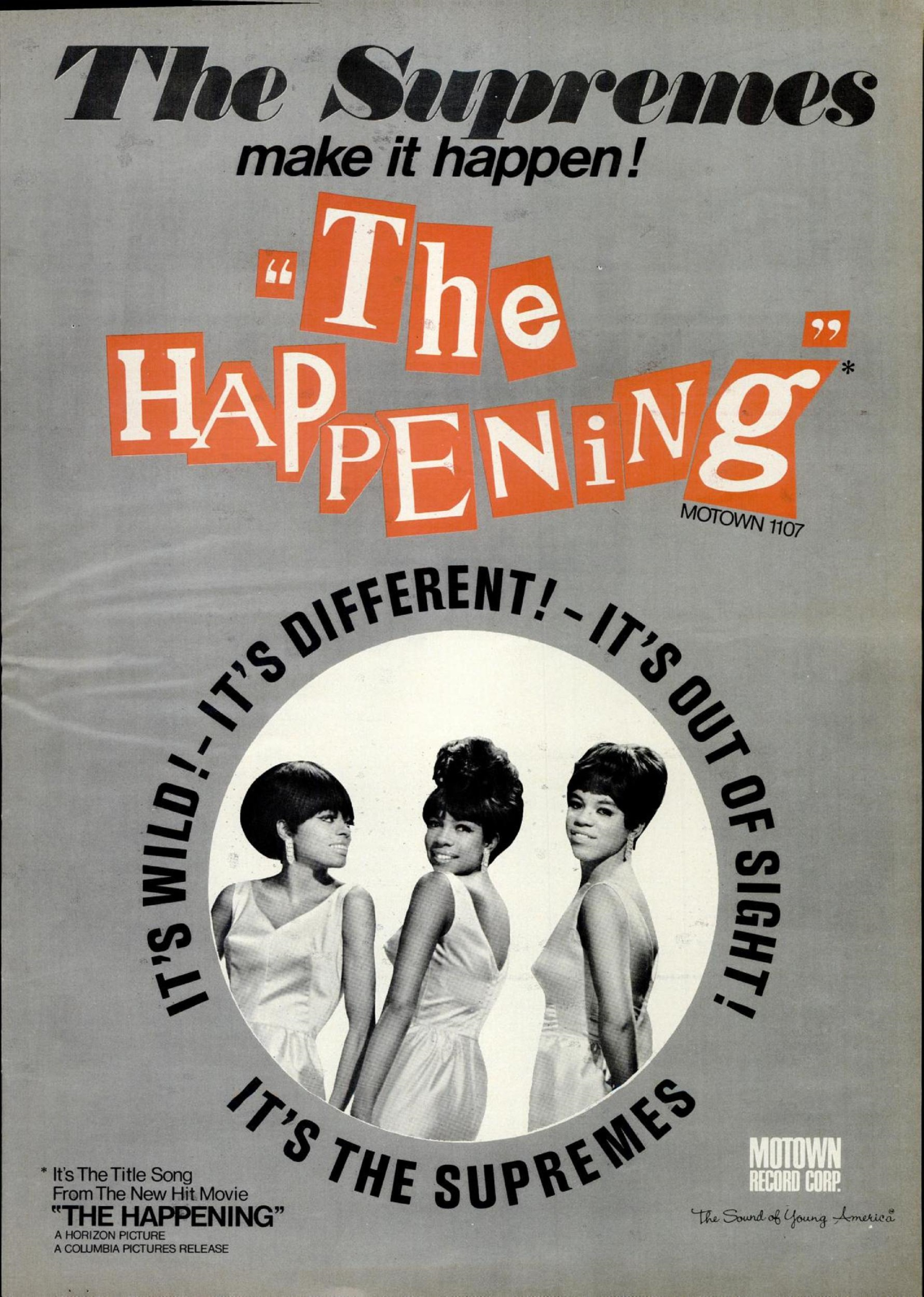
Billboard advertisement for The Supremes' tenth number 1 single, "The Happening", April 22, 1967

Problems within the group and within Motown Records' stable of performers led to tension among the members of the Supremes. Many of the other Motown performers felt that Berry Gordy was lavishing too much attention upon the group and upon Ross, in particular. In early 1967, the name of the act was officially changed briefly to "the Supremes with Diana Ross" before changing again to "Diana Ross & the Supremes" by mid-summer. The Miracles had become "Smokey Robinson & the Miracles" two years prior. The fall of 1967 saw Martha & the Vandellas become "Martha Reeves & the Vandellas". Having learned that Ross would receive top billing, David Ruffin lobbied, unsuccessfully, to have the Temptations renamed as "David Ruffin & the Temptations", although Gordy maintained that because they would be providing two acts, a lead singer and a group, Motown could demand more money for live bookings.

The Supremes' name change fueled already present rumors of a solo career for Ross and contributed to the professional and personal dismantling of the group. In fact, Gordy intended to replace Ross with Barbara Randolph as early as the fall of 1966, but changed his mind and instead kept Ross in the group for several more years.

As Ross became the focal point of the Supremes, Ballard suffered from depression and began to drink excessively, gaining weight until she could no longer comfortably wear many of her stage outfits. During this turbulent period, Ballard relied heavily upon the advice of group mate Mary Wilson, with whom she had maintained a close friendship. Wilson, while outwardly demure and neutral in hopes of keeping the group stable, privately advised Ballard that Ross and Gordy were eager to oust Ballard.

By 1967, Ballard would not show up for recording dates, or would arrive at shows too inebriated to perform. For some early 1967 shows, she was replaced by Marlene Barrow (a member of the Motown backup group The Andantes). Looking for a more permanent replacement, Gordy once again thought of Barbara Randolph, possibly believing that Randolph could be groomed as lead singer for the group once it was decided to take Ross solo. However, Ross did not receive Randolph well. In April 1967, Gordy then contacted Cindy Birdsong, a member of Patti LaBelle & the Blue Belles who superficially resembled Ballard, with plans to bring her in as Ballard's replacement. He made his plans clear to Ballard and her group mates at a mid-April meeting, and Birdsong was brought in to begin rehearsals. Gordy did not fire Ballard outright at that time, asking Ballard instead to quit on her own.

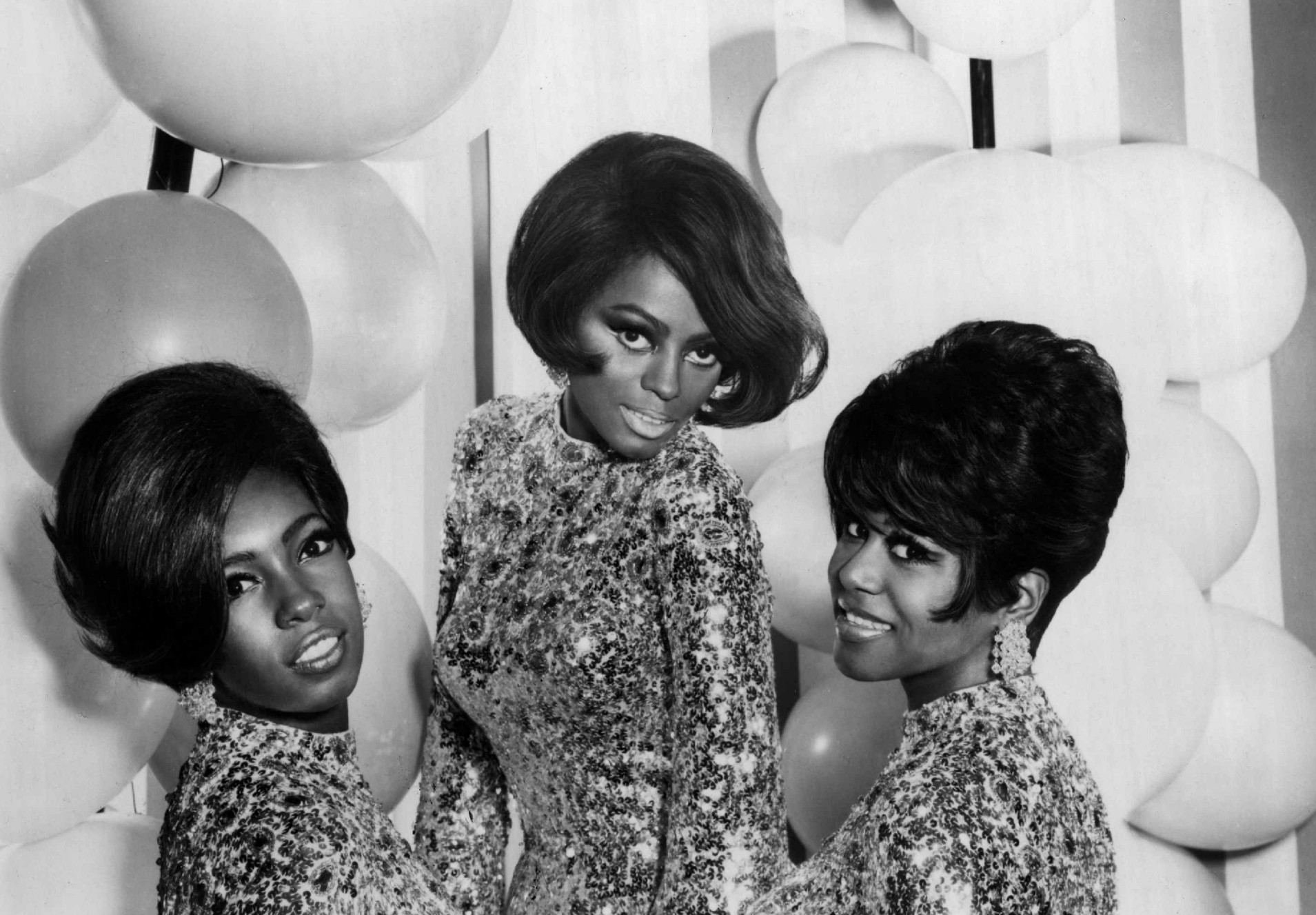
Cindy Birdsong (right)

Birdsong first appeared with the Supremes in Ballard's place at a benefit concert at the Hollywood Bowl on April 29, 1967. Following the performance, Gordy quickly learned that Birdsong was still contractually committed to the Blue Belles when that group's lawyers filed an injunction against him. In May, Ballard returned for what she believed was a probationary period, although in reality it was a stopgap measure until Gordy was able to buy out Birdsong's contract. During May and June, knowing that she was one step away from being dismissed, Ballard made an attempt to toe the line, slimming down and showing up to commitments on time and sober. Despite this, Birdsong was secretly traveling with the Supremes, studying their routines.

On June 29, 1967, the group returned to the Flamingo Hotel in Las Vegas as "Diana Ross & the Supremes". The first two days of the Flamingo engagement went by smoothly. On July 1, when reporting for makeup and wardrobe before their first show of the evening, Ballard discovered an extra set of gowns and costumes that had been brought along for Cindy Birdsong. Angered, Ballard performed the first concert of the night inebriated, leading to an embarrassing on-stage incident in which her stomach was revealed when she purposely thrust it forward during a dance routine. Enraged, Gordy ordered her back to Detroit and permanently dismissed her from the group. Birdsong officially assumed her place during the second July 1 show.

Ballard's release from Motown was made final on February 22, 1968, when she received a one-time payment of US$139,804.94 in royalties and earnings. She attempted a solo career with ABC Records, and was forced to formally reject a solo contract offered by Motown as part of her settlement. Ballard's two 1968 singles failed to chart and her solo album was shelved. In 1971, Ballard sued Motown for $8.7 million, claiming that Gordy and Diana Ross had conspired to force her out of the group; the judge ruled in favor of Motown. Ballard eventually sank into poverty and died abruptly on February 22, 1976, from a cardiac arrest caused by a coronary thrombosis at the age of 32.

=== Ross's departure ===
Holland–Dozier–Holland left Motown in early 1968 after a dispute with the label over royalties and profit sharing. From "Reflections" in 1967 to "The Weight" in 1969, only six out of the eleven released singles reached the Top 20; 1968's "Love Child" made it to number 1. Due to the tension within the group and stringent touring schedules, neither Mary Wilson nor Cindy Birdsong appear on many of these singles; they were replaced on these recordings by session singers such as the Andantes. The changes within the group and their decreasing sales were signs of changes within the music industry. The gospel-based soul of female performers such as Aretha Franklin had eclipsed the Supremes' pop-based sound, which had by now evolved to include more middle-of-the-road material. In a cultural climate now influenced more than ever by countercultural movements such as the Black Panther Party, the Supremes found themselves attacked for not being "black enough", and lost ground in the black music market.

In mid-1968, Motown initiated a number of high-profile collaborations for the Supremes with their old colleagues, the Temptations. By 1969, the label began plans for a Diana Ross solo career. A number of candidates—most notably Syreeta Wright—were considered to replace Ross. After seeing 24-year-old Jean Terrell perform with her brother Ernie in Florida, Berry Gordy decided on Ross' replacement. Terrell was signed to Motown and began recording the first post-Ross Supremes songs with Wilson and Birdsong during the day, while Wilson and Birdsong toured with Ross at night. At the same time, Ross began to make her first solo recordings. On November 2, 1969, Ross's solo career was first reported by the Detroit Free Press.

"Someday We'll Be Together" was recorded with the intent of releasing it as the first solo single for Diana Ross. Desiring a final Supremes number 1 record, Gordy instead had the song released as a Diana Ross & the Supremes single, despite the fact that neither Wilson nor Birdsong sang on the record. "Someday We'll Be Together" hit number 1 on the American pop charts, becoming not only the Supremes' twelfth and final number 1 hit, but also the final number 1 hit of the 1960s. This single also would mark the Supremes' final television appearance together with Ross, performing on The Ed Sullivan Show on December 21, 1969.

=== 1970s ===
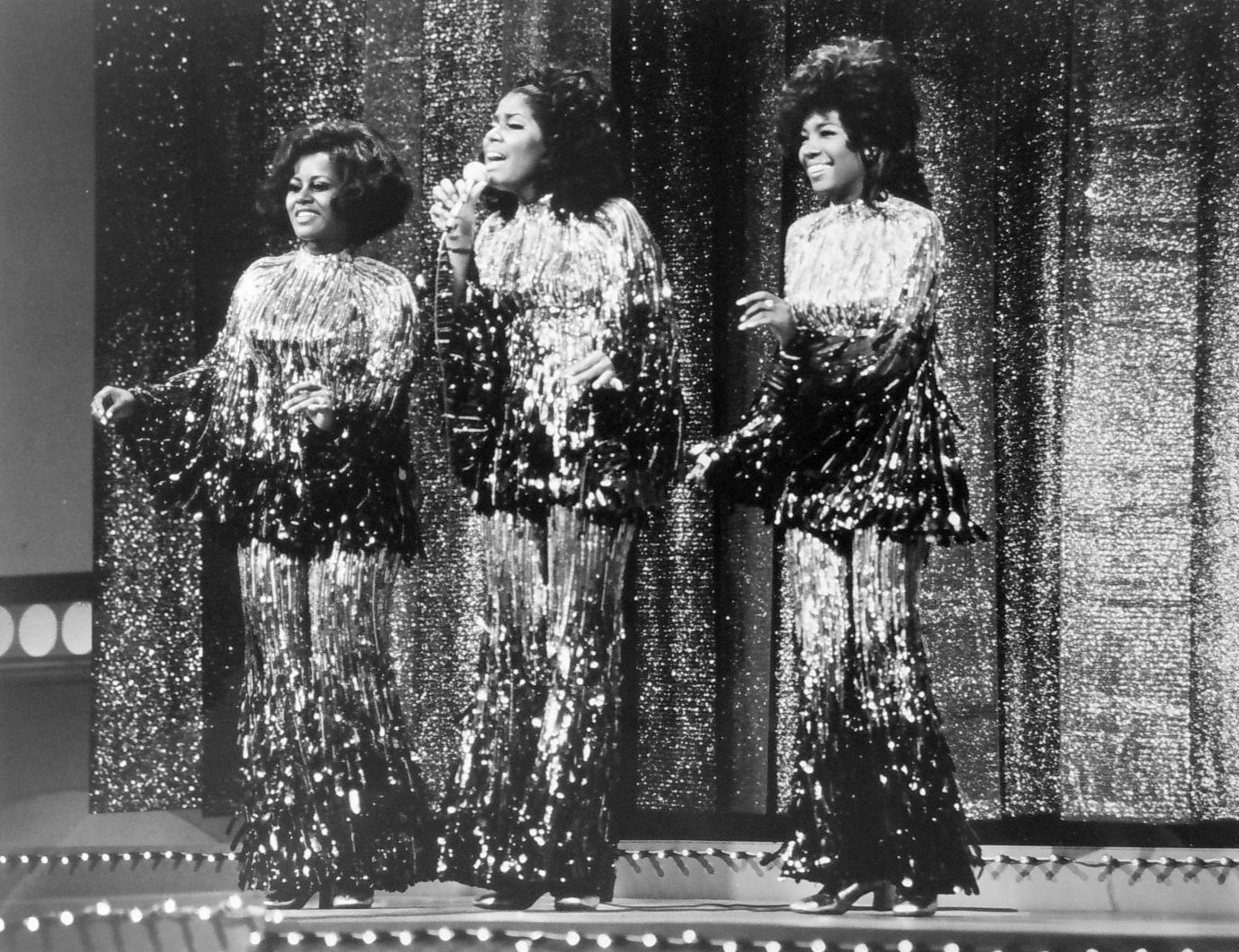
The Supremes performing on The Smokey Robinson Show in 1970

Diana Ross & the Supremes gave their final performance on January 14, 1970, at the Frontier Hotel in Las Vegas. A live recording of the performance was released later that year in a double-LP box set titled Farewell. At the final performance, the replacement for Diana Ross, Jean Terrell, was introduced. According to Mary Wilson, after this performance, Berry Gordy wanted to replace Terrell with Syreeta Wright. Wilson refused, leading to Gordy stating that he was washing his hands of the group thereafter. After the Frontier Hotel performance, Ross officially began her career as a solo performer. Mary Wilson and Cindy Birdsong continued working with Jean Terrell on the first post-Ross Supremes album, Right On.

The Terrell-led Supremes—now rebranded as "the Supremes;" known unofficially at first as "the New Supremes", and in later years informally called "The '70s Supremes"—scored hits including "Up the Ladder to the Roof", "Stoned Love" and "Nathan Jones" with producer Frank Wilson, the former two being the group's final top ten hits in the US while all three aforementioned singles hit the top ten in the UK. A cover of "River Deep – Mountain High", featuring the Four Tops, and produced by Ashford & Simpson, and "Floy Joy", produced for them by Smokey Robinson, became their final top 20 hits. "Floy Joy" is notable for being the only Supremes hit where Wilson shared lead vocals.

Motown, by then moving from Detroit to Los Angeles to break into motion pictures, put only limited effort into promoting the Supremes' new material, and their popularity and sales began to wane. Cindy Birdsong left the group in April 1972, after recording the Floy Joy album, to start a family; her replacement was Lynda Laurence, a former member of Stevie Wonder's backup group, Third Generation (a predecessor to Wonderlove). Jimmy Webb was hired to produce the group's next LP, The Supremes Produced and Arranged by Jimmy Webb, but the album and its only single "I Guess I'll Miss the Man" failed to make an impact on the Billboard pop chart, with the single peaking at number 85 on November 24, 1972.

In early 1973, the Stevie Wonder-produced "Bad Weather" peaked at number 87 on the US pop charts and number 37 in the UK. Laurence left to start a family, so Cindy Birdsong returned to the group.

Dismayed by this poor-performing record and the lack of promotional support from Motown, Jean Terrell left the group and was replaced by Scherrie Payne, the sister of Invictus Records recording artist Freda Payne. The group's strained relationship with Motown continued; Birdsong told journalist Peter McDonald in 1974 that 'we've had problems with Motown... at this point if a better opportunity with another company comes along we'll seriously consider it.'

Between the 1973 departures of Laurence and Terrell and the first Supremes single with Scherrie Payne, "He's My Man", a disco single on which Payne and Wilson shared lead vocal, Motown was slow in producing contracts for Payne and the returning Birdsong. Before the release of the album in 1975, the Supremes remained a popular live act, and continued touring overseas, particularly in the UK and Japan. The group's new recordings were not as successful as their earlier releases, although "He's My Man" from the album The Supremes was a popular disco hit in 1975. In 1976, Birdsong left again and was replaced by Susaye Greene, another former member of Wonderlove.

This final version of the Supremes released two albums, both of which reunited the Supremes with Holland-Dozier-Holland: High Energy, which includes Birdsong on all of the tracks, and Mary, Scherrie & Susaye. In 1976, the Supremes released "I'm Gonna Let My Heart Do the Walking", their final Top 40 hit on the Billboard Hot 100.

On June 12, 1977, the Supremes performed their farewell concert at the Drury Lane Theater in London as Wilson made her exit for a solo career, with Payne and Greene selecting Joyce Vincent to round out the trio as a new third member. Instead, Motown decided that without any original members, the Supremes would be disbanded.

== Musical style ==
The band's music has been classed as girl group, pop-soul, and soul. Their recorded catalog includes love songs and sentimental ballads.

== Legacy ==
=== Works inspired by the Supremes ===
The album cover seen in the 2006 film Dreamgirls, left, strongly resembles the 1969 album cover for Diana Ross & the Supremes' Cream of the Crop, right.

Several fictional works have been published and produced that are based in part on the career of the group. The 1976 film Sparkle features the story of a Supremes-like singing trio called "Sister & the Sisters" from Harlem, New York. The film's score was composed by Curtis Mayfield, and the soundtrack album by Aretha Franklin was a commercial success. A remake of Sparkle was in development in the early 2000s with R&B singer Aaliyah as the lead, but the project was shelved when Aaliyah died in 2001. The Sparkle remake was eventually released in August 2012 and starred Jordin Sparks and Whitney Houston, in her final film role.

On December 21, 1981, the Tony Award-winning musical Dreamgirls opened at the Imperial Theatre on Broadway and ran for 1,522 performances. The musical, loosely based on the history of the Supremes, follows the story of the Dreams, an all-female singing trio from Chicago who become music superstars. Several of the characters in the play are analogues of real-life Supremes/Motown counterparts, with the story focusing upon the Florence Ballard doppelgänger Effie White. While influenced by the Supremes' and Motown's music, the songs in the play are a broader mix of R&B/soul and Broadway music. Mary Wilson loved the musical, but Diana Ross was reportedly angered by it and refused to see it.

=== Awards and followers ===
The Supremes were twice nominated for a Grammy Award—for Best Rhythm & Blues Recording ("Baby Love", 1965) and Best Contemporary Rock & Roll Group Vocal Performance ("Stop! In the Name of Love", 1966)—but never won an award in competition. Three of their songs were added to the Grammy Hall of Fame: "Where Did Our Love Go" and "You Keep Me Hangin' On" (both 1999) and "Stop! In the Name of Love" (2001). The group (Ross, Wilson and Ballard) was named as one of eight recipients to receive a Grammy Lifetime Achievement Award at the 65th Annual Grammy Awards in 2023.

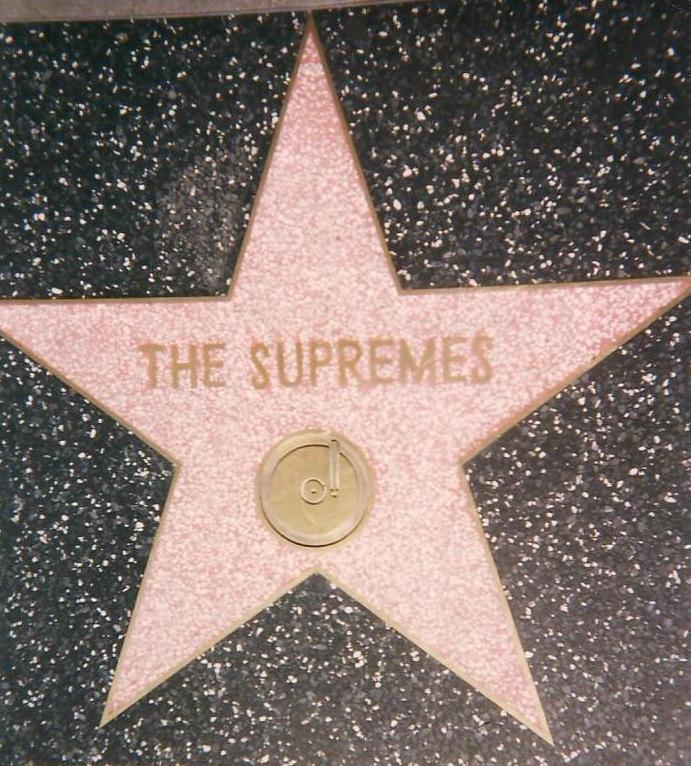
Star on Hollywood Walk of Fame at 7060 Hollywood Blvd

"Stop! In the Name of Love" and "You Can't Hurry Love" are among the Rock and Roll Hall of Fame's 500 Songs that Shaped Rock and Roll. The Ross-Wilson-Ballard lineup was inducted into the Rock and Roll Hall of Fame in 1988, received a star on the Hollywood Walk of Fame in 1994, and entered into the Vocal Group Hall of Fame in 1998. In 2004, Rolling Stone placed the group at number 97 on their list of the "100 Greatest Artists of All Time". The Supremes are notable for the influences they have had on black girl groups who have succeeded them in popular music, such as The Three Degrees, The Emotions, The Pointer Sisters, En Vogue, TLC, Destiny's Child and Cleopatra. "The Beatles were there," said Madonna of her childhood, "but I was more eager about The Supremes. I was really into girl groups."

=== Reunions ===
There was continual fan interest – and hopes – throughout the 1970s and into the early 1980s of a Supremes reunion, ideally with new music and a tour. In 1982, around the time that Motown reunited all of the Temptations, it was rumored Motown would also reunite the Supremes. The 1974 line-up of the Supremes (Wilson, Birdsong and Payne) was considered for this reunion which was to include new recordings and a tour. Under advisement from Berry Gordy, Wilson declined to join, and the idea was scrapped.

Ross briefly reunited with Wilson and Birdsong to perform "Someday We'll Be Together" on the Motown 25: Yesterday, Today, Forever television special, taped on March 25, 1983, and broadcast on NBC on May 16, 1983. At the finale of the show, a montage of classic Supremes and Diana Ross solo video clips was shown. Ross walked through the audience to the stage while singing her 1970 solo hit "Ain't No Mountain High Enough", then after a short speech where Ross says "...But its not about the people who leave Motown that's important, but it's about the people who come back...and tonight everybody came back", begins the chorus of "Someday", still solo on stage. 20 seconds later Birdsong and Wilson walked on stage, from left and right, to flank Ross, now all three singing the song's chorus, and thereby reuniting the famous trio for the first time since 1970. But just 23 seconds later (including Ross identifying Wilson and Birdsong to the audience), the trio began to be joined on stage, one-by-one, by many other prominent Motown artists (first by Smokey Robinson, followed by the Temptations, then a multitude of others, including Michael Jackson, Stevie Wonder, and Berry Gordy), all singing an extended chorus of the song. Eventually an estimated 40–50 people were all on stage; the camera pulled back to a wide-angle view to accommodate the large on-stage crowd, rendering the Supremes members themselves mostly difficult to discern. Ross and the stage multitude then closeout the show to credits while singing the chorus to Ross' 1970 first solo hit "Reach Out and Touch (Somebody's Hand)". This blunted the trio's well-awaited reunion, which is seen for only just over six minutes on the show (including credits).

In 2000, plans were made for Ross to join Wilson and Birdsong for a planned "Diana Ross & the Supremes: Return to Love" reunion tour. However, Wilson passed on the idea, because while the promoters offered Ross $15 million to perform, Wilson was offered $4 million and Birdsong less than $1 million. Ross herself offered to double the amounts both Wilson and Birdsong had originally been offered, but while Birdsong accepted, Wilson remained adamant and, as a result, the deal fell through with both former Supremes. Eventually, the "Return to Love" tour went on as scheduled, but with Payne and Laurence joining Ross, though none of the three had ever been in the group at the same time and neither Payne nor Laurence had sung on any of the original hit recordings that they were now singing live. Susaye Greene was also considered for this tour, but refused to audition for it. The music critics cried foul and many fans were disappointed by both this and the shows' high ticket prices. Though the shows did well in larger markets including near-capacity at the opening night in Philadelphia and a sellout at Madison Square Garden in New York, it under performed in smaller/medium markets as shows began to be considered more a Ross solo tour rather than a genuine Supremes group effort. The tour was canceled after playing only half the dates on itinerary.

The original hit-making Supremes trio of Ross, Wilson, and Ballard never reunited following Ross' 1970 departure. With the deaths of Ballard on February 22, 1976 (at age 32) and Wilson on February 8, 2021, an in-person reunion of that classic 1959–1967 lineup is not possible. The 1983 Motown 25 television special remains the only reunion of Ross, Wilson, and Birdsong as the 1967–1970 Supremes, however brief and fan-disappointing.

=== Post-Supremes groups ===
In 1986, Jean Terrell, Scherrie Payne and Lynda Laurence began to perform as the Former Ladies of the Supremes, or FLOS. When Terrell quit in 1992, Sundray Tucker, Laurence's sister, stepped in for a short time, but was replaced by Freddi Poole in 1996. More recently in September 2009, Poole was replaced by Joyce Vincent, formerly of Tony Orlando and Dawn. In 2017, Laurence left and was replaced by Greene.

In 1977, last original and founding member Mary Wilson decided to disband The Supremes and forge a solo career. Wilson hired Kaaren Ragland, Karen Jackson, and Debbie Sharpe, to perform as background singers during concert tours in the United Kingdom, Europe, South East Asia, and Australia. They performed with Wilson from 1978 through the mid-1980s, aiding her in fulfilling contractual obligations related to The Supremes and avoiding potential legal action from Motown, as Wilson detailed in her 1990 book.

In 1989, Kaaren Ragland founded a group known as The Sounds of the Supremes. Ragland asserts her affiliation with the Supremes based on her performances alongside Mary Wilson. However, she was never signed by Motown, her performances with Wilson occurred after the Supremes' disbandment in 1977, and she is not recognized as an official member of the Supremes.

In 1996, Mary Wilson sued former group mates Kaaren Ragland, Hollis Paysuer, Scherrie Payne, Lynda Laurence, and their managers for trademark infringement of the Supremes name. In 1999, the 9th U.S. Circuit Court of Appeals ruled against Wilson, stating that Motown owns the name and had allowed Former Ladies of the Supremes and Sounds of the Supremes to use the name.

== Personnel ==
- Mary Wilson (1959–1977, 1983; died 2021)
- Diana Ross (1959–1970, 1983, 2000)
- Florence Ballard (1959–1967; died 1976)
- Betty McGlown (1959–1960; died 2008)
- Barbara Martin (1960–1962; died 2020)
- Cindy Birdsong (1967–1972, 1973–1976, 1983)
- Jean Terrell (1970–1973)
- Lynda Laurence (1972–1973, 2000)
- Scherrie Payne (1973–1977, 2000)
- Susaye Greene (1976–1977)

== Discography ==
Studio albums

- Meet The Supremes (1962)
- Where Did Our Love Go (1964)
- A Bit of Liverpool (1964)
- The Supremes Sing Country, Western and Pop (1965)
- We Remember Sam Cooke (1965)
- More Hits by The Supremes (1965)
- Merry Christmas (1965)
- I Hear a Symphony (1966)
- The Supremes A' Go-Go (1966)
- The Supremes Sing Holland–Dozier–Holland (1967)
- The Supremes Sing Rodgers & Hart (1967)
- Reflections (1968)
- Diana Ross & the Supremes Sing and Perform "Funny Girl" (1968)
- Diana Ross & the Supremes Join the Temptations (1968)
- Love Child (1968)
- Let the Sunshine In (1969)
- Together (1969)
- Cream of the Crop (1969)
- Right On (1970)
- The Magnificent 7 (1970)
- New Ways but Love Stays (1970)
- The Return of the Magnificent Seven (1971)
- Touch (1971)
- Dynamite (1971)
- Floy Joy (1972)
- The Supremes Produced and Arranged by Jimmy Webb (1972)
- The Supremes (1975)
- High Energy (1976)
- Mary, Scherrie & Susaye (1976)

== Filmography ==
- T.A.M.I. Show (1965) (concert film)
- Beach Ball (1965)
- The Supremes In The Orient (1966) (28 minute short film directed by Berry Gordy documenting the group's tour in Asia the same year and intended as a TV special)

== Television ==
- Tarzan (1968)
- T.C.B. (1968)
- G.I.T. on Broadway (1969)

== Videography ==
- Reflections: The Definitive Performances (1964–1969) (2006)
- Greatest Hits: Live in Amsterdam (2006)

== See also ==
- List of artists who reached number one in the United States
- List of best-selling girl groups
- List of Rock and Roll Hall of Fame inductees
