= No Matter What Sign You Are =

- Side A of the Canadian single

Single by Diana Ross & the Supremes

from the album Let the Sunshine In
- B-side: "The Young Folks"
- Released: May 9, 1969
- Genre: Funk, psychedelic pop, soul
- Length: 2:38
- Label: Motown; M 1148
- Songwriters: Berry Gordy, Jr., Henry Cosby
- Producers: Berry Gordy, Jr., Henry Cosby

Diana Ross & the Supremes singles chronology
"The Composer" (1969)	"No Matter What Sign You Are" (1969)	"I Second That Emotion" (1969)

Let the Sunshine In track listing
- 12 tracks Side one: 1. "The Composer"; 2. "Everyday People"; 3. "No Matter What Sign You Are"; 4. "Hey Western Union Man"; 5. "What Becomes of the Brokenhearted"; 6. "I'm Livin' in Shame"; Side two: 7. Medley: "Aquarius/Let the Sunshine In (The Flesh Failures)"; 8. "Let the Music Play"; 9. "With a Child's Heart"; 10. "Discover Me (and You'll Discover Love)"; 11. "Will This Be the Day"; 12. "I'm So Glad I Got Somebody (Like You Around)"

"No Matter What Sign You Are" is a song released for Diana Ross & the Supremes by the Motown label.

== Background ==
Originally intended to be Diana Ross & the Supremes' final single before the departure of Diana Ross and penned by Berry Gordy, the song failed to fulfil Gordy's expectations as the single did not reach the top 20 in either the US and UK, peaking at 31 and 37 respectively in July 1969. The song released as the third single from Let the Sunshine In. As with most singles released under this billing of the group, session singers perform the backing vocals on the recorded single as opposed to Supremes group members at the time, Mary Wilson and Cindy Birdsong.

== Personnel ==
- Lead vocals by Diana Ross
- Background vocals by the Blackberries (Venetta Fields, Clydie King, and Sherlie Matthews), Mary Wilson, Cindy Birdsong, Melissa Manchester
- Instrumentation by the Funk Brothers
  - Bass by James Jamerson and Bob Babbitt
  - Electric sitar by Dennis Coffey
- Drums by Aynsley Dunbar
- Guitar by Robert White, Eddie Willis, Paul Warren and Ray Parker Jr.
- Keyboards and Mellotron by David Foster
- Arraged by Paul Riser and McKinley Jackson

== Track listing ==
- 7" single (9 May 1969) (United States/United Kingdom/Netherlands)
1. "No Matter What Sign You Are" – 2:38
2. "The Young Folks" – 2:29

== Chart history ==
Chart (1969)	Peak position
Australia (Kent Music Report)	33
Canada Top Singles (RPM)	29
Netherlands (Dutch Top 40 Tipparade)	2
UK Singles (Official Charts)	37
UK R&B (Record Mirror)	10
US Billboard Hot 100	31
US Hot R&B/Hip-Hop Songs (Billboard)	17
US Cashbox Top 100	27
US Cashbox R&B	20
US Record World 100 Top Pops	25
US Record World Top 50 R&B	17

== Later versions and samples ==
It was recorded in 1983 by Russell Grant and the Starlettes.

It was sampled in 1989 by the Beastie Boys on "Shake Your Rump" from their acclaimed second album Paul's Boutique.
