= Live at the Sands =

Mary Wilson Live at the Sands

Video by Mary Wilson
- Released: 2006
- Recorded: 2005
- Venue: Copa Room at Sands Hotel and Casino
- Studio: Live/Recorded
- Genre: R&B
- Length: 1h 15m
- Label: Paradise MediaWerks
- Producer: Richard Duryea

Live at the Sands is a live DVD by Mary Wilson, recorded at the Copa Room of the Sands Hotel and Casino in Las Vegas and released in 2006.

== Track listings ==
1. "I'm Every Woman"
2. "Love Child"
3. "My World Is Empty Without You"
4. "Reflections"
5. "You Can't Hurry Love"
6. "Come See About Me"
7. "Back in My Arms Again"
8. "Good Lovin'"
9. "Body and Soul"
10. "Fields of Gold"
11. "You Are So Beautiful"
12. "Bad Case of Lovin' You"
13. "Can't Get Enough of Your Love/Take Me in Your Arms"
14. "Baby Love"
15. "Stop! In the Name of Love"
16. "You Keep Me Hangin' On"
17. "U"
18. "One Night With You"
19. "Walk the Line"
20. "Someday We'll Be Together"
21. "(I Can't Get No) Satisfaction"/"Brown Sugar"
22. "Hero"

== Personnel ==
- Mary Wilson - lead vocals
- Parnell Marcano - background vocals
- Iris Parker - background vocals
- Carl Jenkins - background vocals
- Donzel Davis - drums
- Ray Parnell - guitar and vocals
- Michael Lomas - bass guitar
- Peter Radd - keyboards
- Mark Zeir - keyboards

== See also ==
- Live at the Sands (Before Frank)
- Sinatra at the Sands
- The Sounds of '66
- Lena Horne at the Sands

== Production credits ==
- Mary Wilson - Executive Producer
- Richard Duryea - Producer
