= Promises Kept (The Supremes album) =

Studio album by The Supremes
- Released: 1971
- Recorded: June 1971 – January 1972
- Genre: Pop/R&B
- Label: Motown M-746 (Not released)
- Producer: Ashford & Simpson; Frank Wilson; Henry Cosby; Clay McMurray; Bobby Taylor et al.

The Supremes chronology
| Dynamite (1971) | Promises Kept (1971) | Floy Joy (1972) |

Promises Kept is an unreleased album by The Supremes, recorded during the latter half of 1971 with multiple producers. Ultimately, the project was shelved by Motown in favor of a different set, Floy Joy, produced entirely by Smokey Robinson the following year. The idea for the title came from Supreme Mary Wilson who said that "I'd heard the phrase and loved it. I wanted to use it on the next album."

Assigned the catalogue number M-746 and originally scheduled for a December 1971 release, no finished track listing is known to exist from the 19 songs recorded for the project. Five songs were released in 2002 on The '70s Anthology CD while another 13 appeared on the 2006 boxset This Is the Story: The '70s Albums, Vol. 1 – 1970–1973: The Jean Terrell Years.

== Songs recorded ==
1. "Oh My Poor Baby" (Gloria Jones, Pam Sawyer) – 2:48
2. "Make It with You" (David Gates) – 3:19
  - Originally recorded by Bread.
3. "I'll Let Him Know I Love Him" (Jones, Sawyer) – 4:02
4. "Never Can Say Goodbye" (Clifton Davis) – 3:18
  - given and recorded by The Jackson 5.
5. "Walk with Me, Talk with Me Darling" (John Glover, Clay McMurray, James Dean) – 2:33
  - Tracks 1 – 5 Released on "The '70s Anthology" (2002)
6. "Tears Left Over" (Leonard Caston, Jr., Nickolas Ashford) – 3:37
  - Working title: "Bet I Can Wash Away"
7. "Eleanor Rigby" (John Lennon, Paul McCartney) – 2:30
  - Originally recorded by The Beatles
8. "I Ain't Got the Love of the One I Love" (Nick Zesses, Dino Fekaris) – 3:19
  - Originally assigned to David Ruffin.
9. "Can't Get You Out of My Mind" (Ashford, Valerie Simpson) – 2:59
10. "Take a Look Inside" (McMurray, Brenda Wane, Steve Bowden) – 3:36
11. "Still Water (Love)" (Wilson, Smokey Robinson) – 2:56 – led by Mary Wilson
  - Originally recorded by The Four Tops.
12. "Take Your Dreams Back" (Cosby, Dean, Glover) – 3:18
  - Working title: "Free to Be Lonely"
13. "I Don't Want to Own You (I Just Want to Love You)" (R. Dean Taylor, Mike Valvano) – 2:55
14. "Chained to Yesterday" (Beatrice Verdi, Sawyer, Cosby) – 3:08
  - Originally assigned to Diana Ross & The Supremes
15. "If I Were Your Woman" (Jones, Sawyer, McMurray) – 2:46
  - Originally recorded by Gladys Knight & the Pips.
16. "I Ain't That Easy to Lose" (Jones, Sawyer) – 3:51
  - Originally assigned to Gladys Knight & the Pips.
17. "And I Thought You Loved Me" (Zesses, Fekaris) – 4:18
18. "It's Too Late" (Carole King, Toni Stern) – 4:27
  - Originally recorded by Carole King.
  - Tracks 6 – 18 Released on "This Is the Story: The '70s Albums, Vol. 1 – 1970–1973: The Jean Terrell Years" (2007)
19. "All I Need" (Frank Wilson, E. Holland, R. Dean Taylor)
  - Originally recorded by The Temptations.
  - Track 19 Released on "Motown Sings Motown Treasures"

== Personnel ==
- Jean Terrell – lead vocals, background vocals
- Mary Wilson – lead vocals, background vocals
- Cindy Birdsong – background vocals
- The Andantes (Louvain Demps, Jackie Hicks, Marlene Barrow) – additional background vocals
- Gloria Jones & Pamela Sawyer (Producers, tracks 1, 3)
- Henry Cosby (Producer tracks 2, 8, 12, 15)
- Clay McMurray (Producer tracks 4, 5, 10, 16)
- Frank Wilson (Producer track 6)
- Bobby Taylor (Producers tracks 7, 11, 17, 18)
- Ashford & Simpson (Producers track 9)
- R. Dean Taylor & Mike Valvano (Producers track 13)
- The Clan (Producers track 14)
