= Walk the Line (disambiguation) =

Walk the Line is a 2005 American biographical drama film directed by James Mangold.

Walk the Line may also refer to:

- Walk the Line (Mary Wilson album), a 1992 album released by former Supremes member on the independent CEO Records label
- Walk the Line (soundtrack), a Grammy Award-winning soundtrack from the film
- "Walk the Line", a song by Iggy Azalea from the 2014 album The New Classic
- Walk the Line, a 2015 sculpture by Joe Sheehan (artist)
- Walk the Line (TV series), a 2021 UK television series on ITV

== See also ==
- I Walk the Line (disambiguation)
- We Walk the Line: A Celebration of the Music of Johnny Cash , a 2012 tribute album to Johnny Cash
