= Reflections: The Definitive Performances (1964–1969) =

Video by The Supremes
- Released: December 5, 2006
- Recorded: 1964–1969
- Genre: R&B, soul
- Length: 150 mins
- Label: Motown
- Producer: Joe Lauro & Barry Feldman (Historical Films Archive); Olivier Robert Murphy, Ian Brenchley & Archie Gormley (Universal Music Group International); Harry Weinger (Universal Music Enterprises)

The Supremes chronology
Reflections: The Definitive Performances (1964–1969) (2006)	Greatest Hits: Live in Amsterdam (2006)

Reflections: The Definitive Performances 1964–1969 is an anthology of performances by the Supremes. It was produced by Historic Films Archive and the Universal Music Group International. This compilation was certified Platinum by the RIAA on July 28, 2011, denoting over 100,000 DVDs sold/shipped.

== Track listing ==
=== Main tracks ===
1. "Where Did Our Love Go" (from The Steve Allen Show - September 24, 1964)
2. "Baby Love" (from Shivaree - 1965)
3. "Come See About Me" (from Teen Town - 1965)
4. "Stop! In the Name of Love" (from Murray The K – It's What's Happening, Baby - June 28, 1965)
5. "Back in My Arms Again" (from The Mike Douglas Show - November 3, 1965)
6. "Nothing but Heartaches" (from Hullabaloo - September 13, 1965)
7. "I Hear a Symphony" (from The Mike Douglas Show - November 3, 1965)
8. "My World Is Empty Without You" (from Anatomy of Pop - February 15, 1966)
9. "You Can't Hurry Love" (from The Ed Sullivan Show - September 25, 1966)
10. "You Keep Me Hangin' On" (promotional film)
11. "Love Is Here and Now You're Gone" (from The Andy Williams Show - January 22, 1967)
12. "The Happening" (live in Stockholm - April 20, 1968)
13. "Reflections" (from the Tennessee Ernie Ford Special - December 3, 1967)
14. "In and Out of Love" (live in Stockholm - April 20, 1968)
15. "Love Child" (from The Ed Sullivan Show - September 29, 1968)
16. "Someday We'll Be Together" (from The Hollywood Palace - October 18, 1969)

=== Bonus Tracks ===
1. "Baby Love" (from Top of the Pops - October 15, 1964)
2. "Stop! In the Name of Love" (from Shivaree - 1965)
3. "When the Lovelight Starts Shining Through His Eyes" (live in Carrè - October 14, 1964)
4. "My World Is Empty Without You" (from Anatomy of Pop (original version) - February 15, 1966)

=== DVD Extras ===
The Supremes in the Motown studios: Acappella lead & background vocals for "Baby Love," "Stop! In the Name of Love," "My World Is Empty Without You," "You Keep Me Hangin' On," "Love Child" & "Someday We'll Be Together." Restored stereo audio from the Motown master tapes for all studio recordings. Supremes trivia track: One click of the subtitle button brings you more of the story! 20-page booklet with classic photos and essays by noted author Brian Chin and the DVD producers.

== Personnel ==
- Diana Ross
- Mary Wilson
- Florence Ballard
- Cindy Birdsong
