= Let the Sunshine In (album) =

Let The Sunshine In

Studio album by Diana Ross & the Supremes
- Released: May 26, 1969
- Recorded: 1966–1969
- Genre: Pop-soul
- Length: 34:00
- Labels: Motown; MS 689
- Producers: Berry Gordy, Frank Wilson, R. Dean Taylor, Deke Richards, Henry Cosby, Smokey Robinson, Nickolas Ashford & Valerie Simpson, Pete Moore, George Gordy, Harvey Fuqua, Johnny Bristol, William Weatherspoon, Brian Holland and Lamont Dozier

Diana Ross & the Supremes chronology
TCB (1968)	Let The Sunshine In (1969)	Together (1969)

Singles from Let the Sunshine In
- 1. "I'm Livin' in Shame" Released: January 6, 1969; 2. "The Composer" Released: March 27, 1969; 3. "No Matter What Sign You Are" Released: May 9, 1969

Professional ratings
Review scores
Source	Rating
AllMusic	3.5/5 stars

Let The Sunshine In is the sixteenth studio album by Diana Ross & the Supremes recorded and released by Motown in 1969. It contains the hit single "I'm Livin' in Shame" (the sequel to 1968's number-one hit "Love Child"), "The Composer," a Smokey Robinson composition that peaked at number 27, and "No Matter What Sign You Are," - a single produced by Motown chief Berry Gordy that failed to crack to Top 30 (peaking at number 31). Motown had titled the album “No Matter What Sign You Are” originally; going as far as creating the front cover art with the title in it, but when the single didn’t chart as expected the album was retitled “Let The Sunshine In.” Though the album was released when the group consisted of Diana Ross, Mary Wilson and Cindy Birdsong, original founding member Florence Ballard (whom Birdsong replaced) appears on two songs.

One track from this album, "Let the Music Play" was an outtake from the I Hear a Symphony (1966) album recording sessions and therefore features backing by Ballard, who was fired in 1967, two years prior to the release of this album. The other track, "What Becomes of the Broken Hearted", was recorded by the Supremes in 1966.

== Track listing ==
=== Side one ===
1. "The Composer" (Smokey Robinson) – 2:55
2. "Everyday People" (Sly Stone) – 2:59
3. "No Matter What Sign You Are" (Berry Gordy, Hank Cosby) – 2:56
4. "Hey, Western Union Man" (Kenny Gamble, Leon Huff) – 2:53
5. "What Becomes of the Broken Hearted" (Paul Riser, James Dean, William Weatherspoon) – 2:52
6. "I'm Livin' in Shame" (The Clan) – 2:57

=== Side two ===
1. Medley: "Aquarius/Let the Sunshine In (The Flesh Failures)" (James Rado, Gerome Ragni, Galt MacDermot) – 2:59
2. "Let the Music Play" (Burt Bacharach, Hal David) – 2:39
3. "With a Child's Heart" (Hank Cosby, Sylvia Moy, Vicki Basemore) – 2:59
4. "Discover Me (And You'll Discover Love)" (Johnny Bristol, Beatrice Verdi, Doris McNeil) – 2:24
5. "Will This Be the Day" (Pete Moore, Terry Johnson, Beatrice Verdi) – 2:56
6. "I'm So Glad I Got Somebody (Like You Around)"(Allen Story, Horgay Gordy, L. Russell Brown) – 3:31

=== Unused Recordings from the Let The Sunshine In timeframe (November 1968-May 1969) ===
1. "MacArthur Park" (Webb)
2. "You're Gonna Hear from Me" (Previn-Previn)
3. "Son of a Preacher Man" (Hurley-Wilkins)
4. "For Once in My Life" (Miller-Murden)
5. "Witchi Tai To" (Pepper)
6. "Canadian Sunset" (Heywood-Gimbel)
7. "Autumn Leaves" (Mercer-Prevert-Kosma)
8. "Are You Sure Love Is The Name Of This Game" (Robinson)
9. "Stormy" (Buie-Cobb)
10. "A Little Breeze" (Sharpe)

== Personnel ==
- Diana Ross – lead and background vocals
- Mary Wilson – background vocals (except "No Matter What Sign You Are").
- Cindy Birdsong – background vocals (except "Let the Music Play", “What Becomes of the Broken Hearted”, and "No Matter What Sign You Are").
- Florence Ballard – background vocals on "Let the Music Play”.
- The Andantes – background vocals
- The Blackberries – background vocals on "No Matter What Sign You Are"
- The Funk Brothers – instrumentation
- Various Los Angeles-area session musicians – instrumentation

== Charts ==
=== Weekly charts ===
Chart (1969)	Peak position
Canada Top Albums/CDs (RPM)	27
UK R&B Albums (Record Mirror)	1
US Billboard 200	24
US Top R&B/Hip-Hop Albums (Billboard)	7
