= The Young Folks =

Song by Diana Ross & the Supremes

from the album Cream of the Crop
- Released: May 9, 1969
- Genre: Soul
- Length: 3:13
- Label: Motown; M 1148
- Songwriters: Allen Story, George Gordy
- Producer: George Gordy

Diana Ross & the Supremes singles chronology
"The Composer" (1969)	"The Young Folks" (1969)	"The Weight" (1969)

"The Young Folks" is a song by Diana Ross and the Supremes, released as the B-side to "No Matter What Sign You Are" in 1969. Written by Allen Story and George Gordy, "The Young Folks" was included on the album Cream of the Crop (1969). In addition to appearing on the Canadian RPM Top Singles and US Billboard and Cashbox charts, "The Young Folks" reached number five on Jet's Soul Brothers Top 20. The song was covered by the Jackson 5, on the album ABC (1970).

== Charts ==
Chart (1969)	Peak position
Canada Top Singles (RPM)	91
US Billboard Hot 100	69
US Cashbox Top 100	89
