= The Supremes' farewell concert =

On 12 June 1977, The Supremes performed their final concert together at Theatre Royal, Drury Lane in London, England.

== Mary Wilson's departure ==
In early 1977, sole remaining original group member Mary Wilson announced that she would be leaving The Supremes to embark upon a solo career. During one of the group's last television appearances together, on the US daytime talk show, The Mike Douglas Show, Wilson announced that she would be stepping out from the group to pursue a solo career.

As the group's touring schedule was booked months in advance, it fell that the group would be performing at one of London's top theaters in Drury Lane, on Wilson's last night as a member. The event was well publicized throughout the United Kingdom and was broadcast by London's Capital Radio. The show was opened by up-and-coming singer Billy Ocean.

== Songs performed ==
- "Everybody Gets To Go To The Moon"/"Corner Of The Sky"
- "Let Yourself Go"
- "Stoned Love"
- "The Way We Were"
- "Maybe This Time"
- "Someday We'll Be Together"
- "You Keep Me Hanging On"
- "Where Did Our Love Go"
- "Baby Love"
- "Love Child"
- "Stop! In the Name of Love"
- "My World Is Empty Without You"
- "Knocks Me Off My Feet" - solo performance by Susaye Greene
- "What About Today?" - solo performance by Scherrie Payne
- "A Song for You" /"How Lucky Can You Get" - solo performance by Mary Wilson
- "I'm Gonna Let My Heart Do the Walking"

In her second autobiography Supreme Faith: Someday We'll Be Together, Mary Wilson recalls other songs being performed as latter day singles by the group such as "You're My Driving Wheel", "He's My Man" and "You're What's Missing in My Life". However, Wilson also states that the concert closed with "Someday We'll Be Together". Susaye Greene has stated in several on-line interviews that she does not recall the concert specifically (it was just another engagement at that time, as Scherrie and Susaye planned to continue The Supremes with a new member. The Ladies later chose Joyce Vincent-Wilson, formerly of Tony Orlando & Dawn, as their third member.) Greene also stated that Scherrie Payne took lead vocals on "Tossing and Turning", and that she herself performed "He Ain't Heavy, He's My Brother", which had been a highlight of the group's live act for the past twelve months.

== Personnel ==
- Mary Wilson
- Scherrie Payne
- Susaye Greene

== See also ==
- Farewell (The Supremes album)
