= Diana Ross & the Supremes: The No. 1's =

The No. 1s

Compilation album by Diana Ross & the Supremes
- Released: October 21, 2003
- Recorded: 1964–1981
- Genre: Pop
- Length: 79:50
- Label: Motown

Diana Ross & the Supremes chronology
The 70s Anthology (2002)	The No. 1s (2003)	Joined Together: The Complete Studio Duets (2004)

Professional ratings
Review scores
Source	Rating
AllMusic	5/5 stars
Encyclopedia of Popular Music	5/5 stars

Diana Ross & the Supremes: The No. 1s is a 2003 compact disc collection of the number-one singles achieved by The Supremes led by Diana Ross and Jean Terrell ("Stoned Love") in addition to solo Diana Ross singles on the American and United Kingdom pop charts. The album features 23 tracks and a bonus remix.

The songs have all been digitally remastered and also remixed from the original master tapes. The quality of the sound is much clearer than any collection before, however, the mixes can sound drastically different from the original versions, especially the songs recorded between 1964 and 1969. Having used the original elements from the original masters, the mixers were able to attain new recordings, with much clearer sounds, heavier bass and noticeably higher volume levels of the background vocals. Another peculiarity about several songs on this album is that they are longer than the original versions. The vocals and instrumentations are let go on until the musicians stopped playing and the girls finished singing, without fade-outs. These had never been heard before being issued on this album.

The UK version of the album uses different masters of lesser quality, and the remixing and mastering that is exclusive to this album are missing. Also, "I Hear a Symphony" and "The Boss" have been removed and substituted by "I'm Still Waiting" and "Chain Reaction," which were both solo #1 hits for Diana Ross in the UK.

== Track listing ==
International

1. "Where Did Our Love Go"^{1} (Holland–Dozier–Holland) – 2:40
2. "Baby Love"^{1} (Holland–Dozier–Holland) – 2:49
3. "Come See About Me"^{1} (Holland–Dozier–Holland) – 2:45
4. "Stop! In the Name of Love"^{1} (Holland–Dozier–Holland) – 3:00
5. "Back in My Arms Again"^{1} (Holland–Dozier–Holland) – 3:01
6. "I Hear a Symphony"^{1} (Holland–Dozier–Holland) – 2:44
7. "You Can't Hurry Love"^{1} (Holland–Dozier–Holland) – 3:00
8. "You Keep Me Hangin' On"^{1} (Holland–Dozier–Holland) – 3:14
9. "Love Is Here and Now You're Gone"^{1} (Holland–Dozier–Holland) – 2:50
10. "The Happening"^{1} (Holland–Dozier–Holland, Frank De Vol) – 3:02
11. "Reflections"^{2} (Holland–Dozier–Holland) – 3:18
12. "Love Child"^{2} (The Clan) – 3:14
13. "I'm Gonna Make You Love Me"^{2} (featuring The Temptations) (Gamble and Huff, Jerry Ross) – 3:11
14. "Someday We'll Be Together"^{2} (Jackey Beavers, Johnny Bristol, Harvey Fuqua) – 3:32
15. "Stoned Love"^{3} (Yennik Samoht, Frank Wilson) – 3:19
16. "Ain't No Mountain High Enough"^{4} (Nickolas Ashford, Valerie Simpson) – 3:36
17. "Touch Me in the Morning"^{4} (Michael Masser, Ron Miller) – 3:25
18. "Theme from Mahogany (Do You Know Where You're Going To)"^{4} (Gerry Goffin, Masser) – 3:22
19. "Love Hangover"^{4} (Marilyn McLeod, Sawyer) – 3:44
20. "The Boss"^{4} (Ashford, Simpson) – 3:54
21. "Upside Down"^{4} (Bernard Edwards, Nile Rodgers) – 3:38
22. "I'm Coming Out"^{4} (Edwards, Rodgers) – 3:56
23. "Endless Love"^{4} (Lionel Richie) – 4:27
24. "You Keep Me Hangin' On" Almighty Mix Edit (Holland–Dozier–Holland) – 3:57

UK

1. Where Did Our Love Go^{1}
2. Baby Love^{1}
3. Come See About Me^{1}
4. Stop! In the Name Of Love^{1}
5. Back in My Arms Again^{1}
6. You Can't Hurry Love^{1}
7. You Keep Me Hangin' On^{1}
8. Love Is Here and Now You're Gone^{1}
9. The Happening^{1}
10. Reflections^{2}
11. Love Child^{2}
12. I'm Gonna Make You Love Me^{2} [feat. The Temptations]
13. Someday We'll Be Together^{2}
14. Stoned Love^{3}
15. Ain't No Mountain High Enough^{4}
16. I'm Still Waiting^{4}
17. Touch Me in the Morning^{4}
18. Theme From "Mahogany" (Do You Know Where You're Going To)^{4}
19. Love Hangover^{4}
20. Upside Down^{4}
21. I'm Coming Out^{4}
22. Endless Love^{4} [Diana Ross & Lionel Richie]
23. Chain Reaction^{5}
24. You Keep Me Hangin' On [Almighty Mix Edit]

^{1} Indicates The Supremes from 1964 to 1967
^{2} Indicates Diana Ross & the Supremes billing from 1967 to 1969
^{3} Indicates Jean Terrell-led Supremes in 1970
^{4} Indicates Diana Ross' solo career from 1970 to 1981
^{5} Indicates Diana Ross in 1986.

== Charts ==
Chart (2004)	Peak position
Scottish Albums (OCC)	38
UK Albums (OCC)	26
US Billboard 200	72
US Top R&B/Hip-Hop Albums (Billboard)	63
Chart (2007)	Peak position
Scottish Albums (OCC)	25
UK Albums (OCC)	15
US Top Catalog Albums (Billboard)	48
Chart (2015)	Peak position
Japanese Albums (Oricon)	279

== Certifications ==
Region	Certification	Certified units/sales
New Zealand (RMNZ)	Platinum	15,000^{‡}
United Kingdom (BPI)	Platinum	300,000^{‡}
^{‡} Sales+streaming figures based on certification alone.
