= Jackey Beavers =

American singer-songwriter

- Born: Robert Lewis Beavers; June 19, 1937; Cartersville, Georgia, United States
- Died: October 28, 2008 (aged 71)
- Genres: Rhythm and blues, soul, gospel
- Occupations: Singer, songwriter, record producer
- Years active: 1960–1988
- Labels: Anna, Tri-Phi, Nation, Dade, Revilot, Grandland, Jaber, Glory

Robert Lewis "Jackey" Beavers (June 19, 1937 – October 28, 2008) was an American rhythm and blues and gospel singer, songwriter, pastor and community activist. He recorded with Johnny Bristol as the duo Johnny and Jackey, and co-wrote "Someday We'll Be Together", later a no.1 hit for Diana Ross and the Supremes.

== Biography ==
Beavers was born and grew up in Cartersville, Georgia, and, after leaving high school, joined the US Air Force. While stationed at Fort Custer he won a talent competition, and became friends with one of the other competitors, Johnny Bristol. They began performing together as Johnny and Jackey, and won a residency at the El Grotto Lounge at Battle Creek, Michigan, where the house band was led by Junior Walker. They soon signed for Anna Records, where they were managed by Berry Gordy's sister Gwen. The duo released two singles on the Anna label in 1960, before moving to the Tri-Phi label which Gwen Gordy set up with her husband Harvey Fuqua.

The duo's second single for Tri-Phi, "Someday We'll Be Together" in 1962, was co-written by Beavers with Johnny Bristol and Harvey Fuqua, but was not a hit at the time. Finding little commercial success, Johnny and Jackey split up, and Beavers began recording with Roquel Davis at the Checker label. The first release, "Jack-A-Rue" in 1965, was a modest local hit, but its follow-up was unsuccessful. Beavers then recorded for several other labels in the late 1960s, including Nation, Dade, Revilot, Grandland and Jaber. Although the records were not hits at the time, several, such as "Love That Never Grows Old" on Revilot in 1967, are regarded highly by Northern soul fans. Beavers also recorded as a member of The Soul Continentals, and performed with The Continental Showstoppers. He wrote songs for Joe Simon, Ella Washington, and others.

In the early 1970s he worked as a producer as well as a recording artist at Sound Stage 7 Records, operated by John Richbourg in Nashville, before he returned to Cartersville. After a period managing a nightclub, Beavers returned to college, earned a degree, and was ordained as a Minister, first at the New Hope Baptist Church and later at the Glory Harvester Church. He recorded several gospel albums on the Glory record label, including The Inspired (1977), Refreshing (1986), and We Are God's Children (1988).

He also worked for Joe Frank Harris, the Governor of Georgia, between 1983 and 1990, as Executive Assistant for minority affairs and small business. In particular, he liaised between the Governor and the African-American community, through work with commissions, organizations and task forces related to civil rights, and small businesses. He was Executive Assistant to the Commissioner of the Georgia Department of Corrections for three years; and an aide to Tom Murphy, Speaker of the Georgia House of Representatives, for seven years. He also wrote a column for the Cartersville Daily Tribune News, and led his church's activities in promoting prison reform.

He died at the age of 71 in 2008, not in 1988 as reported on some sites. In 2011 he was posthumously inducted into the Bartow County Gospel Music Hall of Fame.
