= Bad Weather =

1973 single by The Supremes

Single by The Supremes
- Released: March 22, 1973
- Recorded: 1973
- Genre: Soul, Funk, R&B
- Length: 3:01 (album/single version)
- Label: Motown; M 1225
- Songwriters: Stevie Wonder; Ira Tucker Jr.
- Producer: Stevie Wonder

The Supremes singles chronology
"I Guess I'll Miss the Man" (1972)	"Bad Weather" (1973)	"He's My Man" (1975)

"Bad Weather" is a song recorded and released as a single by Motown vocal group The Supremes in 1973. It was composed by Stevie Wonder and Lynda Laurence's brother Ira Tucker Jr., and produced by Wonder. The song was Jean Terrell's last charted single as lead singer of the Supremes and the second and last time Laurence was featured on a Supremes single.

== Recording ==
By 1973, the Supremes' records were doing poorly in the charts. Cindy Birdsong left the group on maternity leave after recording the group's 1972 album, Floy Joy and was temporarily replaced by former Wonderlove background singer, Lynda Laurence. Although Birdsong was featured on every track, Laurence appeared on the cover of the album. The new lineup featuring Laurence set about recording The Supremes Produced and Arranged by Jimmy Webb, but it also sold poorly in spite of good reviews. Undaunted, Laurence asked Wonder, her former mentor, to help the group find a new sound. Wonder concocted the single "Bad Weather" using a funkier sound that the group had been accustomed to, and is reported to have recorded a few more songs with the trio (such as "Soft Days", whose demo recording circulates in bootleg copies) for a future unreleased album project.

== Critical reception ==
When the proto-disco song (including the characteristic whistle sound of the discothèque experience) was first issued to radio in the summer of 1973, it caught some initial positive buzz mainly from the Supremes' American R&B fan base. In a contemporary review for UK publication Record Mirror, James Hamilton expressed 'Stevie Wonder penned and produced the "A" side here especially for Jean Terrell: it's in his own current mould, which means full of weaving melodies and poly-rhythms — and like Stevie's own LPs, it slips by all too easily. Lovely listening, but will it stop Pop Pickers in their tracks?' Of the b-side, "It's So Hard For Me to Say Goodbye", Hamilton wrote, 'The Frank Wilson-produced tensile slow flip is a strung-out beauty'.

"Bad Weather" was performed to a receptive audience on Soul Train, but the buzz wore down as, according to Mary Wilson years later, it wasn't a favorite of Terrell's or Laurence's. Motown also failed to promote and push the song despite pleas from the group and Wonder. Unknowingly the group was ahead of its time, announcing the disco era. Shortly after this single was released, Terrell left the Supremes, later followed by Laurence when she became pregnant. As years went by the Stevie Wonder song became a cult favorite, it was covered in 1978 by Melissa Manchester in her LP Don't Cry Out Loud, and by Dutch singer Mathilde Santing in her 1994 album Under a Blue Roof, and Rolling Stone selected it at number 75 on their list of the 100 Greatest Motown Songs in 2021.

== Commercial performance ==
The song peaked at number 87 on the US Billboard Hot 100 and 74 on the R&B singles chart. However it was a different story outside the United States: "Bad Weather" was extensively played on Radio Europa, it peaked at the Top 40 of the UK singles chart at number 37, while in places like Puerto Rico it became a huge hit in discothèques and went up to number 1 in radio charts.

The next Supremes project would take two more years to come out. In 1975, a fresh lineup of the group (including Birdsong and the newly recruited vocalist Scherrie Payne) released the disco single He's My Man with Wilson and Payne on lead, but this time the song went to the top of the dance chart.

== Personnel ==
- Lead vocals by Jean Terrell
- Background vocals by Jean Terrell and Mary Wilson and Lynda Laurence (also ad-lib solo on outro)
- Produced and arranged by Stevie Wonder
- Written by Stevie Wonder and Ira Tucker Jr.

== Charts ==
Chart (1973)	Peak position
UK Singles (OCC)	37
US Billboard Hot 100	87
US Hot R&B/Hip-Hop Songs (Billboard)	74
US Cashbox Top 100	92
US Record World Singles	115
