= ABC (The Jackson 5 album) =

1970 studio album by the Jackson 5

Studio album by the Jackson 5
- Released: May 8, 1970
- Studio: The Sound Factory (West Hollywood, California)
- Genres: Bubblegum; rock; R&B
- Length: 35:45
- Label: Motown
- Producers: The Corporation; Hal Davis; Bobby Taylor

The Jackson 5 chronology
Diana Ross Presents The Jackson 5 (1969)	ABC (1970)	Third Album (1970)

Singles from ABC
- 1. "ABC" Released: February 24, 1970; 2. "The Love You Save" Released: May 13, 1970

ABC is the second studio album by American pop band the Jackson 5, released on May 8, 1970 by Motown. It featured the No. 1 singles "ABC" and "The Love You Save", and has sold up to 6 million copies worldwide. Also present on the LP were several notable album tracks, including a cover of Funkadelic's "I'll Bet You", "I Found That Girl" (the only track with brother Jermaine on lead vocals), and "The Young Folks", originally recorded by Diana Ross and the Supremes.

The album peaked at No. 4 on the Billboard Pop Albums Chart and at No. 1 on the Billboard Black Albums chart in the United States. It was ranked No. 98 on VH1's All-Time Albums Top 100 list. It remains one of the Jackson 5's most popular efforts. The title track was nominated for the Grammy Award for Best Pop Performance by a Duo or Group with Vocals in 1971.

== Re-release ==
In 2001, Motown remastered all Jackson 5 albums in a "Two Classic Albums/One CD" series (much like they did in the late 1980s). This album was paired up with Diana Ross Presents The Jackson 5. The bonus track was an outtake, "Oh, I've Been Blessed", a song also released on the rare 1979 outtakes album Boogie.

An alternate version of the title track appears on the CD I Want You Back! Unreleased Masters released in 2009.

== Critical reception ==
Professional ratings
Review scores
Source	Rating
AllMusic	4.5/5 stars
Christgau's Record Guide	B+
Rolling Stone	favorable

ABC received widespread critical acclaim. AllMusic stated, "Not even six months after the Jackson 5 -- Jackie, Jermaine, Marlon, Michael, and Tito -- issued their debut long-player, Diana Ross Presents the Jackson 5 (1969), the vocal quintet returned with ABC (1970), arguably the brothers' most solid effort of the early '70s. The Jacksons' collective (and respective) talents, coupled with exemplary material and the finest behind the scenes crew Motown had to offer, were directly responsible for the enormous success that placed the LP at the crest of the R&B chart and into the Top Five of the pop survey, while the title track and the double-sided hit single "The Love You Save" b/w "I Found That Girl" all went directly to the number one position across the board".

== Track listing ==
Side one
No.	Title	Writer(s)	Length
1.	"The Love You Save"	The Corporation	3:01
2.	"One More Chance"	The Corporation	2:56
3.	"ABC"	The Corporation	2:56
4.	"2-4-6-8"	Leon Ware, Pam Sawyer	2:55
5.	"(Come 'Round Here) I'm the One You Need"	Brian Holland, Lamont Dozier, Edward Holland	2:46
6.	"Don't Know Why I Love You"	Lula Mae Hardaway, Don Hunter, Paul Riser, Stevie Wonder	3:47

Side two
No.	Title	Writer(s)	Length
7.	"Never Had a Dream Come True"	Stevie Wonder, Sylvia Moy, Henry Cosby	2:58
8.	"True Love Can Be Beautiful"	Leonard Caston, Jr., Jeana Jackson, Bobby Taylor	3:24
9.	"La-La (Means I Love You)"	Thom Bell and William Hart	3:29
10.	"I'll Bet You"	George Clinton, Sidney Barnes, Theresa Lindsey	3:20
11.	"I Found That Girl"	The Corporation	3:08
12.	"The Young Folks"	George Gordy, Allen Story	2:50

== Personnel ==
Musicians on the song's session were uncredited, in line with Motown policy. Motown did not list session musician credits on their releases until 1971. The musicians who performed on "ABC" are believed to be as follows:

- Wilton Felder, Ron Brown and Bob West - Bass
- Gene Pello, Ed Greene and James Gadson - Drums
- David T. Walker, Louis Shelton, Don Peake and Willie Hutch - Guitar
- Don Randi and Joe Sample - Piano
- Freddie Perren - Keyboards
- Jerry Steinholtz, Bobbye Hall and Sandra Crouch - Percussion

== Charts ==
=== Weekly charts ===
Chart (1970)	Peak position
Australian Albums (Kent Music Report)	14
Canadian Albums (RPM)	25
Japanese Albums (Oricon)	85
UK Albums (OCC)	22
US Billboard 200	4
US Best Selling Soul LP's	1

=== Year-end charts ===
Chart (1970)	Position
US Billboard Pop Albums	53
US Billboard Top Soul Albums	9

== Sales ==
Region	Certification	Certified units/sales
United States	—	2,000,000
Summaries
Worldwide	—	6,000,000
^{*} Sales figures based on certification alone.^{^} Shipments figures based on certification alone.

== Singles ==
Title	Year	Peak chart positions			
Title	Year	US	US R&B	UK	AUS
"ABC"	1970	1	1	8	14
"The Love You Save"	1970	1	1	7	59

== See also ==
- List of number-one R&B albums of 1970 (U.S.)
