= I Guess I'll Miss the Man =

Single by The Supremes

from the album The Supremes Produced and Arranged by Jimmy Webb
- B-side: "Over and Over"
- Released: 1972
- Recorded: 1972, Mowest, Hollywood, California
- Genre: Pop
- Length: 2:38 (single/album version)
- Label: Motown
- Songwriter: Stephen Schwartz
- Producers: Sherlie Matthews; Deke Richards

The Supremes singles chronology
| "Your Wonderful, Sweet Sweet Love" (1972) | "I Guess I'll Miss the Man" (1972) | "Bad Weather" (1973) |

"I Guess I'll Miss the Man" is a song written by Stephen Schwartz and released as a single by Motown singing group The Supremes in 1972 from their album The Supremes Produced and Arranged by Jimmy Webb. Contrary to the album's title, the song was produced by Sherlie Matthews and Deke Richards. It peaked at 17 on Billboard's Adult Contemporary chart and 85 on the Hot 100.

The song has appeared in the musical Pippin since its original Broadway introduction in 1972 (as it was partially financed by Motown at the time), and is sung by the show's character Catherine.

Marti Webb recorded a version of the song for her 1981 album Won't Change Places, as did Connie Fisher for her 2009 album Secret Love.

== Charts ==
| Chart (1972) | Peak position |
|---|---|
| US Billboard Hot 100 | 85 |
| US Adult Contemporary (Billboard) | 17 |
| US Cashbox Top 100 | 100 |
| US Record World Singles | 95 |

== Personnel ==
- Lead vocals by Jean Terrell
- Background vocals by Mary Wilson and Lynda Laurence
