= Diana Extended: The Remixes =

Remix album by Diana Ross
- Released: April 12, 1994
- Recorded: 1969–1991
- Genre: Dance/House
- Length: 50:34
- Label: Motown

Diana Ross chronology
One Woman: The Ultimate Collection (1993)	Diana Extended: The Remixes (1994)	A Very Special Season (1994)

Singles from Diana Extended: The Remixes
- 1. "Someday We'll Be Together" Released: April 9, 1994

Professional ratings
Review scores
Source	Rating
AllMusic	2.5/5 stars
Music Week	4/5 stars

Diana Extended: The Remixes is a remix album released by American soul singer Diana Ross in 1994. The album includes six tracks that were reworked by some of the biggest names in the industry at the time, covering Ross' career as a solo artist and as a member of The Supremes, with Frankie Knuckles updating "Someday We'll Be Together" from 1969. The album also contains a remix of "Chain Reaction", originally released during Ross' time at RCA. The seventh track is "You're Gonna Love It", a track from the album The Force Behind the Power. The version on Diana Extended: The Remixes is a short remix available previously on a 12" single.

The album was only moderately successful on both sides of the Atlantic, reaching #58 on the UK Albums Chart and #68 on the US Top R&B/Hip-Hop Albums, while missing the Billboard Top 200 entirely. "Someday We'll Be Together" was released as a single and peaked at #7 on the Hot Dance Music/Club Play charts (April 1994). The album ultimately sold around 80,000 copies in the US.

The US version of the album was released on Motown, and European/Japanese versions on EMI. Track listings were the same, but special editions were also issued. Many remixes, including those by Joey Negro, weren't included on the album but instead only on the many singles released for the club market.

== Track listings and formats ==
- US, UK CD/ 12"Vinyl Maxi-single
1. "The Boss" (David Morales Remix) – 6:31
2. "Love Hangover" (Frankie Knuckles Remix) – 8:24
3. "Upside Down" (David Morales & Satoshi Tomiie) – 8:06
4. "Someday We'll Be Together" (Frankie Knuckles Remix) – 8:46
5. "Chain Reaction" (Dewey B & Spike) – 6:15
6. "You're Gonna Love It" (E-Smoove & Steve 'Silk' Hurley Remix) – 4:24
7. "I'm Coming Out" (Maurice's Club Remix) – 8:08
- US, UK 12"Vinyl Limited Ed. Double LP
  - A1. "The Boss" (David Morales Remix) – 6:27
  - A2. "Someday We'll Be Together" (Frankie Knuckles Def Mix) – 8:43
  - A3. "I'm Coming Out" (Maurice Club Mix) – 8:07
  - B1. "Upside Down" (David Morales Down Under Mix) – 8:04
  - B2. "Love Hangover" (Frankie Knuckles Classic Mix) – 8:20
  - B3. "Love Hangover" (Frank Knuckles Tribal Reprise Remix) – 5:23
  - C1. "Someday We'll Be Together" (Frankie Knuckles Dub Remix) – 6:57
  - C2. "The Boss (David Morales Dub Remix) – 6:55
  - C3. "Upside Down" (Satoshi Tomiie & David Morales Dub Part 1) – 7:42
  - D1. "The Boss" (David Morales BYC Remix) – 11:06
  - D2. "I'm Coming Out" (Maurice's Monstrumental Remix) – 8:02

== Singles ==
=== Your Love ===
- UK CD 1 Maxi-single
1. "Your Love" – 4:04
2. Missing You" – 4:03
3. "Love Hangover" (Frankie Knuckles Tribal Hangover Remix) – 9:30
4. "When You Tell Me That You Love Me" – 4:10
- UK CD 2 Maxi-single
1. "Your Love" – 04:05
2. "Upside Down" (Satoshi Tomiie & David Morales Remix) – 08:06
3. "Someday We'll Be Together" (Frankie Knuckles Remix) – 08:45
4. "Chain Reaction" – 03:46
- US, UK 12"Vinyl promo
  - A1."Love Hangover (Tribal Hangover)" – 9:26
  - A2."Love Hangover (Classic Club)" – 8:20
  - B1."Love Hangover (Tribal Reprise)" – 5:25
  - B2."Your Love" – 3:58
- US, UK 12"Vinyl single
  - A1."Upside Down ('93 Remix) " – 8:00
  - A2."Upside Down (Dub 2) " – 7:37
  - B1."Someday We'll Be Together ('93 Remix)" – 8:40
  - B2."Someday We'll Be Together (Final Sound Factory)" – 6:54

=== Why Do Fools Fall in Love ===
- UK 12"Vinyl single
  - A1."I'm Coming Out" (K.O.K. club mix)
  - A2."I'm Coming Out" (Daybreak mix)
  - B1."The Boss" (Morales club mix)
  - B2."Why Do Fools Fall in Love"

=== I'm Coming Out ===
- UK 12" Vinyl promo-only (Remixes)
  - A1."I'm Coming Out" (K.O.K. Club Mix) – 9:10
  - A2."I'm Coming Out" (Daybreak Mix) – 5:40
  - B1."The Boss"(Morales Club Mix) – 11:07
  - B2."The Boss" (Dub) – 6:55
- France CD Maxi-single (Remixes)
1. "I'm Coming Out" (7" Mix) – 4:03
2. "I'm Coming Out" (K.O.K Club Mix) – 9:10
3. "I'm Coming Out" (Extended 12" Mix) – 6:00
4. "I'm Coming Out" (Daybreak Mix) – 6:00

Remixes produced by Joey Negro

=== Someday We'll Be Together ===
- US 12" Maxi-single
  - A1."Someday We'll Be Together" (Radio Edit) – 3:04
  - A2."Someday We'll Be Together" (Def Mix) – 8:42
  - B1."Someday We'll Be Together" (Soundfactory Mix) – 6:57

Remix and additional production by Frankie Knuckles for Def Mix Productions

=== The Best Years of My Life ===
- UK CD Maxi-single / UK 12" Vinyl promo-only
1. "The Best Years of My Life"
2. "Upside Down" ('93 Remix)
3. "Upside Down" (Morales Dub)
4. "You Can't Hurry Love"

=== The Boss/I'm Coming Out ===
- US CD Maxi-promo
1. "The Boss" (Radio edit) – 4:00
2. "I'm Coming Out" (Radio edit) – 3:45
3. "The Boss" (EP version) – 6:27
4. "I'm Coming Out" (EP version) – 8:07
5. "I'm Coming Out" (Bonus beats) 2:00

"The Boss" (Remix and additional production by David Morales for Def Mix Productions)
"I'm Coming Out" (Remix and additional production by Maurice Joshua 4 Vibe Productions)

== Charts ==
Chart performance for Diana Extended: The Remixes
Chart (1994)	Peak position
UK Albums (OCC)	58
US Top R&B/Hip-Hop Albums (Billboard)	68
