= The '70s Anthology =

Compilation album by The Supremes
- Released: October 29, 2002
- Recorded: Summer 1969–summer 1976
- Genre: Soul/Pop
- Length: 2:33:39
- Label: Motown
- Producer: Harry Weinger

The Supremes chronology
| Diana Ross & the Supremes Anthology (version 4) (2001) | The '70s Anthology (2002) | Diana Ross & The Supremes: The No. 1's (2003) |

Professional ratings
Review scores
| Source | Rating |
|---|---|
| Allmusic | 4.5/5 stars |
| PopMatters | (Favorable) |
| The Times | 5/5 stars |

The '70s Anthology is a 2002 two compact disc set of many of the songs recorded by the 1970s groupings of The Supremes. The set features 42 tracks, of which 10 had never been released, and 6 were appearing in extended or unedited forms.

The set features a 24-page booklet with liner notes written by Mary Wilson, who was the only member in every version of The Supremes through 1977.

Probably the most notable of the new material are the songs "Oh My Poor Baby", "Make It With You", "I'll Let Him Know That I Love Him", "Never Can Say Goodbye", "Walk With Me, Talk With Me Darling", which are all from the shelved Promises Kept album (recorded in mid-1971, to be released after the album Touch). Instead the Floy Joy sessions, supervised by Smokey Robinson were recorded and released in 1972.

== Guide to lineups ==
The 1970s Supremes featured several different lineups.

- Lineup 1 (1970 to April 1972) - Jean Terrell, Mary Wilson and Cindy Birdsong (From Disc 1 - tracks 1 to 20)
- Lineup 2 (April 1972 to October 1973) - Jean Terrell, Mary Wilson and Lynda Laurence (From Disc 1 - track 21 to 22 & Disc 2 - tracks 1 to 4)
- Lineup 3 (October 1973 to the end of January 1976) - Scherrie Payne, Mary Wilson and Cindy Birdsong. (From Disc 2 - tracks 5 to 11)
- Lineup 4 (Feb. 1976 to June 1977) - Scherrie Payne, Mary Wilson and Susaye Greene. (From Disc 2 - tracks 12 to 20)

== Contents ==
One asterisk (*) designates a previously unreleased recording.

Two asterisks (**) designate a previously released recording in a previously unreleased (or, in many cases, new) mix

== Track listing ==
=== Disc one ===
1. "Up the Ladder to the Roof"
2. "Everybody's Got the Right to Love"
3. "The Loving Country"
4. "Life Beats" *
5. "Together We Can Make Such Sweet Music"
6. "Stoned Love"
7. "It's Time To Break Down"
8. "River Deep - Mountain High" (with the Four Tops)
9. "Nathan Jones"
10. "Touch"
11. "Function at the Junction" (with the Four Tops) *
12. "Love the One You're With" (with the Four Tops)
13. "Oh My Poor Baby" *
14. "Make It With You" *
15. "I'll Let Him Know That I Love Him" *
16. "Never Can Say Goodbye" *
17. "Walk With Me, Talk With Me Darling" *
18. "Floy Joy"
19. "Automatically Sunshine" **
20. "Your Wonderful, Sweet Sweet Love"
21. "When Can Brown Begin"
22. "I Keep It Hid"

=== Disc two ===
1. "All I Want"
2. "I Guess I'll Miss the Man"
3. "Bad Weather"
4. "Love Train" **
5. "The Sha-La Bandit" **
6. "It's All Been Said Before"
7. "He's My Man" **
8. "Give Out, But Don't Give Up"
9. "Where Do I Go From Here"
10. "Bend a Little" *
11. "Can We Love Again" *
12. "High Energy" **
13. "I'm Gonna Let My Heart Do the Walking"
14. "You're What's Missing In My Life"
15. "Don't Let My Teardrops Bother You" **
16. "There's Room at the Top" *
17. "You're My Driving Wheel"
18. "Let Yourself Go"
19. "Love I Never Knew You Could Feel So Good"
20. "We Should Be Closer Together"

== Credits ==
- Originally recorded from 1969 to 1976.
- Lead Vocals: Jean Terrell, Mary Wilson, Scherrie Payne, Susaye Greene, and Levi Stubbs
- Background Vocals: Jean Terrell, Mary Wilson, Cindy Birdsong, Lynda Lawrence, Scherrie Payne, Susaye Greene, Levi Stubbs, Renaldo "Obie" Benson, Lawrence Payton, and Abdul "Duke" Fakir, The Blossoms, The Blackberries, The Andantes
- Producers: Frank Wilson, Johnny Bistol, Nickolas Ashford & Valerie Simpson, Smokey Robinson, Jimmy Webb, Stevie Wonder, Clay McMurray, Henry Crosby, Pamela Sawyer, Gloria Jones, and Holland-Dozier-Holland
- Instrumentation: The Funk Brothers and L.A. session artists
