= Mary Wilson: The Motown Anthology =

Compilation album by Mary Wilson
- Released: January 7, 2022 (physical) March 4, 2022 (digital)
- Recorded: 1960–2021
- Studio: Various
- Genre: R&B, soul, show tune, folk rock, pop, disco, funk
- Length: 2 hours and 37 minutes
- Label: UMG, Motown, Real Gone Music, Second Disc Records

Mary Wilson chronology
Up Close: Live from San Francisco (2007)	Mary Wilson: The Motown Anthology (2022)

Professional ratings
Review scores
Source	Rating
American Songwriter	3/5 stars
SoulTracks	('Highly recommended')
Uncut	3.5/5 stars

Mary Wilson: The Motown Anthology is a two disc collection of music, spanning the career of singer Mary Wilson of the American musical group the Supremes. The compilation compiles some of Mary's leads for the Supremes and their original group The Primettes, and includes the CD debut of her Motown solo album, with a total of seven unreleased tracks and 13 unreleased mixes or alternate takes.

== Background ==
In a message to fans via YouTube recorded two days before her death in February 2021, Wilson shared the news: "I finally decided how to work with Universal Records and they are going to release new Mary Wilson recordings. Yes! At last! At last."

In October 2021, Real Gone Music in partnership with Second Disc Records announced a physical compilation entitled Mary Wilson: The Motown Anthology. It included the original Mary Wilson LP (available for the first time on compact disc), including a track entitled "Anytime at All", which is an early version of the single "Red Hot". The Anthology features a total of thirty eight tracks, highlighting Wilson's career from the Primettes, to the Supremes, to a solo artist, to her final single, "Why Can't We All Get Along".

== Track listing ==
Disc One

The Supremes:

1. "Pretty Baby"
2. "Baby Don't Go" (Alternate Mix) (*)
3. "The Tears" (Alternate Mix)
4. "Our Day Will Come" - (Alternate Mix) (*)
5. "Come and Get These Memories" - (Alternate Mix)
6. "Can't Take My Eyes Off You" (Frankie Valli cover) - (Live at the Frontier - January 13, 1970) (**)
7. "Falling In Love With Love" (Live at the Frontier - January 13, 1970) (**)
8. "Send Him to Me" (**)
9. "If You Let Me Baby" (**)
10. "Son of a Preacher Man" (**)
11. "Witchi Tai To" (**)
12. "Touch" (Alternate Mix) (*)
13. "Floy Joy" (Alternate Mix) (*)
14. "Automatically Sunshine" (Alternate Mix) (*)
15. "I Keep It Hid" (Alternate Vocal and Mix) (***)
16. "Can We Love Again" (Alternate Mix)
17. "Early Morning Love" (Alternate Vocal and Mix) (***)
18. "You Turn Me Around" (Alternate Mix) (*)
19. "You're What's Missing in My Life" (Alternate Version)
20. "Don't Let My Teardrops Bother You" (Alternate Vocal and Mix) (***)
21. "Til the Boat Sails Away" (Alternate Vocal and Mix) (***)
22. "I Don't Want To Lose You" (Alternate Vocal and Mix) (***)

Disc Two

The Supremes:

1. "We Should Be Closer Together" (Alternate Vocal and Mix) (***)
2. "You Are the Heart of Me" (Alternate Vocal and Mix) (***)

Mary Wilson:

1. "Anytime at All" (early version of "Red Hot") (**)
2. "Red Hot" (#)
3. "I've Got What You Need" (#)
4. "You Make Me Feel So Good" (#)
5. "(I Love a) Warm Summer Night" (#)
6. "Pick Up the Pieces" (#)
7. "You're the Light That Guides My Way" (#)
8. "Midnight Dancer" (#)
9. "Save Me" (#)
10. "Love Talk" (#)
11. "Green River" (#)
12. "You Danced My Heart Around the Stars"
13. "Why Can't We All Get Along" (LP Version) (**)
14. "Red Hot" (Eric Kupper Remix) (#)
- (*) previously unreleased mix
- (**) previously unreleased track
- (***) previously unreleased vocal and mix
- (#) previously unreleased on CD

== Personnel ==
- Barbara Martin - background vocals (Disc One, tracks 1–3)
- Florence Ballard - background vocals (Disc One, tracks 1–3, 5)
- Diana Ross - background vocals (Disc One, tracks 1–3, 6–7)
- Cindy Birdsong - background vocals (Disc One, tracks 6–7, 9, 11, 12–14, 16–22)
- Jean Terrell - background vocals (Disc One, tracks 9, 12–15)
- Lynda Laurence - background vocals (Disc One, track 15)
- Scherrie Payne - background vocals (Disc One, tracks 16–22 / Disc Two, track 2)
- Susaye Greene - background vocals (Disc One, track 22 / Disc Two, tracks 1–2)
- The Andantes - background vocals (Disc One, tracks 4–5, 13–14)
- Gloria Scott - background vocals
- Julia Tillman Waters - background vocals
- Maxine Willard Waters - background vocals
- Clydene Jackson - background vocals
- Bill Woodruff - background vocals
- Andy Skurow - Compilation producer
- George Solomon - Compilation producer
- Joe Marchese - Compilation producer
- Liner note contributors: Dionne Warwick, Darlene Love, Otis Williams of The Temptations, Duke Fakir of The Four Tops, Martha Reeves, Claudette Robinson, Brian Holland, Edward Holland, Rita Coolidge, Merry Clayton, Brenda Russell, Blinky Williams, Jackie DeShannon, and Hillary Rodham Clinton.
- Songwriters: Berry Gordy Jr., Smokey Robinson, Holland-Dozier-Holland, Deke Richards, Barry Mann, Cynthia Weil, Thom Bell and Linda Creed.
