= The Supremes Produced and Arranged by Jimmy Webb =

Studio album by The Supremes
- Released: November 1972
- Recorded: March–June 1972
- Genres: Pop, rock, soul
- Label: Motown
- Producers: Jimmy Webb, Sherlie Matthews, Deke Richards

The Supremes chronology
Floy Joy (1972)	The Supremes Produced and Arranged by Jimmy Webb (1972)	The Supremes Live! In Japan (1973)

Singles from The Supremes Produced and Arranged by Jimmy Webb
- 1. "I Guess I'll Miss the Man" Released: September 15, 1972; 2. "Tossin' And Turnin" Released: 1973

The Supremes Produced and Arranged by Jimmy Webb is the twenty-sixth studio album released by The Supremes on the Motown label in 1972. It stands as a unique entry in The Supremes' discography as it was the only album produced (and primarily written) by a non-Motown artist, the accomplished songwriter and producer Jimmy Webb. This album also marked the first appearance of Lynda Laurence, and the final appearance of Jean Terrell as the lead singer of The Supremes during the early 1970s.

In the United States, only one single from the album was released, the emotive ballad "I Guess I'll Miss the Man," originally from the musical Pippin. Additionally, the album features renditions of songs outside of Webb's contributions, such as Joni Mitchell's "All I Want," Harry Nilsson's "Paradise," and covers of hits by Bobby Lewis and Mina, specifically "Tossin' and Turnin'" and "Il Voce Del Silenzio" respectively.

Released at the same time as Diana Ross' Lady Sings The Blues movie and soundtrack, Motown gave no promotion to this unusual album. It became the group's poorest selling studio album since Meet The Supremes nearly 10 years prior. Unnerved by this and the failure of the Stevie Wonder-produced "Bad Weather" single a few months later, Jean Terrell abruptly left the group, followed shortly thereafter by Lynda Laurence.

== Critical reception ==
Professional ratings
Review scores
Source	Rating
Cashbox	(Favorable)
Christgau's Record Guide	C+
Rolling Stone	(Favorable)

Cashbox published, "Jimmy Webb produced and arranged this most satisfying Supremes creation since the group's re-organization. The unquestionable highlight of the session is a foamin' funky remake of Bobby Lewis' "Tossin' And Turnin'." Also on the upswing, Joni Mitchell's "All I Want" (complete with "Up Up And Away" riffs) and a strange lyrical bit of "Cheap Lovin'." On the sweet side, their latest single "Guess I'll Miss The Man" from "Pippin" and a beautiful "Silent Voices." They've got the feelin' and the talent to put it across."

== Track listing ==
All songs produced and arranged by Jimmy Webb, except "I Guess I'll Miss the Man" produced by Sherlie Matthews and Deke Richards, arranged by James Carmichael and Gene Page.

All lead vocals by Jean Terrell except where noted.

=== Side one ===
1. "I Guess I'll Miss the Man" (Stephen Schwartz)
2. "5:30 Plane" (Jimmy Webb)
3. "Tossin' and Turnin'" (Bobby Lewis, Malou Rene)
4. "When Can Brown Begin?" (Webb)
5. "Beyond Myself" (Webb)
6. "Il Voce Del Silenzio (Silent Voices)" (Elio Isola)

=== Side two ===
1. "All I Want" (Joni Mitchell)
2. "Once in the Morning" (Webb) (lead singers: Jean Terrell, Jimmy Webb)
3. "I Keep It Hid" (Webb) (lead singer: Mary Wilson)
4. "Paradise" (Harry Nilsson, Phil Spector, Perry Botkin Jr., Gil Garfield)
5. "Cheap Lovin'" (Webb)

== Personnel ==
- Jean Terrell – lead and backing vocals
- Mary Wilson – lead and backing vocals
- Lynda Laurence – backing vocals
- Jimmy Webb – producer, arranger, composer, keyboards, vocals
- Henry Lewy – engineer
- Ray Rich – drums
- Fred Tackett – guitar
- Skip Mosher – bass guitar
- Jim Britt – photography

== Charts ==
Chart (1972)	Peak position
US Billboard 200	129
US Top R&B/Hip-Hop Albums (Billboard)	27
US Cashbox Top 100	107
US Record World	104
