= A Very Special Season =

Studio album by Diana Ross
- Released: November 14, 1994
- Genre: Holiday; R&B
- Length: 56:22
- Label: EMI
- Producer: Nick Martinelli

Diana Ross chronology
Diana Extended: The Remixes (1994)	A Very Special Season (1994)	Take Me Higher (1995)

A Very Special Season is the twentieth studio album and first holiday album by American singer Diana Ross, released on November 14, 1994, by EMI Records. Produced by Nick Martinelli, whom Ross worked with several times around the early nineties, it is a lush, soulful pop album, consisting mostly of traditional Christmas standards as well as takes on more contemporary songs by Burt Bacharach, John Lennon, and Stevie Wonder. The set was only released for the international market where it peaked at number 37 on the UK Albums Chart and was certified Gold by the British Phonographic Industry (BPI).

The album was remastered and repackaged as Wonderful Christmas Time in 2018. The re-titled re-issue of the album, issued by Ross' own label Ross Records, featured new cover art and the six-tracks that Ross had originally recorded for the 1994 Hallmark album, Making Spirits Bright, featuring the London Symphony Orchestra. Ross promoted the release with performances in the Macy's Thanksgiving Day Parade, and at the Rockefeller Center Tree-lighting concert special in November 2018.

== Critical reception ==
Professional ratings
Review scores
Source	Rating
AllMusic	4/5 stars

Allmusic editor Jose F. Promis found that A Very Special Season "easily ranks among the diva's best of the '90s. Instead of opting for hip arrangements aimed at pleasing a younger, jaded audience, all the songs on this set are classically arranged with lush orchestrations, resulting in a truly timeless holiday album, not unlike what one would have expected from the crooners and sirens of yesteryear. The songs are all lovingly produced, and Ross effectively wraps her silken pipes around each tune with utmost sincerity."

== Track listing ==
All songs produced by Nick Martinelli.

No.	Title	Writer(s)	Length
1.	"Winter Wonderland"	Felix Bernard; Richard B. Smith	3:22
2.	"White Christmas"	Irving Berlin	3:20
3.	"Wonderful Christmastime"	Paul McCartney	3:09
4.	"What the World Needs Now"	Burt Bacharach; Hal David	4:20
5.	"Happy Xmas (War Is Over)"	John Lennon; Yoko Ono	3:15
6.	"Let It Snow! Let It Snow! Let It Snow!"	Sammy Cahn; Jule Styne	2:14
7.	"Amazing Grace"	John Newton	5:21
8.	"His Eye Is on the Sparrow"	Civilla D. Martin	5:21
9.	"Silent Night"	Franz Gruber; Josef Mohr	5:01
10.	"Overjoyed"	Stevie Wonder	4:05
11.	"O Holy Night"	Adolphe Adam; John Sullivan Dwight	4:44
12.	"Someday at Christmas"	Ron Miller; Bryan Wells	4:09
13.	"Ave Maria"	Franz Schubert	5:52
14.	"The Christmas Song"	Mel Tormé; Robert Wells	3:13

Wonderful Christmas Time (2018 reissue)
No.	Title	Writer(s)	Length
1.	"Wonderful Christmastime"	McCartney	3:09
2.	"Sleigh Ride"/"Jingle Bells"	Leroy Anderson; Mitchell Parish; James Lord Pierpont	3:40
3.	"Winter Wonderland"	Bernard; Smith	3:22
4.	"It's Christmas Time"	Traditional	3:18
5.	"White Christmas"	Berlin	3:20
6.	"Let It Snow! Let It Snow! Let It Snow!"	Cahn; Styne	2:14
7.	"The Christmas Song"	Tormé; Wells	3:13
8.	"Overjoyed"	Wonder	4:05
9.	"Someday at Christmas"	Miller; Wells	4:09
10.	"What the World Needs Now"	Bacharach; David	4:20
11.	"Amazing Grace"	Newton	5:21
12.	"His Eye Is on the Sparrow"	Martin	5:21
13.	"Silent Night"	Gruber; Mohr	5:01
14.	"O Holy Night"	Adam; Dwight	4:44
15.	"O Little Town of Bethlehem"	Phillips Brooks	4:25
16.	"Ave Maria"	Schubert	5:52
17.	"Go Tell It on the Mountain"	John Wesley Work Jr.	5:08
18.	"The First Noël"	Traditional	3:30
19.	"I Heard the Bells"	Traditional	2:53
20.	"Happy Xmas (War Is Over)"	Lennon; Ono	3:15

== Charts ==
Chart (1994)	Peak position
Dutch Albums (Album Top 100)	93
UK Albums (OCC)	37

== Certifications ==
Region	Certification	Certified units/sales
United Kingdom (BPI)	Gold	100,000^{^}
^{^} Shipments figures based on certification alone.
