= The Composer =

Single by Diana Ross & the Supremes

from the album Let the Sunshine In
- B-side: "The Beginning of the End"
- Released: March 27, 1969
- Genre: Pop
- Length: 2:58
- Label: Motown; M 1146
- Songwriter: Smokey Robinson
- Producer: Smokey Robinson

Diana Ross & the Supremes singles chronology
"I'll Try Something New" (1969)	"The Composer" (1969)	"No Matter What Sign You Are" (1969)

Let the Sunshine In track listing
- 12 tracks Side one: 1. "The Composer"; 2. "Everyday People"; 3. "No Matter What Sign You Are"; 4. "Hey Western Union Man"; 5. "What Becomes of the Brokenhearted"; 6. "I'm Livin' in Shame"; Side two: 7. Medley: "Aquarius/Let the Sunshine In (The Flesh Failures)"; 8. "Let the Music Play"; 9. "With a Child's Heart"; 10. "Discover Me (and You'll Discover Love)"; 11. "Will This Be the Day"; 12. "I'm So Glad I Got Somebody (Like You Around)"

"The Composer" is a 1969 song released for Diana Ross & the Supremes by the Motown label.

== Background ==
Written and produced by Smokey Robinson, the song is featured on their album Let the Sunshine In and peaked at number 27 on the Billboard Hot 100 pop singles chart in the United States in May 1969. It was not released as a single in the UK. As with many Diana Ross & the Supremes singles recorded between 1968 and 1969, Mary Wilson and Cindy Birdsong did not sing on the record but rather Motown session singers The Andantes. "The Composer" is one of only a few Supremes releases that was not performed on any television show. The song was rerecorded by Smokey Robinson & the Miracles for their 1969 album, Time Out for Smokey Robinson & the Miracles.

Cash Box described it as "a sumptuous love song filled with the imagery of 'I Hear a Symphony'" and "standout production touches."

== Personnel ==
- Lead vocals by Diana Ross
- Background vocals by the Andantes: Jackie Hicks, Marlene Barrow, and Louvain Demps
- Instrumentation by the Funk Brothers

== Track listing ==
- 7" single (27 March 1969) (North America/Germany/Netherlands)
1. "The Composer" – 2:55
2. "The Beginning of the End" – 2:29

== Chart history ==
Chart (1969)	Peak position
Australia (Kent Music Report)	87
Canada Top Singles (RPM)	14
Netherlands (Dutch Top 40 Tipparade)	20
US Billboard Hot 100	27
US Hot R&B/Hip-Hop Songs (Billboard)	21
US Cashbox Top 100	21
US Cashbox R&B	14
US Record World 100 Top Pops	21
US Record World Top 50 R&B	11
