= I Walk the Line (disambiguation) =

"I Walk the Line" is a 1956 song written by Johnny Cash

I Walk the Line may also refer to:

- I Walk the Line (1964 album), an album by Johnny Cash
- I Walk the Line (film), a 1970 film directed by John Frankenheimer
  - I Walk the Line (soundtrack album), with songs by Johnny Cash
- "I Walk the Line Revisited", a 2001 song by Rodney Crowell featuring Johnny Cash

== See also ==
- Walk the Line (disambiguation)
