= Up Close: Live from San Francisco =

Live album by Mary Wilson
- Released: 2009
- Recorded: 2008
- Venue: The Empire Plush Room at The York Hotel
- Genre: R&B
- Label: N/A
- Producer: Mary Wilson

DVD cover

Up Close: Live from San Francisco is a live set of standards/cover songs recorded at the Empire Plush Room at The York Hotel in San Francisco. The concert was held for two weeks from December 4 to December 16, 2008. It was released as limited edition live album and DVD set in 2009 by singer Mary Wilson, former member of The Supremes.

== Track listing ==
1. "Here's to Life" - cover of Shirley Horn song
2. "Smile"
3. "Body and Soul"
4. "I Believe in You and Me" - cover of The Four Tops song
5. "Spring Is Here"
6. "Fields of Gold" - cover of Sting song
7. "I Remember You/The Girl from Ipanema/Mas Que Nada"
8. "New York State of Mind" - cover of Billy Joel song
9. "Don't Know Why" - cover of Norah Jones song
10. "My World Is Empty Without You" - cover of The Supremes song
11. "Tears in Heaven" - cover of Eric Clapton song
12. "I Am Changing" - from the Broadway play "Dreamgirls"
13. "Both Sides, Now" - cover of Joni Mitchell song
14. "What a Wonderful World" - cover of Louis Armstrong song

== Personnel ==
- Mary Wilson - vocals
- Ray Parnell - guitar and vocals
- Daniel Fabricant - acoustic bass
- Winston Byrd - trumpet
- Mark Zier - piano
- Donzell Davis - drums

== Production credits ==
- Mary Wilson - Executive Producer
