= Walk the Line (Mary Wilson album) =

Studio album by Mary Wilson
- Released: August 18, 1992
- Recorded: 1991–1992
- Genre: R&B
- Length: 36:20
- Label: CEO
- Producer: Paul Recinos, Randy Waldman, James H. Cooper

Mary Wilson chronology
Mary Wilson (1979)	Walk the Line (1992)

Walk the Line is the second and final solo studio album released by former Supremes member Mary Wilson in 1992 on the independent CEO Records label.

The album was Wilson's first solo album to be released since her debut album, Mary Wilson, in 1979 on Motown Records. Wilson had begun work on a second solo album in 1980, working with English record producer, Gus Dudgeon. Dudgeon had produced 4 tracks for the album but Motown dropped Wilson from the label before the album was completed. After leaving Motown, Wilson almost signed with Atlantic Records in 1987, recording three songs for the label: "Sleeping in Separate Rooms", "Stronger in a Broken Part" and "The One I Love". All three songs remain unreleased by professional sources.

In 1987, Wilson recorded the song "Don't Get Mad, Get Even" for Nightmare Records (which later turned into Motorcity Records) and later signed with the company founded by Ian Levine. Wilson recorded and released her cover version of the Five Stairsteps's classic hit "Ooh Child" on the Motorcity label in 1989 but never recorded a full album for the label. Wilson soon after signed with CEO Records (Cooper Entertainment Organization) and released Walk the Line in 1992.

A day after Walk the Line was released, CEO went into bankruptcy. Wilson later claimed that she had no knowledge of the label's financial troubles and stated that she was coerced into signing with them for the release. Because of the bankruptcy issue with the label, Walk the Line fell out of place on the Billboard charts despite Wilson's promotion efforts.

Although six original songs were recorded for the release, the album features covers of "Ooh Child", "You Keep Me Hangin' On", Glenn Medeiros and The Jets 1989 single "Under Any Moon" from The Jets album Believe and The Karate Kid Part III soundtrack as well as Jennifer Holliday's song "I Am Changing" from the original Dreamgirls broadway play. During the recording sessions, Wilson recorded an updated version of The Supremes' #1 single "Love Child", complete with vocal rap by Ako Mack (the background track was the same one as used by Sweet Sensation on their 1990 cover of the song). This track was however replaced in favor of another Supremes #1 hit, "You Keep Me Hangin' On" which she performed at It's Showtime at the Apollo. Ako Mack contributed a rap verse to the album cut "The Stare".

Wilson also performed "Walk the Line" on The Arsenio Hall Show and released music videos for the song and another album cut "One Night with You".

On September 11, 2013, the album's title track, "Walk the Line", was released to Wilson's iTunes page.

== Track listing ==
1. "Walk the Line" (Dee Harvey, Tena Clark) - 4:00
2. "The Stare" [featuring Ako Mack] (Anthony Smith, Dyna Brein, Ted Jacobs) - 3:08
3. "You Keep Me Hangin' On" (Holland-Dozier-Holland) - 3:48
4. "One Night With You" (Antonina Armato, Rick Neigher) - 3:44
5. "All Over Now" (Randy Waldman, Suzi Carr) - 3:44
6. "Ooh Child" (Stan Vincent) - 4:35
7. "Under Any Moon" (Diane Warren) - 4:12
8. "Shelter Me" (Jack White, Mark Spiro) - 3:17
9. "Bodyguard" (Geoff Hurley) - 3:27
10. "I Am Changing" (Henry Krieger, Tom Eyen) - 3:45
