= Mary Wilson (singer) =

American singer (1944–2021)

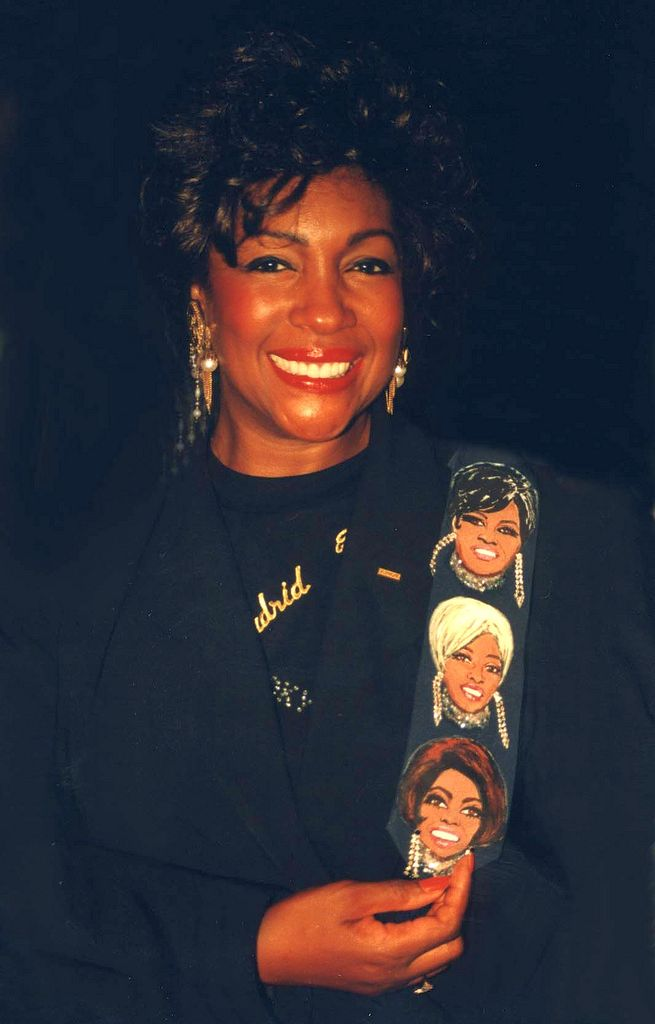
- Wilson at the Peabody institute in Baltimore in September 1994
- Born: March 6, 1944; Greenville, Mississippi, U.S.
- Died: February 8, 2021 (aged 76); Henderson, Nevada, U.S.
- Occupation: Singer
- Years active: 1959–2021
- Spouse: Pedro Ferrer (m. 1974; div. 1981)
- Children: 3
- Musical career
- Genres: R&B; soul; pop; dance; disco; funk
- Instruments: Vocals
- Labels: Motown; CEO
- Website: marywilson.com

Mary Wilson (March 6, 1944 – February 8, 2021) was an American singer. She gained worldwide recognition as a founding member of the Supremes, the most successful Motown act of the 1960s and the best-charting female group in U.S. chart history, as well as one of the best-selling girl groups of all-time. The trio reached number one on Billboard's Hot 100 with 12 of their singles, (Note: "Where Did Our Love Go", "Baby Love", "Come See About Me", "Stop! In the Name of Love", "Back in My Arms Again", "I Hear a Symphony", "You Can't Hurry Love", "You Keep Me Hangin' On", "Love is Here and Now You're Gone", "The Happening", "Love Child", and "Someday We'll Be Together". Wilson however did not sing background on "Love Child" or "Someday We'll Be Together".) 10 of which feature Wilson on backing vocals.

Wilson remained with the group following the departures of the other three original members: Barbara Martin (in 1962), Florence Ballard (in 1967), and Diana Ross (in 1970), though the subsequent group disbanded following Wilson's own departure in 1977. Wilson later became a New York Times best-selling author in 1986 with the release of her first autobiography, Dreamgirl: My Life as a Supreme, which set records for sales in its genre, and later for the autobiography Supreme Faith: Someday We'll Be Together.

Continuing a successful career as a concert performer in Las Vegas, Wilson also worked in activism, fighting to pass Truth in Music Advertising bills and donating to various charities. Wilson was inducted along with Ross and Ballard (as members of the Supremes) into the Rock and Roll Hall of Fame in 1988.

== Early life ==
Mary Wilson was born on March 6, 1944, to Sam, a butcher, and Johnnie Mae Wilson in Greenville, Mississippi. She was the eldest of three children including a brother, Roosevelt, and a sister, Cathy. The Wilsons moved to Chicago, part of the Great Migration in which her father joined many African Americans seeking work in the North, but at age three, Mary Wilson was taken in by her aunt Ivory "I.V." and uncle John L. Pippin in Detroit. Her parents eventually separated and Wilson's mother and siblings later joined them in Detroit, though by then Wilson had come to believe I.V. was her real mother. Wilson and her family had settled in the Brewster-Douglass Housing Projects, a housing project in Detroit where Wilson first met Florence Ballard. The duo became friends while singing in their school's talent show. In 1959, Ballard asked Wilson to audition for Milton Jenkins, who was forming a sister group to his male vocal trio, the Primes (two members of which were later in The Temptations). Wilson was soon accepted into the group known as the Primettes, with Diana Ross and Betty McGlown, who lived in the same housing project with Wilson and Ballard. In this period, Wilson also met Aretha, Erma and Carolyn Franklin, daughters of the pastor at her local Baptist church.

Wilson graduated from Detroit's Northeastern High School in January 1962.

== Career ==
=== The Supremes: 1959–1977 ===
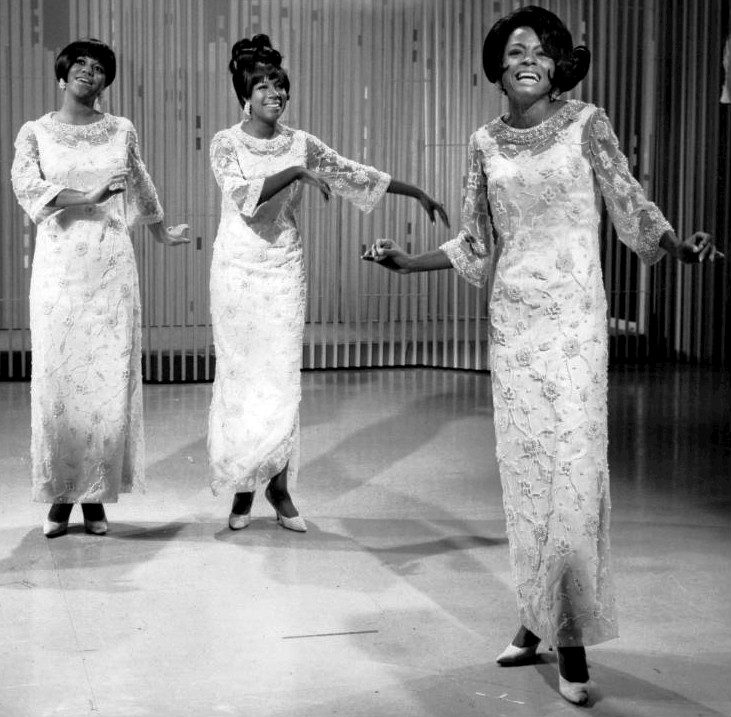
Wilson (middle) performing with the Supremes

In 1960, the Primettes signed a contract with Lu Pine Records, issuing two singles from which Wilson sang lead vocals on "Pretty Baby". Shortly after, McGlown left to get married and was replaced by Barbara Martin. During that year, they kept pursuing a Motown contract and agreed to do anything that was required, including adding handclaps and vocal backgrounds. By the end of the year, Berry Gordy agreed to have the group record songs in the studio. In January 1961, Gordy relented and agreed to sign the girls to his label on the condition they change their name. Motown lyricist Janie Bradford approached Ballard with a list of names to choose from before Ballard chose "Supremes". Gordy agreed to sign them under that name on January 15, 1961.

The group struggled in their early years in comparison to other Motown acts, garnering the nickname "no-hit Supremes" as a result. One track, "Buttered Popcorn", led by Ballard, was a regional hit, but still failed to chart. Before the release of their 1962 debut album, Meet The Supremes, Martin had become pregnant and subsequently left the group, leaving the Supremes as a trio.

In December 1963, the single "When the Lovelight Starts Shining Through His Eyes" peaked at number 23 on the Billboard Hot 100. Following the single's success, Gordy assigned Ross as the group's lead singer. In the spring of 1964, the Supremes released "Where Did Our Love Go", which became their first number-one hit on the Billboard Hot 100, paving the way for 10 number-one hits recorded by Ross, Ballard, and Wilson between 1964 and 1967.

By 1965, the group had become international stars, appearing regularly on television programs such as Hullabaloo, The Hollywood Palace, The Dean Martin Show, and, most notably The Ed Sullivan Show, on which they made 17 appearances. As early as 1966, Ballard's chronic alcoholism led to her missing press conferences and recording sessions. To serve as a stand-in for Ballard, Gordy selected Cindy Birdsong, a member of Patti LaBelle and the Blue Belles. In July 1967, following a contentious performance at the Flamingo, Ballard was removed from the Supremes and replaced with Birdsong. Simultaneously, Gordy renamed the group "Diana Ross & the Supremes", beginning with the single "Reflections". In 1968, Wilson sung lead on "The Ballad of Davy Crockett", a cover the group recorded for their album Diana Ross & the Supremes Sing Disney Classics in 1968. The album was shelved and never released. However, the song still appeared on the 1987 compilation The Never-Before-Released Masters. In 1969, Wilson sang the duet "Can't Take My Eyes Off You" (a Frankie Valli cover) with Eddie Kendricks for the album Together, in preparation for Ross' departure from the Supremes with many assuming she would step up and eventually take the lead in the group.

The new lineup continued to record hit singles, although several stalled outside the top 20 chart range. Ross left the group in January 1970, and at her farewell performance Jean Terrell was introduced as the replacement for Ross. According to Wilson, Gordy told Wilson that he thought of having Syreeta Wright join the group in a last-minute change, after Terrell had already been introduced as lead singer, to which Wilson refused. From there, Gordy relinquished creative control of the group over to Wilson. With Terrell, the group reverted to the name "the Supremes;" known unofficially at first as "the New Supremes", and in later years informally called "The '70s Supremes". The Wilson-Birdsong-Terrell lineup recorded seven top-40 hit singles in a three-year period, including "River Deep/Mountain High" (with the Four Tops), "Up the Ladder to the Roof", "Stoned Love", "Nathan Jones", and "Floy Joy". Unlike the latter years with Ross, the single "Automatically Sunshine" only succeeded in reaching the top 20 charts.

1970 Motown advertisement in Billboard for the single "Stoned Love" and the album New Ways but Love Stays

In 1972, Wilson took the lead on "I Keep It Hid", from The Supremes Produced and Arranged by Jimmy Webb. That same year, Cindy Birdsong left the group following marriage and pregnancy and was replaced by Lynda Laurence (then Tucker). The group's popularity and place on record charts dropped significantly. For the first time in a decade, two singles in a row failed to break into the top 40: The Stevie Wonder penned-and-produced "Bad Weather", and "I Guess I'll Miss the Man", written by Stephen Schwartz. Discouraged, Jean Terrell and Lynda Laurence both departed in late 1973. Scherrie Payne was recruited from a group called The Glass House, and Cindy Birdsong returned. Beginning with this lineup change, Wilson began doing almost half of the group's lead vocal duties, as she was considered the group's main attraction and reason for continuing.

In 1975, Wilson sang lead on the Top 10 disco hit "Early Morning Love", which was released as a single in the United Kingdom only from the album, The Supremes. In 1976, the group scored its final Top 40 hit single with "I'm Gonna Let My Heart Do the Walking", written and produced by Brian and Eddie Holland and included on the album High Energy. Birdsong again departed, just before the album's release, and was replaced by the group's final official member, Susaye Greene, whose voice was dubbed over two songs. High Energy was well-received, but the follow-up album Mary, Scherrie & Susaye, released in 1977, would be their last. During a meeting with Motown, Wilson's husband Pedro Ferrer had notified Motown that Wilson would leave the Supremes to embark on a solo career. On June 12, 1977, Wilson gave her farewell performance with the Supremes at London's Drury Lane Theatre. Meanwhile, Payne and Greene had planned to continue as the Supremes, but a replacement for Wilson proved to be unsuccessful, in which the Supremes officially disbanded.

=== Solo career: 1977–2021 ===
In July 1977, just one month following her farewell performance with the Supremes, Wilson began a touring "Supremes" show with two background singers as the "Mary Wilson of The Supremes" show. The show was the result of Motown's allowance of the group to go into hiatus despite the fact that there were still several uncancelled international tour dates to complete. Mary therefore hired former Supreme, Cindy Birdsong and Debbie Sharpe to complete a summer tour of South America to fulfill contracts so venues would not sue. The three-week tour began in Caracas, Venezuela, and was composed of mostly small clubs. Despite the company's displeasure and the fact that it owned the rights/distribution rights to the name "Supremes", Motown never cancelled the tour. Later that year, Wilson hired Karen Jackson and Kaaren Ragland to tour with as background singers. She and Cindy rehearsed them for a year end's tour of Europe, that was composed of dates at officers' clubs and swank discos.

After an out-of-court settlement, Wilson signed with Motown for solo work, releasing a disco-heavy self-titled album in August 1979. A single from the album, "Red Hot", peaked at number 90 on the pop charts. Midway through production of a second solo album in 1980, Motown dropped her from their roster. Throughout the mid-1980s, Wilson focused on performances in musical theater productions, including Beehive, Dancing in the Streets, and Supreme Soul.

In 1983, Wilson appeared on the Motown 25: Yesterday, Today, Forever television special. Early in the program, Wilson made a brief tribute to Florence Ballard, and former label mate Paul Williams of the Temptations. Later, she joined Diana Ross and Cindy Birdsong for a highly anticipated Supremes reunion. Wilson found major success once more with her memoir: Dreamgirl: My Life as a Supreme in 1986. The book remained on the national best-seller list for months and established a sales record for the genre. The book focused on the early career of the Supremes and its success during the 1960s. Four years later, in 1990, Wilson released her second memoir: Supreme Faith: Someday We'll Be Together, also a best seller, which focused on the Supremes in the 1970s. In between this period, Wilson became a frequent guest on several television programs and talk shows and began regularly performing in Las Vegas casinos and resorts. Wilson then recorded a cover version of "Ooh Child" for the Motorcity label in 1990. In 1992 she signed with CEO Records and released the album, Walk the Line. The label filed for bankruptcy the day after its national release. Wilson maintained that she was deceived about the financial status of the label. The available copies of the album quickly sold out, however, and Wilson continued her success as a concert performer. Earlier in 1974, Wilson had her contract with Motown re-negotiated to allow her 50% ownership of the name "Supremes". During the 1990s, Wilson filed suit against several former members of the Supremes, who had formed spin-off groups, for improper usage of the Supremes' name. In September 1997, the court sided with the defendant, claiming Motown Records owned the full rights to the group's name, and allowed for the spin-off groups to continue performing. Wilson then appealed the decision to the U.S. Ninth Circuit Court of Appeals in San Francisco, which upheld the prior ruling. This prompted Wilson to take a high-profile role in lobbying for "Truth in Music Advertising" legislation, which prohibits usage of musical acts names, unless an original member of the group is in the act or the group is properly licensed by the last person to hold right of title to the name. Her efforts succeeded in more than 28 U.S. states. In 1995, Wilson released a song, ".U", for Contract Recording Company. A year later, Wilson released the song, "Turn Around" for Da Bridge Records.

In late 1999, a proposal for a Supremes reunion tour was negotiated by Ross and TNA/SFX Productions (now Live Nation Entertainment). According to Wilson, Ross had contacted her that December, long after she had already heard of plans for a reunion tour. Wilson was initially offered $2 million, while Birdsong was reported to have been offered less than $1 million. Wilson disagreed, and a counteroffer of $3 million was made. By March 2000, with salary negotiations still underway, Wilson stated a deal had been accepted between her and Birdsong, but it was rejected by Ross. TNA/SFX then ceased negotiations with Wilson and Birdsong. Instead, the tour, Return to Love, went forward with former Supremes Scherrie Payne and Lynda Lawrence, beginning in Philadelphia on June 14. The opening concert had drawn 10,000 spectators and grossed over $629,000. By July 2000, the tour was reportedly performing below expectations, and was subsequently canceled after 13 concerts. Ross issued a statement that she was "severely disappointed" that SFX had decided to cancel the tour.

That year, Wilson released an updated version of her autobiographies as a single combined book. That same year, an album, I Am Changing, was released by Mary Wilson Enterprises, produced through her and her then-management, Duryea Entertainment.

In 2001, Wilson starred in the national tour of Leader of the Pack – The Ellie Greenwich Story. A year later, Wilson was appointed by Secretary of State Colin Powell as a "culture-connect ambassador" for the U.S. State Department, appearing at international events arranged by that agency. In 2004, Wilson joined Cindy Birdsong and Kelly Rowland (of Destiny's Child) to perform a medley of Supreme hits for the Motown 45 anniversary television special. In 2006, a live concert DVD, Live at the Sands, was released. Four years later, another DVD, Mary Wilson: Live from San Francisco... Up Close, was released. During this period, Wilson became a musical activist, having been part of the Truth in Music Bill, a law proposed to stop impostor groups performing under the names of the 1950s and 1960s rock and roll groups, including Motown groups The Marvelettes and The Supremes. The law was passed in 27 states. Wilson also toured and lectured internationally, as well as across the United States, speaking to multiple groups worldwide. Her lecture series, "Dare to Dream", focuses on reaching goals and triumph over adversity. Wilson's charity work included Children Incorporated, the Susan G. Komen Race for the Cure, the American Cancer Society, St. Jude's Children's Research Hospital, the Easter Seals Foundation, UNICEF, The NAACP, the Cystic Fibrosis Foundation, the All-Star Network, and Figure Skaters of Harlem, a youth organization devoted to helping children towards entering the Olympics. Most recently, Wilson became the Mine Action spokesperson for the Humpty Dumpty Institute.

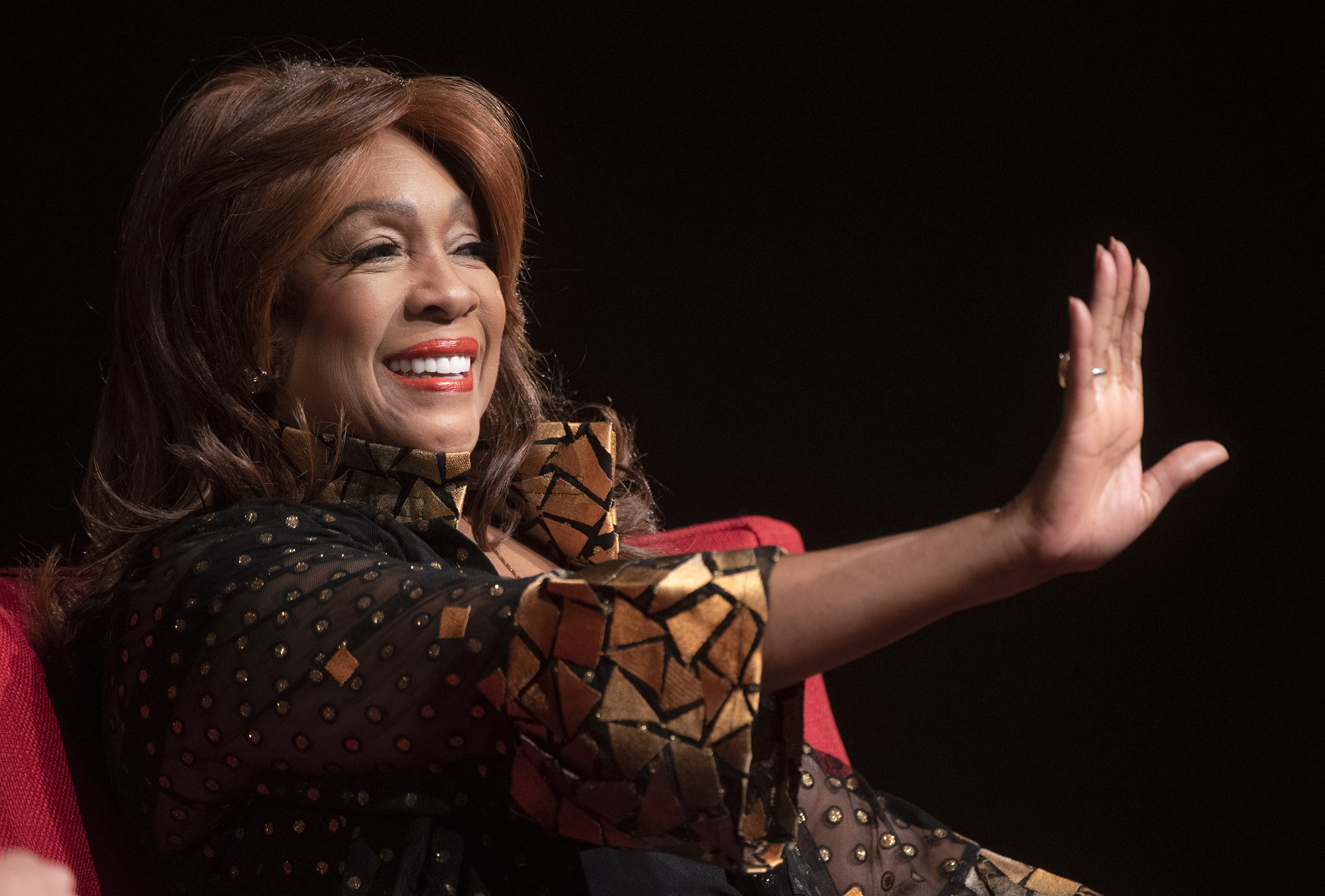
Wilson at the LBJ Presidential Library in 2019

In April 2008, Wilson made a special appearance on 20/20 to participate in a social experiment involving pedestrians reacting to a young woman singing "Stop! In the Name of Love" with intentional amateurishness. Wilson approached the woman and gave her constructive criticism toward her style, in contrast to the pedestrians whose reactions were positive, yet dishonest. On March 5, 2009, she made a special appearance on The Paul O'Grady Show, which ended in a special performance with her, O'Grady, and Graham Norton. Wilson created the "Mary Wilson/Supremes Gown Collection", and had the collection tour in an exhibition of the Supremes' stage wear. The collection has been on exhibit at the Rock & Roll Hall of Fame in Cleveland, Ohio and on May 12, 2008, commenced its UK tour, starting at the Victoria and Albert Museum in London. More than 50 sets of gowns are shown in rotation, starting with early formal wear from the early 1960s, and including famous gowns worn on television specials and nightclub appearances by the group in the 1960s and 1970s.

Wilson released two singles on iTunes, "Life's Been Good To Me" and "Darling Mother (Johnnie Mae)", in 2011 and 2013, respectively. In 2015, Wilson released a new single, "Time To Move On", produced by Sweet Feet Music; the song reached the Top 20 on the Billboard Dance charts history, peaking at No. 17 as of December 26. At 36 years and seven weeks, Mary Wilson holds the record for the longest gap between hits in the Billboard Dance Club Songs chart as "Red Hot" debuted on October 6, 1979 and "Time To Move On" debuted on November 21, 2015.

In 2016, an Indiegogo campaign was launched to help raise $35,000 to fund a gay-themed romantic comedy movie, "Please Don't Eat the Pansies". The cast includes actor/writer Ronnie Kerr, Andrew Lauer, singer/actor Tom Goss, and Wilson.

On August 15, 2019, Wilson published her fourth book, Supreme Glamour with co-author Mark Bego, dedicated to the history of the Supremes and their fashion with a detailed section dedicated to the Supremes gowns in her collection. That same month, she was announced as one of the celebrities who would compete on season 28 of Dancing with the Stars. Wilson and her professional partner Brandon Armstrong were the first couple to be eliminated from the competition on September 23, 2019.

==== Posthumous releases ====
Mary Wilson's single "Why Can't We All Get Along" was released posthumously on March 5, 2021. The song was featured on a 2021 reissue of Wilson's 1979 solo debut entitled, Mary Wilson: Expanded Edition.

Another posthumous project, Mary Wilson: Red Hot Eric Kupper Remix EP was released September 3, 2021. The EP featured three new different dance versions of Wilson's 1979 single "Red Hot" produced by Kupper.

On January 7, 2022, a posthumous compilation album entitled, Mary Wilson: The Motown Anthology, was released physically and released digitally to streaming platforms March 4, 2022.

On March 3, 2023, a posthumous single called, "Soul Defender", which is previously unreleased was released digitally by Universal. The song was written by Billie Ray Martin and produced by Paul Brewer of Sweet Feet Music. Three versions of the track was available: a radio edit, an extended dance mix, and an instrumental version of the radio edit.

== Personal life and death ==
Throughout her career Wilson was romantically linked to Flip Wilson, Steve McQueen, and David Frost among others. Wilson also had a short affair with Tom Jones, and was briefly engaged to Duke Fakir of the Four Tops in the mid-1960s.

Wilson married Dominican businessman Pedro Ferrer, whom she had chosen as the Supremes' manager, in Las Vegas on May 11, 1974. They had three children: daughter Turkessa (b. 1975) and sons Pedro Antonio Jr. (b. 1977) and Rafael (1979–1994). Wilson and Ferrer divorced in 1981. She was also the adoptive mother of her cousin, Willie. In January 1994, Wilson and her 14-year-old son, Rafael, were involved in an accident on Interstate 15 between Los Angeles and Las Vegas when their Jeep Cherokee veered off the highway and overturned. Wilson sustained moderate injuries; Rafael's injuries were fatal.

On February 8, 2021, Wilson died in her sleep from hypertensive atherosclerotic cardiovascular disease at her home in Henderson, Nevada, a suburb of Las Vegas, at the age of 76. Two days before her death, she had announced on YouTube that she was planning to release new solo material with Universal Music Group, and hoped it would come out before March 6, her 77th birthday.

Motown founder Berry Gordy said he was "extremely shocked and saddened" by the news of her death and said Wilson was "quite a star in her own right and over the years continued to work hard to boost the legacy of the Supremes." Diana Ross reflected on Wilson's death, posting on Twitter: "I am reminded that each day is a gift. I have so many wonderful memories of our time together. 'The Supremes' will live on in our hearts." Ross would later say to Entertainment Tonight, "I remember Mary's joy and love during happier times and our love and years together. I recall 'the good old days' with a smile in my heart and a song in my heart during these changing times."

At the time of her death, Wilson had 10 grandchildren and one great-granddaughter.

Wilson was interred next to her son Rafael on March 16, 2021, at Holy Cross Cemetery in Culver City, California.

== Honors ==
In 2001, Wilson earned a degree from New York University's School of Continuing and Professional Studies.

Wilson was awarded an honorary Doctorate of Humane Letters from Paine College in Augusta, Georgia.

In 2020, Wilson received a Lifetime Achievement Award from the National Newspaper Publishers Association. Wilson was also, along with The Supremes, inducted into National Rhythm & Blues Hall of Fame class of 2013. Wilson also served as the master of ceremonies for the National Rhythm & Blues Hall of Fame from 2016 to 2019 and served as a board member.

== Legacy ==
The character of Lorrell Robinson in both the play and film versions of Dreamgirls was inspired by Wilson.

Motown: The Musical is a Broadway musical that launched on April 14, 2013. It is the story of Berry Gordy's creation of Motown Records. Wilson was portrayed by Ariana DeBose in 2013.

As a member of the Supremes, her songs "Stop! In the Name of Love" and "You Can't Hurry Love" are among the Rock and Roll Hall of Fame's 500 Songs that Shaped Rock and Roll. The Ross-Wilson-Ballard lineup was inducted into the Rock and Roll Hall of Fame in 1988 (Video on YouTube), received a star on the Hollywood Walk of Fame in 1994, and entered into the Vocal Group Hall of Fame in 1998. Wilson was the only Supreme present for all three ceremonies. In 2004, Rolling Stone placed the group at number 96 on their list of the "100 Greatest Artists of All Time".

As a member of the Supremes, Wilson was named as one of eight recipients to receive a Grammy Lifetime Achievement Award at the 65th Annual Grammy Awards in 2023.

== Supremes discography ==
=== Singles ===
The Supremes

- 1960: "Tears of Sorrow" (The Primettes)
- 1961: "I Want a Guy"
- 1961: "Buttered Popcorn"
- 1962: "Your Heart Belongs to Me"
- 1962: "Let Me Go the Right Way"
- 1963: "My Heart Can't Take It No More"
- 1963: "A Breathtaking Guy"
- 1963: "When the Lovelight Starts Shining Through His Eyes"
- 1964: "Run, Run, Run"
- 1964: "Where Did Our Love Go"
- 1964: "Baby Love"
- 1964: "Come See About Me"
- 1965: "Stop! In the Name of Love"
- 1965: "Back in My Arms Again"
- 1965: "Nothing but Heartaches"
- 1965: "I Hear a Symphony"
- 1965: "My World Is Empty Without You"
- 1966: "Love Is Like an Itching in My Heart"
- 1966: "You Can't Hurry Love"
- 1966: "You Keep Me Hangin' On"
- 1967: "Love Is Here and Now You're Gone"
- 1967: "The Happening"

Diana Ross & the Supremes

- 1967: "Reflections"
- 1967: "In and Out of Love"
- 1968: "I'm Gonna Make You Love Me"
- 1969: "I'll Try Something New"
- 1969: "The Weight"
- 1969: "I Second That Emotion"
- 1970: "Why (Must We Fall in Love)"

The Supremes

- 1970: "Up the Ladder to the Roof"
- 1970: "Everybody's Got the Right to Love"
- 1970: "Stoned Love"
- 1970: "River Deep – Mountain High"
- 1971: "Nathan Jones"
- 1971: "You Gotta Have Love in Your Heart"
- 1971: "Touch"
- 1971: "Floy Joy"
- 1972: "Automatically Sunshine"
- 1972: "Without the One You Love"
- 1972: "Your Wonderful, Sweet Sweet Love"
- 1972: "I Guess I'll Miss the Man"
- 1972: "Reach Out and Touch (Somebody's Hand)"
- 1973: "Bad Weather"
- 1973: "Tossin' and Turnin'"
- 1975: "He's My Man"
- 1975: "Where Do I Go from Here"
- 1975: "Early Morning Love"
- 1976: "I'm Gonna Let My Heart Do the Walking"
- 1976: "High Energy"
- 1976: "You're My Driving Wheel"
- 1977: "Let Yourself Go"
- 1977: "Love, I Never Knew You Could Feel So Good"

Note: The seven of fourteen Diana Ross & the Supremes 1967–1970 singles Wilson appeared on are listed above. The seven singles she did not appear on are listed below:

- 1968: "Forever Came Today"
- 1968: "Some Things You Never Get Used To"
- 1968: "Love Child"
- 1969: "I'm Livin' in Shame"
- 1969: "The Composer"
- 1969: "No Matter What Sign You Are"
- 1969: "Someday We'll Be Together"

Note: Wilson sang lead on several songs recorded by The Supremes during the group's career and shared lead on 12 songs. Wilson recorded lead vocals to "Send Him to Me" and "If You Let Me Baby" during the Right On sessions which remain unreleased until 2022. Some of Wilson's unreleased lead vocals appeared on several post '77 releases including; "Our Day Will Come" from There's a Place for Us, "Still Water (Love)" from This Is the Story, "Can We Love Again" from The '70s Anthology, "You're What's Missing In My Life" [Mary Wilson Lead Version] also "Mr. Boogie" and "Give Out, But Don't Give Up" [Mary Wilson Lead Version] from Let Yourself Go. The recordings where she had lead vocals are listed below:

- 1960: "Pretty Baby"
- 1961: "The Tears" (unreleased from Meet The Supremes)
- 1962: "Baby Don't Go" (from Meet The Supremes)
- 1965: "Sunset" (co-lead with Diana Ross from The Supremes Sing Country, Western and Pop)
- 1965: "It Makes No Difference Now" (co-lead with Florence Ballard and Diana Ross each singing a solo verse from The Supremes Sing Country, Western and Pop)
- 1966: "Come and Get These Memories" (from The Supremes A' Go-Go)
- 1967/1970: "Falling in Love with Love" (co-lead with Diana Ross from The Supremes Sing Rodgers & Hart; live solo version from Farewell)
- 1968/1987: "The Ballad of Davy Crockett" (unreleased from Diana Ross & the Supremes Sing Disney Classics; later released as a part of The Never-Before-Released Masters compilation)
- 1969/1970/1973: "Can't Take My Eyes Off You" (co-lead with Eddie Kendricks from Together; live solo version from Farewell; The Supremes Live! In Japan)
- 1972: "A Heart Like Mine" (from Floy Joy)
- 1972: "I Keep It Hid" (from The Supremes Produced and Arranged by Jimmy Webb)
- 1975: "Early Morning Love" (from The Supremes)
- 1975: "Where Is It I Belong" (from The Supremes)
- 1975: "You Turn Me Around" (from The Supremes)
- 1976: "Don't Let My Teardrops Bother You" (from High Energy)
- 1976: "Til The Boat Sails Away" (from High Energy)
- 1976: "I Don't Want To Lose You" (from High Energy)
- 1976: "You're What's Missing In My Life" (co-lead with Scherrie Payne from High Energy)
- 1976: "We Should Be Closer Together" (from Mary, Scherrie & Susaye)
- 1976: "You Are The Heart of Me" (from Mary, Scherrie & Susaye)

== Solo discography ==
=== Studio albums ===
- 1979: Mary Wilson
- 1992: Walk the Line
- 2021: Mary Wilson Expanded Edition

=== Extended Plays ===
- 2021: Mary Wilson: Red Hot Eric Kupper Remix EP
- 2022: Mary Wilson: Celebrating Pride

=== Compilation albums ===
- 2000: I Am Changing
- 2022: Mary Wilson: The Motown Anthology

=== Live album ===
- 2008: Up Close: Live from San Francisco

=== DVDs ===
- 2006: Live at the Sands
- 2009: Up Close: Live from San Francisco

=== Album guest appearances ===
- with Neil Sedaka on Come See About Me (one song) – "Come See About Me"
- with Paul Jabara on De La Noche Sisters (one song) – "This Girl's Back"
- with Turtle Creek Chorale, The Women's Chorus Of Dallas and Brant Adams on the album Sing For The Cure, Vol 1 (one song) – "Come to Me, Mother"
- with the Four Tops on From the Heart (2006) (one song) – "River Deep – Mountain High"
- with Human Nature on Get Ready (2007) (two songs) – "River Deep – Mountain High" and "It Takes Two"
- with Ernie Couch & Revival on Christmas Time (2009) – "Go Tell It on the Mountain"

=== Singles ===
List of singles, as lead and featured artist, with selected chart positions
A-side title	Year	Peak chart positions		Album
A-side title	Year	US R&B /HH	US Dance	Album
"Red Hot"	1979	95	85	Mary Wilson
"Midnight Dancer"	1979	—	—	Mary Wilson
"Pick Up the Pieces" (UK only)	1980	—	—	Mary Wilson
"You're the Light That Guides My Way" (UK only)	1980	—	—	Mary Wilson
"Don't Get Mad, Get Even"	1987	—	—	Non-album single
"Oooh Child"	1989	—	—	Non-album single
"One Night with You"	1991	—	—	Walk the Line
"Walk the Line"	1992	—	—	Walk the Line
"U"	1995	—	—	Non-album single
"Turn Around"	1996	—	—	Non-album single
"Life's Been Good to Be"	2011	—	—	Non-album single
"Darling Mother (Johnnie Mae)"	2013	—	—	Non-album single
"Time to Move On" (Sweet Feet Music Presents Mary Wilson)	2015	—	17	Non-album single
"Why Can't We All Get Along"	2021	—	—	Non-album single
"Red Hot (The Eric Kupper Remix)"	2021	—	—	Red Hot: The Eric Kupper Remix EP
"Soul Defender" (Sweet Feet Music Presents Mary Wilson)	2023	—	—	Non-album single
"—" denotes the single failed to chart or was not released

Motown releases

- 1979: "Red Hot" / "Midnight Dancer"
- 1980: "Pick Up the Pieces" / "You're the Light That Guides My Way" (UK only)

Nightmare/Motorcity releases

- 1987: "Don't Get Mad, Get Even" – Nightmare Records
- 1989: "Oooh Child" – Nightmare Records

CEO releases

- 1992: "One Night With You"
- 1992: "Walk the Line"

Other releases

- 1980: Gus Dudgeon produced four master tracks for Motown; released as part of the 2021 Mary Wilson: Expanded Edition:

"Love Talk" / "Save Me" / "You Danced My Heart Around the Stars" / "Green River"

- 1995: "U" R&B Mix with Groov-E – Contract Recording Company
- 1996: "Turn Around" – Da Bridge Records
- 1996: "A Little Bit of Love" (with Clas Yngström on guitar) – Boderline Records
- 1996: "Ships in the Night" (with Clas Yngström on guitar) – Boderline Records
- 2000: "Got to Keep Movin'"
- 2011: "Life's Been Good to Me" – Motor City Works
- 2013: "Darling Mother (Johnnie Mae)" – Motor City Works
- 2015: "Time to Move On"
- 2021: "Why Can't We All Get Along" (posthumous)

Unreleased

- 1986: "My Love Life is a Disaster" (unreleased demo)
- 1987: "Sleeping in Separate Rooms" – Atlantic Records
- 1987: "Stronger in a Broken Part" – Atlantic Records
- 1987: "The One I Love" – Atlantic Records
- "Can We Talk About It"
- "Show Me"
- "Love Child" (out-take from Walk the Line album)

== DVD appearances ==
- T.A.M.I. Show – performer, with the Supremes (1964)
- Beach Ball – performer, with the Supremes (1965)
- Motown 25: Yesterday, Today, Forever – performer, with the Supremes (1983)
- Girl Groups: The Story of a Sound – herself (1994)
- Jeff Barry & Friends – Chapel of Love (2000)
- Jackie's Back (movie) – Vesta Crotchley (2002)
- Rhythm, Love and Soul – herself (2003)
- Tiger Town (movie) – National Anthem singer (2004)
- Only the Strong Survive – performer (2004)
- From the Heart: The Four Tops – 50th Anniversary Concert – performer (2005)
- Live at the Sands – herself (2006)
- Greatest Hits: Live in Amsterdam – performer, with the Supremes (2006)
- Reflections: The Definitive Performances (1964–1969) – singer (2006)
- Mary Wilson; Up Close: Live from San Francisco (2010)
- Golden Shoes (movie) - Mrs. Donna King (2015)

== Other notable appearances ==
- Soul Train – Guest star with The Supremes; danced down "the Soul Train line" with Don Cornelius (May 12, 1973) "Soul Train" The Supremes/Lloyd Price (TV Episode 1973) ⭐ 8.0 | Music, Talk-Show
- The Scene – Guest star/dancer (1982)
- 227 – Guest star; season 3/episode 8 (November 21, 1987)
- Brenda Russell: "Walkin' in New York" – cameo in music video
- Motown 40: The Music is Forever – herself (1998)
- Motown 45 – performer (2004)
- Motown: The Early Years: PBS Special (2005)
- My Music: Motown Memories: PBS Special – hostess (2009)
- Unsung: Florence Ballard – interviewee (2009)
- "RuPaul's Drag Race All Stars" - guest judge (2012)
- Unsung: The Marvelettes - interviewee (2012)
- Unsung: Eddie Kendricks – interviewee (2013)
- 60's Girl Grooves: PBS Special – hostess (2013)
- Dancing with the Stars – contestant on season 28 (2019)

== Bibliography ==
- Benjaminson, Peter (2009). The Lost Supreme: The Life of Dreamgirl Florence Ballard. Chicago Review Press. ISBN 978-1-556-52959-7.
- Wilson, Mary (1986). Dreamgirl: My Life as a Supreme. New York: St. Martin's Press. ISBN 0-312-21959-8.
- Wilson, Mary; Romanowski, Patricia (1990). Supreme Faith: Someday We'll Be Together. New York: HarperCollins. ISBN 0-06-016290-2.
- Wilson, Mary (1999). Dreamgirl & Supreme Faith: My Life as a Supreme. New York: Cooper Square Press. ISBN 0-8154-1000-X.
- Wilson, Mary; Bego, Mark (2019). Supreme Glamour. New York: Thames & Hudson. ISBN 978-0-500-02200-9.
