= Dreamgirl: My Life as a Supreme =

1986 autobiography of Mary Wilson

- Author: Mary Wilson
- Language: English
- Genre: Autobiography, memoir
- Publisher: St. Martin's Press
- Publication date: 1986
- Publication place: United States
- Pages: 292
- ISBN: 978-0-312-21959-8
- OCLC: 473046638
- LC Class: ML420.W553 A3
- Followed by: Supreme Faith: Someday We'll Be Together

Dreamgirl: My Life as a Supreme is a 1986 autobiography that features the memoirs of Mary Wilson, one of the founding members of Motown singing trio The Supremes. It was a New York Times Best Seller for months, and remains one of the best-selling rock-and-roll autobiographies of all time. The project was originally called "Reflections: My Life as a Supreme" honoring their 1967 hit single, but the title of the book changed before first release to reference Dreamgirls, a 1981 Broadway musical loosely based on the lives and careers of the Supremes. Dreamgirl covers the Diana Ross-led years of the group. In 1990 Wilson penned a follow-up entitled Supreme Faith: Someday We'll Be Together that covers Wilson's life since 1970. Both books and a new afterword were included in a combined volume titled Dreamgirl & Supreme Faith: My Life as a Supreme in 2000.

== History ==
The book covers the story of Wilson's life from her childhood, to meeting Florence Ballard and Diana Ross and forming the Primettes (later The Supremes), to the group's later international success and personal conflicts in the 1960s, Ballard's replacement with Cindy Birdsong in 1967, the development of Ross as a solo act, and Ross' split from the group in 1969–1970. Dreamgirl was dedicated to Wilson's family and "to the memory of Florence 'Blondie' Ballard", whose post-Supremes years are also covered in the book.

According to J. Randy Taraborrelli's 2007 biography, Diana Ross – A Biography, Wilson approached Ross in 1986 to discuss the book; however, Ross reportedly snubbed Wilson upon learning that the book presented her in a negative light. Because the book contained much unknown information about Ross' alleged diva-ish behavior onstage and off, some people jokingly referred to the book as "Diana Dearest" (this name was inspired by Christina Crawford's memoir Mommie Dearest).

In 1990, Supreme Faith: Someday We'll Be Together, co-authored by Patricia Romanowski, was released. It covers The "New Supremes"-era of the 1970s in which Wilson was the only remaining original Supreme left in the girl group. The "New Supremes" period included Wilson and Birdsong from the 1960s, and new additions to the lineup, including Jean Terrell, Lynda Laurence, Scherrie Payne, and Susaye Greene. The book also covers Wilson's marriage and divorce to Pedro Ferrer, the births of her three children, and her solo career in the 1980s.

In January 2000, the two books were released together as Dreamgirl & Supreme Faith: My Life as a Supreme, and included an afterword which covered Wilson's life during the 1990s, including her unsuccessful legal battle for the Supremes trademark and the tragic death of her youngest son.

== Versions ==
- Wilson, Mary (1986). Dreamgirl: My Life as a Supreme. New York: St. Martin's Press.
- Wilson, Mary and Romanowski, Patricia (1990). Supreme Faith: Someday We'll Be Together. New York: HarperCollins. ISBN 0-06-016290-2
- Wilson, Mary and Romanowski, Patricia (1986, 1990, 1999). Dreamgirl & Supreme Faith: My Life as a Supreme. New York: Cooper Square Publishers. ISBN 0-8154-1000-X.
