= I'm Livin' in Shame =

- Solid center variant of the UK single

Single by Diana Ross & the Supremes

from the album Let the Sunshine In
- B-side: "I'm So Glad I Got Somebody (Like You Around)"
- Released: January 6, 1969
- Genre: Psychedelic pop, psychedelic soul
- Length: 2:57
- Label: Motown; M 1139
- Songwriters: Frank Wilson, Pam Sawyer, R. Dean Taylor, Deke Richards
- Producers: The Clan (R. Dean Taylor, Frank Wilson, Pam Sawyer, Deke Richards)

Diana Ross & the Supremes singles chronology
"I'm Gonna Make You Love Me" (1968)	"I'm Livin' in Shame" (1969)	"I'll Try Something New" (1969)

"I'm Livin' in Shame" is a 1969 song released for Diana Ross & the Supremes on the Motown label. The sequel to the Supremes' number-one hit, "Love Child," the song peaked in the top ten on the US Billboard Hot 100 pop chart at #10 and the top 20 in the UK at #14 in April and May 1969.

== Background and release ==
Inspired by the plot of Douglas Sirk's 1959 film Imitation of Life, The Clan composed "I'm Livin' in Shame" as a sequel to the Supremes' number-one hit single, "Love Child." The song explores the quest of the 'love child' to shun both her impoverished childhood and her mother, and pass herself off to her friends and new husband as the daughter of a rich family. The woman's mother ends up dying without ever seeing her daughter as an adult, or ever meeting her two-year-old grandson, to the child's regret and chagrin.

The girl group debuted the single live on the Sunday, January 5, 1969 episode of the popular CBS variety program, The Ed Sullivan Show, peaking at number 10 on the American pop chart and at 14 on the UK singles chart in late winter and early spring of 1969. The recorded release is without the backing vocals of Mary Wilson or Cindy Birdsong (as with many singles released under this group's billing, session singers The Andantes appear on the record).

Cash Box described it as a "spectacular performance and another standout song" that continues the story of the Supremes earlier single "Love Child."

== Personnel ==
- Lead vocals by Diana Ross
- Background vocals by the Andantes: Jackie Hicks, Marlene Barrow, and Louvain Demps
- Instrumentation by the Funk Brothers

== Track listing ==
- 7" single (6 January 1969) (North America/United Kingdom/Netherlands)
1. "I'm Livin' in Shame" – 2:57
2. "I'm So Glad I Got Somebody (Like You Around)" – 2:58

== Charts ==
Chart (1969)	Peak position
Australia (Go-Set)	28
Australia (Kent Music Report)	33
Canada Top Singles (RPM)	12
Iceland (Íslenski Listinn)	27
Ireland (IRMA)	6
Netherlands (Dutch Top 40 Tipparade)	3
UK Singles (Official Charts)	14
UK R&B (Record Mirror)	9
US Billboard Hot 100	10
US Hot R&B/Hip-Hop Songs (Billboard)	8
US Cashbox Top 100	8
US Cashbox R&B	8
US Record World 100 Top Pops	8
US Record World Top 50 R&B	7

== Cover Versions ==
In 1981, singer Clem Easterling released a cover of "Living In Shame" from her "Just in Time" LP.
