= Someday We'll Be Together =

1969 single by Diana Ross and the Supremes

Single by Johnny & Jackey
- Released: November 1961
- Recorded: 1961
- Genre: Doo-wop, rhythm and blues
- Length: 3:34
- Label: Tri-Phi; 1005
- Songwriters: Johnny Bristol; Jackey Beavers; Harvey Fuqua
- Producer: Harvey Fuqua

Johnny & Jackey singles chronology
"Carry Your Own Load" (1961)	"Someday We'll Be Together" (1961)	"Do You See My Love (For You Growing)" (1962)

"Someday We'll Be Together" is a song written by Johnny Bristol, Jackey Beavers, and Harvey Fuqua. It was the last of twelve American number-one pop singles for Diana Ross & the Supremes on the Motown label. Although it was released as the final Supremes song featuring Diana Ross, who left the group for a solo career in January 1970, it was recorded as Ross' first solo single and Supremes members Mary Wilson and Cindy Birdsong do not sing on the recording. Both appear on the B-side, "He's My Sunny Boy".

The single topped the Billboard Hot 100 pop singles chart for one week, in the final 1969 issue of Billboard magazine (dated December 27). It would be the last number one hit of the 1960s.

== Background ==
=== Original version ===
The song was written by Johnny Bristol, Jackey Beavers, and Harvey Fuqua in 1961; Bristol and Beavers recorded the song together as "Johnny & Jackey" for the Tri-Phi label that same year. "Someday" was a moderate success in the Midwestern United States, but gained little notice in other venues.

Tri-Phi was purchased by Motown in the mid-1960s. Fuqua, Bristol, and Beavers all joined Berry Gordy's by-then famous record company, and "Someday We'll Be Together" became part of Motown's Jobete publishing catalog. Beavers soon departed for Chess Records, although both Bristol and Fuqua stayed on as songwriters and producers for Motown.

=== Supremes version ===
"Someday We'll Be Together"
- Solid center variant of the UK single

Single by Diana Ross & the Supremes

from the album Cream of the Crop
- B-side: "He's My Sunny Boy"
- Released: October 14, 1969
- Recorded: Hitsville U.S.A. (Studio A); June 13, 1969 + additional dates
- Genre: Pop, soul
- Length: 3:25 (album/single version); 3:34 (2003 remix)
- Label: Motown; M 1156
- Songwriters: Johnny Bristol; Jackey Beavers; Harvey Fuqua
- Producer: Johnny Bristol

Diana Ross & the Supremes singles chronology
"I Second That Emotion" (1969)	"Someday We'll Be Together" (1969)	"Up the Ladder to the Roof" (1970)

Audio sample
- "Someday We'll Be Together": file; help

In 1969, Bristol was preparing a new version of "Someday We'll Be Together", to be recorded by Motown act Jr. Walker & the All-Stars. Bristol had already recorded the instrumental track and the background vocals when Berry Gordy happened upon the tracks and heard them. Gordy thought that "Someday" would be a perfect first solo single for Diana Ross, who was making her long-expected exit from the Supremes at the time, and had Bristol sequester Ross into the studio to record the song.

Unable at first to get the vocal performance he desired from Ross, Johnny Bristol decided to try something different: he would harmonize with her, helping Ross to get into the mood needed for the record. On the first take, the engineer accidentally recorded both Ross's vocal and Bristol's ad-libs. Bristol and arranger Wade Marcus liked the results, and Bristol had his vocal recorded alongside Ross' for the final version of the song. Bristol's ad-libs and words of encouragement to Ross can be heard in the background throughout the song. When Berry Gordy heard the completed song, he decided to release it as the final Diana Ross & the Supremes song. Neither of the Supremes' remaining members, however, sang on the record. Ross's first solo single instead, released in early 1970, became "Reach Out and Touch (Somebody's Hand)".

Even though the implicit subject of the song was that of Ross comforting a long-distance lover, "Someday We'll Be Together" allowed for other interpretations, one being that Ross and bandmates Mary Wilson and Cindy Birdsong would one day nostalgically "be together" again. Further, in concert, Ross would suggest that "someday, we'll be together" in regard to contemporary troubles such as civil rights and the ongoing demonstrations and protests against the Vietnam War.

==== Release ====
"Someday We'll Be Together" was included on the final Diana Ross & the Supremes album, Cream of the Crop (1969). The song was a United States number-one hit on both the Billboard Hot 100 popular singles chart and the R&B singles chart, as well as charting in the top twenty at number 13 on the UK Singles Chart. It also peaked on the Netherlands' MegaCharts at #19 in 1970. "Someday's" B-side, "He's My Sunny Boy", was recorded by Ross, Wilson, and Birdsong for the Love Child album in 1968 and written and produced by Smokey Robinson.

"Someday" charted at number-one on the Billboard Hot 100 popular singles chart for one week, on December 27, 1969. It also charted at number-one on the Billboard R&B Singles chart for four weeks, from December 13, 1969, to January 3, 1970. "Someday We'll Be Together" therefore appeared in Billboard as both the final Hot 100 and R&B number-one of the 1960s, and as the first R&B number-one of the 1970s.

==== Notable live performances ====
The girl group made their final of several performances throughout the decade with Diana Ross singing lead on the 1960s decennial finale of The Ed Sullivan Show that aired live Sunday, December 21, 1969, on CBS.

"Someday We'll Be Together" was the final number at Diana Ross & the Supremes' farewell concert on January 14, 1970, at the Frontier Hotel in Las Vegas. After the completion of the show, Jean Terrell was presented onstage to the audience as Diana Ross' replacement (alongside Wilson and Birdsong). Thus "Diana Ross & the Supremes" officially split apart, becoming "Diana Ross" (the solo act) and "The Supremes" (the group).

Ross reunited with Wilson and Birdsong in 1983, performing the single for the Motown 25: Yesterday, Today, Forever television special. However, this long anticipated performance was cut short mostly owing to lack of rehearsal after more than a decade of the group being apart. There is much speculation regarding the onstage exchange that took place between Ross and Wilson, but some audience members report it resulted in Ross shoving Wilson during the on-stage performance. A heavily edited version of this performance was aired on national television and released on the DVD of Motown 25.

=== Other versions ===
"Someday We'll Be Together"

Single by Bill Anderson and Jan Howard

from the album Bill and Jan (Or Jan and Bill)
- Released: June 1970
- Recorded: 1969
- Genre: Country
- Label: Decca Records; 32689
- Songwriters: Johnny Bristol; Jackey Beavers; Harvey Fuqua
- Producer: Owen Bradley

Bill Anderson singles chronology
"Love Is a Sometimes Thing" (1970)	"Someday We'll Be Together" (1970)	"Where Have All Our Heroes Gone" (1970)

Jan Howard singles chronology
"Rock Me Back to Little Rock" (1970)	"Someday We'll Be Together" (1970)	"The Soul You Never Had" (1970)

"Someday We'll Be Together"

Single by Diana Ross

from the album Diana Extended
- Released: April 9, 1994
- Recorded: 1994
- Genre: Soul, Pop, Dance
- Length: 3:04 (Radio Edit); 8:42 (Album Version)
- Label: Motown Records
- Songwriters: Johnny Bristol; Jackey Beavers; Harvey Fuqua
- Producer: Frankie Knuckles (Remixer)

Diana Ross singles chronology
"The Best Years of My Life" (1993)	"Someday We'll Be Together" (1994)	"Take Me Higher" (1995)

- Country singers Bill Anderson and Jan Howard recorded a version for the country music market. Their version peaked at #4 on Billboard magazine's Hot Country Singles chart in the summer of 1970.
- Another version, credited to the "already-defunct" group (and fellow Motown act) The Marvelettes, was released in 1970 as well, as a track to the group's final album The Return of the Marvelettes. As with the Supremes version, lead vocalist Wanda Young Rogers was the only group member to sing on the track, with The Andantes used as backing vocalists.
- During her official live solo debut nightclub performance in summer 1979 in New York City, fellow former Supreme Mary Wilson stopped at audience member Diana Ross’s table and sang a few bars of their last group hit together, much to the rest of the audience’s delight.
- In 1994, singer Diana Ross released a remixed version by legendary DJ Frankie Knuckles. This single peaked at #7 on the Billboard Hot Dance Club Songs.
- Amber Riley sang the song in 2015 for Glee's final episode "Dreams Come True".
- Singer-songwriter Bruce Springsteen recorded a cover version of the song for his 2022 studio album, Only the Strong Survive.
- Other versions include those by orchestra leader Bert Kaempfert (as a single in 1970), country singer Lorrie Morgan (as a single in 1983), Scottish pop singer Jimmy Somerville (on Dare to Love, 1995), and rock artist Vonda Shepard (on Heart and Soul: New Songs from Ally McBeal, 1999).

== Personnel ==
=== Johnny & Jackey version ===
- Vocals by Johnny Bristol and Jackey Beavers
- Instrumentation by various

=== Diana Ross & the Supremes version ===
- Lead vocals by Diana Ross
- Background vocals by Merry Clayton, Julia Waters Tillman, and Maxine Waters Willard
- Male backing vocals by Johnny Bristol
- Instrumentation by the Funk Brothers and the Detroit Symphony Orchestra
- Arranged by Wade Marcus

=== Bill Anderson and Jan Howard version ===
- Vocals by Bill Anderson and Jan Howard
- Instrumentation by various instrumentalists

=== The Marvelettes version ===
- Lead vocals by Wanda Young Rogers
- Background vocals by the Andantes: Jackie Hicks, Marlene Barrow, and Louvain Demps
- Instrumentation by the Funk Brothers and the Detroit Symphony Orchestra

== Track listing ==
=== Supremes version ===
- 7" single (14 October 1969) (North America/United Kingdom)
1. "Someday We'll Be Together" – 3:14
2. "He's My Sunny Boy" – 2:18

== Charts ==
=== Supremes version ===
==== Weekly charts ====
Chart (1969–1970)	Peak position
Australia (Go-Set)	35
Australia (Kent Music Report)	52
Canada Top Singles (RPM)	4
Iceland (Íslenski Listinn)	3
Netherlands (Dutch Top 40)	20
Netherlands (Single Top 100)	19
South Africa (Springbok Radio)	5
UK Singles (Official Charts)	13
UK R&B (Record Mirror)	1
US Billboard Hot 100	1
US Adult Contemporary (Billboard)	12
US Hot R&B/Hip-Hop Songs (Billboard)	1
US Cash Box Top 100	1
US R&B (Cash Box)	1
US Record World 100 Top Pops	2
US Record World Top 50 R&B	1
Yugoslavia (Billboard)	9
Chart (1994)	Peak position
US Dance Club Songs (Billboard) Frankie Knuckles remix	7

==== Year-end charts ====
Chart (1970)	Rank
Canada Top Singles (RPM)	86
US R&B (Cash Box)	2

== Certifications ==
Certifications for "Someday We'll Be Together", Supremes version
Region	Certification	Certified units/sales
New Zealand (RMNZ)	Gold	15,000^{‡}
United States (RIAA)	Platinum	2,000,000
Summaries
Worldwide	—	3,000,000
^{‡} Sales+streaming figures based on certification alone.

== See also ==
- List of Hot 100 number-one singles of 1969 (U.S.)
- List of number-one R&B singles of 1969 (U.S.)
- List of number-one R&B singles of 1970 (U.S.)

== Bibliography ==
- Posner, Gerald (2002). Motown : Music, Money, Sex, and Power. New York: Random House. ISBN 0-375-50062-6.
- Wilson, Mary and Romanowski, Patricia (1986, 1990, 2000). Dreamgirl & Supreme Faith: My Life as a Supreme. New York: Cooper Square Publishers. ISBN 0-8154-1000-X.
- Whitburn, Joel, "Top Country Songs: 1944-2005", 2006.
