= There's Gonna Be a Storm: The Complete Recordings 1966–1969 =

1992 compilation album by The Left Banke

Compilation album by the Left Banke
- Released: 1992
- Recorded: 1966–1969
- Genre: Baroque pop
- Length: 74:08
- Label: Mercury

The Left Banke chronology
Strangers on a Train (1986)	There's Gonna Be a Storm: The Complete Recordings 1966–1969 (1992)

Professional ratings
Review scores
Source	Rating
AllMusic	4.5/5 stars

There's Gonna Be a Storm: The Complete Recordings 1966–1969 is a compilation album by American baroque pop band the Left Banke, released by Mercury Records in 1992. It contains the entirety of the band's two 1960s albums Walk Away Renée/Pretty Ballerina and The Left Banke Too, with an additional four tracks having appeared on singles only, and one previously unreleased track, "Men Are Building Sand". It is currently out of print. The band enjoyed cult status in the 1990s and beyond as a definitive example of mid-1960s baroque pop.

== Track listing ==
No.	Title	Writer(s)	Length
1.	"Walk Away Renée"	Michael Brown, Tony Sansone, Bob Calilli	2:40
2.	"I Haven't Got the Nerve"	George Cameron, Steve Martin Caro	2:13
3.	"Pretty Ballerina"	Brown	2:32
4.	"She May Call You Up Tonight"	Brown, Martin-Caro	2:18
5.	"I've Got Something on My Mind"	Brown, Martin-Caro, Cameron	2:46
6.	"Barterers and Their Wives"	Brown, Tom Feher	2:56
7.	"Let Go of You Girl"	Brown, Martin-Caro, Cameron	2:53
8.	"What Do You Know"	Brown, Feher	2:57
9.	"Evening Gown"	Brown, Feher	1:46
10.	"Lazy Day"	Brown, Martin-Caro	2:24
11.	"Shadows Breaking Over My Head"	Brown, Martin-Caro	2:34
12.	"Ivy Ivy" (Smash single 2089)	Brown, Feher	3:11
13.	"Men Are Building Sand" (previously unreleased)	Brown, Bert Sommer	2:19
14.	"Desirée"	Brown, Feher	2:42
15.	"Dark is the Bark"	Cameron, Finn, Martin-Caro	3:28
16.	"My Friend Today"	Feher	3:03
17.	"Sing Little Bird Sing"	Tom Finn	3:09
18.	"And Suddenly" (Smash single 2089b)	Brown, Bert Sommer	2:05
19.	"Goodbye Holly"	Feher	2:56
20.	"In the Morning Light"	Brown, Feher	2:50
21.	"Bryant Hotel"	Feher	3:24
22.	"Give the Man a Hand"	Marvin Potocki	2:33
23.	"Nice to See You"	Finn	2:41
24.	"There's Gonna Be a Storm"	Finn	4:16
25.	"Pedestal" (Smash single 2243)	Tom Kaye, Marty Joe Kupersmith	3:45
26.	"Myrah" (Smash single 2243b)	Brown, Martin-Caro	3:21

Tracks 1–11 are taken from the Walk Away Renée/Pretty Ballerina album, while tracks 14–17 and 19–24 are taken from The Left Banke Too.

== Personnel ==
- Steve Martin Caro – lead vocals; drums (on "Goodbye Holly"), tambourine (on "Nice To See You"), bass (on "Bryant Hotel")
- Michael Brown – piano, harpsichord, Clavinet, organ; lead vocals (on "What Do You Know")
- Tom Finn – bass, guitar, backing vocals; lead vocals (on "Nice to See You" & "There's Gonna Be A Storm")
- George Cameron – drums, percussion, backing vocals; lead vocals (on "I Haven't Got The Nerve", "Goodbye Holly" & "Bryant Hotel")
- Warren David-Schierhorst – drums
- Jeff Winfield – electric guitar
- Rick Brand – electric guitar, banjo
- Bert Sommer – lead vocals/guitar (on "Ivy, Ivy", "And Suddenly" & "Men Are Building Sand")
- Michael McKean – guitar (on "Ivy, Ivy", "And Suddenly" & "Men Are Building Sand")
- Tom Feher – piano; guitar (on "Sing Little Bird" & "Bryant Hotel")

Additional personnel

- Steve Tallarico – backing vocals
- Paul Griffin – keyboards
- Paul Leka – piano, string arrangements
- Hugh McCracken – guitar
- Al Gorgoni – guitar
- George "Fluffer" Hirsh – guitar
- Marvin Potocki – guitars
- John Abbott – bass, guitar, string and horn arrangements
- Seymour Barab – bass, cello
- Joe Mack – bass
- Chet Amsterdam – bass
- Al Rogers – drums
- Buddy Saltzman – drums
- Bobby Gregg – drums
- Artie Schroek – vibraphone, drums, string arrangements
- Paul Leka – string arrangements
- Harry Lookofsky – violin
- George Marge – oboe
- Ray Alonge – french horn
- Marvin Stamm – trumpet
- George Young – woodwinds
