= Strangers on a Train (album) =

1986 album by The Left Banke

Studio album by the Left Banke
- Released: March 1986
- Recorded: February – April 1978; May – August 1978
- Studios: Kingdom Sound Studios, Long Island, New York City; RCA Studios, New York City
- Genres: Pop, rock
- Length: 35:30
- Label: Relix Records (RRLP 2021)
- Producers: Joe Ferla, Camerica Productions

The Left Banke chronology
The Left Banke Too (1968)	Strangers on a Train (1986)	There's Gonna Be a Storm: The Complete Recordings 1966–1969 (1992)

Singles from Strangers on a Train
- 1. "Queen of Paradise" b/w "And One Day" Released: 1978 (Camerica CS 0005)

Alternate European cover
- Cover of the European Voices Calling LP

Professional ratings
Review scores
Source	Rating
AllMusic	3/5 stars
Goldmine Magazine	A−
PopMatters	7/10

Strangers on a Train (also known as Voices Calling) is the third and final studio album by American baroque pop band the Left Banke and was released in March 1986.

== Recording ==
Strangers on a Train was recorded in 1978 by a reformed line-up of the Left Banke, featuring three of the original members: Steve Martin, Tom Finn, and George Cameron. Original member Michael Brown had initially been involved in the recording, but left after working on five of the songs. Although Brown played piano and mellotron during the sessions he is not credited on the album, either as a writer or musician. Recording engineer/producer Les Fradkin was also involved with the same recording sessions that featured Brown. He recalls contributing bass, mellotron, slide guitar and vocals, but like Brown, he is not credited on the album.

Although they were pleased with the songs on Strangers on a Train, Finn and Cameron were both ultimately dissatisfied with the finished record. Finn has described it as being largely a demo recording, with only two or three of the songs being properly produced.

Two songs that were recorded during the album sessions, but didn't make the final track listing, were titled "Poor Boy" and "Right by My Side". The songs "Queen of Paradise" and "And One Day" were released together as a single in late 1978, but failed to chart. The single's lack of success resulted in the album being shelved and the reformed band broke up again shortly afterwards.

== Release ==
Although Strangers on a Train was recorded in 1978, it wasn't released until eight years later in 1986. The album was issued in the U.S. by the West Coast rock and Grateful Dead specialist label, Relix Records. The cover art for the album was produced by Gary Kroman, from a concept by Leslie D. Kipple.

In Europe, Bam-Caruso Records released the album with a rearranged running order, under the alternate title of Voices Calling.

An unauthorized compilation of Voices Calling was issued by Red Cap Records in 2004, compiling the album with the Michael Brown produced Montage LP, Steve Martin's lone solo single, and some Left Banke radio spots.

Omnivore Recordings issued an expanded and remastered CD of the album on February 25, 2022. The Omnivore reissue compiles the UK Bam-Caruso sequence of album, with 6 previously unissued songs recorded with Brown in 2001-2002 (all were written by Brown, one in collaboration with Yvonne Vitale and one with Ian Lloyd). The remaster was co-produced by Grammy winning producer Cheryl Pawelski, rock photographer Daniel Coston, and author Scott Schinder.

== Track listing ==
=== Strangers on a Train ===
==== Side 1 ====
1. "Hold on Tight" (Tom Finn) – 2:45
2. "Heartbreaker" (Tom Finn, Steve Martin) – 3:29
3. "Lorraine" (Tom Finn) – 3:03
4. "You Say" (Tom Finn, Steve Martin, George Cameron) – 2:51
5. "And One Day" (Tom Finn, Steve Martin, George Cameron) – 3:22

==== Side 2 ====
1. "Queen of Paradise" (Shade Smith) – 2:57
2. "Only My Opinion" (Tom Finn) – 4:30
3. "Strangers on a Train" (Tom Finn) – 4:20
4. "I Can Fly" (Tom Finn) – 4:10
5. "Yesterday's Love" (Tom Finn, Steve Martin, George Cameron) – 3:50

=== Voices Calling ===
==== Side 1 ====
1. "Strangers on a Train" (Tom Finn) – 4:20
2. "Heartbreaker" (Tom Finn, Steve Martin) – 3:29
3. "Lorraine" (Tom Finn) – 3:03
4. "Yesterday's Love" (Tom Finn, Steve Martin, George Cameron) – 3:50
5. "Hold on Tight" (Tom Finn) – 2:45

==== Side 2 ====
1. "And One Day" (Tom Finn, Steve Martin, George Cameron) – 3:22
2. "You Say" (Tom Finn, Steve Martin, George Cameron) – 2:51
3. "I Can Fly" (Tom Finn) – 4:10
4. "Only My Opinion" (Tom Finn) – 4:30
5. "Queen of Paradise" (Shade Smith) – 2:57

=== Strangers On A Train (Omnivore Recordings) ===
1. "Strangers on a Train" (Tom Finn) – 4:23
2. "Heartbreaker" (Tom Finn, Steve Martin) – 3:30
3. "Lorraine" (Tom Finn) – 3:05
4. "Yesterday's Love" (Tom Finn, Steve Martin, George Cameron) – 3:54
5. "Hold on Tight" (Tom Finn) – 2:48
6. "And One Day" (Tom Finn, Steve Martin, George Cameron) – 3:22
7. "You Say" (Tom Finn, Steve Martin, George Cameron) – 2:50
8. "I Can Fly" (Tom Finn) – 4:12
9. "Only My Opinion" (Tom Finn) – 4:33
10. "Queen of Paradise" (Shade Smith) – 3:00
11. "Airborne" (Michael Brown) – 3:21
12. "I Don't Know" (Michael Brown) – 2:56
13. "Until The End" (Michael Brown, Yvonne Vitale) – 3:38
14. "Buddy Steve (Long Lost Friend)" (Michael Brown) – 4:28
15. "Meet Me In The Moonlight" (Michael Brown) – 3:13
16. "High Flyer" (Ian Lloyd, Michael Brown) – 3:08

== Personnel ==
Adapted from the liner notes.

- Steve Martin – vocals, guitar
- Tom Finn – bass, guitar, vocals
- George Cameron – drums, vocals

Additional personnel

- Charly Cazalet – bass (on seven songs)
- Michael Brown – keyboards, strings (CD tracks 11–16)
- Jimmy McAllister – guitar (CD tracks 11–16)
- Jon Ihle – drums (CD tracks 11–16)
