= Buddy Saltzman =

American session drummer (1924–2012)

Buddy Saltzman (born Hilliard Saltzman; October 17, 1924 – April 30, 2012) was an American session drummer who played on many hit songs during the 1950s, 1960s, and 1970s.

He is especially remembered for his work with The Four Seasons. On "Dawn (Go Away)" (1964) Saltzman accented the recording with bombastic around-the-kit fills and ghost notes while never using a cymbal once.

He was born in Bridgeton, New Jersey. He died in 2012 at the age of 87.

== Selected singles discography ==
Year	Song title	Artist	Recording date	US charts	R&B charts	British charts	Producer	Miscellaneous
1964	"Dawn (Go Away)"	The Four Seasons	January	3			Bob Crewe	
1964	"Rag Doll"	The Four Seasons		1		2	Bob Crewe	
1964	"The Loco-Motion"	Little Eva	1964	1	1	2	Gerry Goffin	Gary Chester is also listed as the drummer. Often sessions used two drummers
1965	"Society's Child"	Janis Ian	August 3	14			Shadow Morton	not released until late 1966
1965	"Lightnin' Strikes"	Lou Christie	September 3	1		11	Charles Calello	
1966	"I've Got You Under My Skin"	The Four Seasons		9		12	Bob Crewe	written by Cole Porter in 1936
1966	"I'm a Believer"	The Monkees	October; 15 & 23	1		1	Jeff Barry	Gary Chester is also listed as the drummer. Often sessions used two drummers
1966	"Pretty Ballerina"	Left Banke	1966				Harry Lookofsky, Steve Jerome, Bill Jerome	
1967	"The Rain, the Park & Other Things"	The Cowsills		2			Artie Kornfeld	
1971	"Brand New Key"	Melanie	1971	1		4	Peter Schekeryk	

== Selected albums discography ==
Year	Album title	Artist	Recording date	US charts	British charts	Producer	Miscellaneous
1966	Tim Hardin 1	Tim Hardin	May & November 1964; December 1965			Erik Jacobsen	
1966	Walk Away Renée/Pretty Ballerina	Left Banke	1965	67		Harry Lookofsky	
1966	The Peter, Paul and Mary Album	Peter, Paul and Mary		22		Albert Grossman	
1968	Playback	The Appletree Theatre	1967			Peter Spargo	
1968	Take a Picture (album)	Margo Guryan				John Hill, John Simon, David Rosner	
1968	Eli and the Thirteenth Confession	Laura Nyro	1968	181		Laura Nyro, Charlie Calello	
1971	The Good Book	Melanie		80	9	Peter Schekeryk	
1971	Gather Me	Melanie		15	9	Peter Schekeryk	
1992	There's Gonna Be a Storm: The Complete Recordings 1966–1969	The Left Banke	1966-1969				
1994	Hang On to a Dream: The Verve Recordings	Tim Hardin	1964-1966				
