= Walk Away Renée/Pretty Ballerina =

1967 album by The Left Banke

Studio album by the Left Banke
- Released: January 1967
- Recorded: December 1965 – January 1967
- Studio: World United and Mercury, New York City
- Genre: Baroque pop; chamber pop
- Length: 27:59
- Label: Smash
- Producer: Harry Lookofsky

The Left Banke chronology
Walk Away Renée/Pretty Ballerina (1967)	The Left Banke Too (1968)

Singles from Walk Away Renée / Pretty Ballerina
- 1. "Walk Away Renée" / "I Haven't Got the Nerve" Released: July 1966; 2. "Pretty Ballerina" / "Lazy Day" Released: December 1966; 3. "She May Call You Up Tonight" / "Barterers and Their Wives" Released: May 1967

Walk Away Renée/Pretty Ballerina is the debut studio album by the American baroque pop band the Left Banke, released in January 1967. Named after its two hit singles, "Walk Away Renée" and "Pretty Ballerina", it peaked at number 67 on the Billboard Albums chart. Although the album was not widely popular upon its initial release, and fell into relative obscurity for a time, it is now viewed as a definitive example of baroque pop music.

The album spent eleven weeks on the Billboard 200, peaking at number 67. After its initial release, the album remained out of print for decades. It was, however, available in its entirety on the 1992 compilation There's Gonna Be a Storm: The Complete Recordings 1966–1969. On June 28, 2011, Walk Away Renée/Pretty Ballerina was reissued on Sundazed Music, remastered by Bob Irwin.

== Background ==
During 1966, the Left Banke released the singles "Walk Away Renée" and "Pretty Ballerina", which peaked at number 5 and number 15 respectively on the Billboard Hot 100. Written by keyboardist Michael Brown, the son of producer and jazz violinist Harry Lookofsky, both singles and their B-sides were incorporated into the album.

Early recording sessions for Walk Away Renée/Pretty Ballerina started in December 1965 in the small World United Studio at 48th and Broadway in Manhattan, with sessions for the singles taking place in March and then November 1966. The remaining album sessions took place in January 1967 at Mercury Studios in New York. During the course of 1966, Michael Brown's father and the band's manager/producer, Harry Lookofsky, fired both original drummer Lisa David-Schierhorst and guitarist Jeff Winfield, replacing them with George Cameron and Rick Brand.

Most tracks on the album featured lead singer Steve Martin Caro, with harmony vocals by bassist Tom Finn and drummer Cameron; most tracks are also augmented by session musicians, with keyboardist Brown being the only band instrumentalist to appear on every song. However, the band itself does play on the tracks "Let Go of You Girl" and "Lazy Day". "What Do You Know", featuring lead vocals by Brown, is an early example of country rock, contemporary to similar efforts by the Byrds, the International Submarine Band, and Buffalo Springfield.

== Critical reception ==
Professional ratings
Review scores
Source	Rating
AllMusic	4.5/5 stars

Mark Deming of AllMusic rated Walk Away Renée/Pretty Ballerina four-and-a-half stars out of five. He praised the album's diverse sound and noted that the record had marked the Left Banke for some time as "one of the best and most innovative American bands in rock & roll."

== Track listing ==
Side one
No.	Title	Writer(s)	Length
1.	"Pretty Ballerina" (Smash single 2074)	Michael Brown	2:32
2.	"She May Call You Up Tonight" (Smash single 2097)	Michael Brown, Steve Martin Caro	2:18
3.	"Barterers and Their Wives" (Smash single 2097b)	Michael Brown, Tom Feher	2:56
4.	"I've Got Something on My Mind" (Smash single 2119b)	Brown, Martin-Caro, Cameron	2:46
5.	"Let Go of You Girl"	Brown, Martin-Caro, Cameron	2:53
6.	"Evening Gown"	Michael Brown, Tom Feher	1:46

Side two
No.	Title	Writer(s)	Length
1.	"Walk Away Renée" (Smash single 2041)	Brown, Tony Sansone, Bob Calilli	2:40
2.	"What Do You Know"	Michael Brown, Tom Feher	2:57
3.	"Shadows Breaking Over My Head"	Michael Brown, Steve Martin-Caro	2:34
4.	"I Haven't Got the Nerve" (Smash single 2041b)	George Cameron, Steve Martin-Caro	2:13
5.	"Lazy Day" (Smash single 2074b)	Michael Brown, Steve Martin-Caro	2:24

== Personnel ==
The Left Banke

- Steve Martin Caro – lead vocals
- Michael Brown – piano, harpsichord, clavinet; lead vocals (on "What Do You Know")
- Tom Finn – bass guitar, backing vocals
- George Cameron – drums, percussion, backing vocals; co-lead vocals on "I Haven't Got The Nerve"
- Lisa David-Schierhorst – drums
- Jeff Winfield – electric guitar
- Rick Brand – electric guitar

Additional personnel

- Hugh McCracken – guitar
- Al Gorgoni – guitar
- George "Fluffer" Hirsh – guitar
- John Abbott – bass, guitar, string arrangements
- Seymour Barab – bass, cello
- Joe Mack – bass
- Al Rogers – drums
- Buddy Saltzman – drums
- Harry Lookofsky – violin
- George Marge – oboe
- Jackie Kelso – flute (uncredited)

== Chart positions ==
Album

Year	Chart	Peak Position
1967	Billboard 200	67
1967	Cashbox	59

Singles

Year	Single	Chart	Peak Position
1966	"Walk Away Renée"	Billboard Hot 100	5
1966	"Walk Away Renée"	Cashbox	2
1966	"Walk Away Renée"	RPM magazine	3
1966	"Pretty Ballerina"	Billboard Hot 100	15
1966	"Pretty Ballerina"	Cashbox	12
1966	"Pretty Ballerina"	RPM magazine	4
1967	"She May Call You Up Tonight"	Billboard Hot 100	120
