= List of baroque pop artists =

This is a list of artists who have been described as general purveyors of baroque pop, a genre identifiable for its appropriation of Baroque compositional styles (contrapuntal melodies and functional harmony patterns) and dramatic or melancholic gestures. Harpsichords figure prominently, while oboes, French horns, and string quartets are also common. It emerged in the mid-1960s as artists pursued a majestic, orchestral sound.

== 1960s–70s ==
- Christian Anders
- The Association
- The Beach Boys
- The Beatles
- Bee Gees
- Colin Blunstone
- Michael Brown
- The Free Design
- Robin Gibb
- Margo Guryan
- Harpers Bizarre
- The Kinks
- The Left Banke
- Mannheim Steamroller
- The Merry-Go-Round
- The Millennium
- The Moody Blues
- Van Dyke Parks
- Procol Harum
- Keith Reid
- Emitt Rhodes
- Sparks
- The Walker Brothers
- Scott Walker
- The Zombies
- Phil Ochs

== 1980s–present ==
- Anohni and the Johnsons
- Fiona Apple
- Arcade Fire
- The Autumn Defense
- Bat for Lashes
- Beirut
- Belle and Sebastian
- Andrew Bird
- Gary Brooker
- Kate Bush
- The Decemberists
- Lana Del Rey
- The Divine Comedy
- Marianne Faithfull
- Florence and the Machine
- Fun
- Grizzly Bear
- Hjaltalín
- The Last Dinner Party
- Pierre Lapointe
- The Last Shadow Puppets
- Tor Miller
- The Miserable Rich
- Momus
- The Mummers
- My Life Story
- Panic! at the Disco
- Parenthetical Girls
- Perfume Genius
- Princess Chelsea
- Ra Ra Riot
- Regina Spektor
- San Fermin
- School is Cool
- Scud Mountain Boys
- Silverchair
- Suckers
- Vampire Weekend
- Rufus Wainwright
- Wild Beasts
