= Reach Out (Four Tops album) =

Studio album by Four Tops
- Released: July 1967
- Recorded: 1966–67
- Studios: Hitsville U.S.A., Detroit
- Genres: R&B; Soul
- Label: Motown
- Producers: Brian Holland, Lamont Dozier, Smokey Robinson, Clarence Paul

Four Tops chronology
On Broadway (1967)	Reach Out (1967)	The Four Tops Greatest Hits (1967)

Singles from Reach Out
- 1. "Reach Out I'll Be There" Released: August 18, 1966; 2. "Standing in the Shadows of Love" Released: November 28, 1966; 3. "Bernadette" Released: February 16, 1967; 4. "7-Rooms of Gloom" Released: May 2, 1967; 5. "Walk Away Renée" Released: January 18, 1968; 6. "If I Were a Carpenter" Released: April 11, 1968

Reach Out is the fifth studio album by the Four Tops, issued on Motown Records in July 1967.

== Overview ==
The group's biggest-selling studio album, Reach Out includes six of the Four Tops' most successful singles including the US and UK #1 hit "Reach Out I'll Be There", "Standing in the Shadows of Love", "Bernadette" and "7-Rooms of Gloom".

The album was the group's last with the songwriting team of Holland–Dozier–Holland and also features covers of contemporary pop hits selected by Berry Gordy, among them Tim Hardin's "If I Were a Carpenter", the Left Banke's "Walk Away Renée" and two songs originally recorded by the Monkees.

In 2020, Reach Out was ranked number 429 in Rolling Stone magazine's "The 500 Greatest Albums of All Time" list.

== Chart performance ==
The album reached No. 11 on Billboard Top LPs chart, on the Billboard Top R&B Albums it peaked at No. 3, on Cashbox Top 100 Albums chart the album peaked at No. 5, and in Canada it peaked at No. 25, and was their first charting album there. Overseas, it peaked at number 4 in the United Kingdom, where it was released in November after delays. Eventually, the BPI certified the album Silver in the UK.

== Critical reception ==
Professional ratings
Review scores
Source	Rating
AllMusic	4/5 stars
Record Mirror	4/5 stars

Upon release, Record Mirror praised the album's "four fine 'A' sides and their versions of some of the best non-R&B tunes around" while Penny Valentine of Disc and Music Echo described "Walk Away Renée" as the album's "only outstanding track".

Among retrospective reviews, BBC Music's Daryl Easlea has described Reach Out as the Four Tops' greatest album, praising its cohesion and noting that it "can be seen as the high-water mark of the first decade of Motown". Easlea considered the album and The Four Tops Greatest Hits to contain "some of the most passionate, soulful music, exquisite playing and well-written melodies of all time". AllMusic's John Bush was critical of the album's cover songs, opining "though it's one of the best Four Tops records of the '60s, Reach Out still feels weighted down by a few vain attempts at adult pop crossover". Writing in Motown Encyclopedia, Graham Betts felt the album "reads like a greatest hits package" and considered Holland, Dozier and Holland to have "bowed out on a high".

== Track listing ==
All tracks produced by Brian Holland and Lamont Dozier, except for "Wonderful Baby", produced by Smokey Robinson; and "What Else is There to Do (But Think About You)", produced by Clarence Paul.

Side One

No.	Title	Writer(s)	Length
1.	"Reach Out I'll Be There"	Holland–Dozier–Holland	2:58
2.	"Walk Away Renée"	Michael Brown, Bob Calilli, Tony Sansone	2:42
3.	"7-Rooms of Gloom"	Holland–Dozier–Holland	2:31
4.	"If I Were a Carpenter"	Tim Hardin	2:47
5.	"Last Train to Clarksville"	Tommy Boyce, Bobby Hart	2:38
6.	"I'll Turn to Stone"	Holland–Dozier–Holland, R. Dean Taylor	2:38

Side Two

No.	Title	Writer(s)	Length
7.	"I'm a Believer"	Neil Diamond	2:39
8.	"Standing in the Shadows of Love"	Holland–Dozier–Holland	2:36
9.	"Bernadette"	Holland–Dozier–Holland	2:59
10.	"Cherish"	Terry Kirkman	3:00
11.	"Wonderful Baby"	Smokey Robinson	2:32
12.	"What Else Is There to Do (But Think About You)"	Stevie Wonder, Clarence Paul, Morris Broadnax	2:30
Total length:			32:30

== Personnel ==
- Levi Stubbs – lead baritone vocals
- Abdul "Duke" Fakir – first tenor backing vocals
- Renaldo "Obie" Benson – bass-baritone backing vocals
- Lawrence Payton – second tenor backing vocals
- The Andantes – additional backing vocals (except on "What Else is There to Do (But Think About You)")
- The Funk Brothers – instrumentation
- James Meese – cover artwork

== Charts ==
Chart (1967)	Peak position
US Billboard Top LPs	11
US Billboard Hot R&B Albums	3
US Cashbox Top 100 Albums	5
UK Record Retailer Top Albums	4
CAN RPM Top Albums	25

== Certification ==
Region	Certification	Certified units/sales
United Kingdom (BPI)	Silver	60,000^{^}
^{^} Shipments figures based on certification alone.
