= Stories (band) =

1970s American band

- Origin: New York City, U.S.
- Genres: Rock, pop
- Years active: 1972–1974
- Labels: Kama Sutra, Raven
- Past members: Ian Lloyd; Bryan Madey; Steve Love; Michael Brown; Kenny Aaronson; Ken Bichel; Richie Ranno

Stories was an American early 1970s rock and pop music band based in New York City. The band consisted of keyboardist Michael Brown, bassist/vocalist Ian Lloyd, guitarist Steve Love, and drummer Bryan Madey, and had a Number 1 hit with a cover of Hot Chocolate's "Brother Louie."

== Band history ==
Ian Lloyd (born Lloyd Buonconsiglio, 1947, Seattle) and Michael Brown (b. Michael Lookofsky, April 25, 1949, Brooklyn) were introduced by their fathers, Peter Buonconsiglio and Harry Lookofsky, two old friends who had worked together for years as session violinists. Lloyd had been singing for years and had attracted local notice recording as Lloyd London. Brown had already experienced substantial mainstream success, having led and performed with his group The Left Banke, which had made the U.S. charts with the Brown-penned singles "Walk Away Renee" (No. 5, 1966) and "Pretty Ballerina" (No. 15, 1967).

The two set about becoming a Beatlesque band. They recruited New Yorkers Steve Love and Brian Madey and located an interested record label in Kama Sutra. A self-titled album and a single – "I'm Coming Home" (No. 42, 1972) – followed.

Afterward, the band started work on their second LP with producer Eddie Kramer, About Us (1973). After the album's release, Brown left the band to pursue another project.

"This group tests our male-timbre chauvinism—Ian Lloyd sounds disconcertingly like a goil. Too bad he voices the same old male sentiments—don't let me down, push me 'round, or complain when I leave at the dawning—because the music is special: dense, clean, kinetic, almost mid-Beatles in spirit, but contemporary."

— Christgau's Record Guide: Rock Albums of the Seventies (1981)

About Us did relatively well, but it did not initially include the group's new single, "Brother Louie." The song about a black woman and her white boyfriend had been a UK hit for Hot Chocolate earlier that year. (The group's soon-to-be new bassist, Kenny Aaronson, was responsible for the Motown-like bass line that helped give the song its funky character.) Once issued as the Stories' fifth single, it became a big hit, reaching No. 1 in the United States. It spent two weeks at No. 1 and remained on the Billboard chart for 18 weeks, with an R.I.A.A. gold disc awarded on August 22, 1973.

A new version of the LP was issued which did include the hit single, and the album proceeded to sell well. In some cases, old copies of the LP which did not include the single were shipped inside album covers that did list the single.

Lloyd did remain with Stories for one more album – Traveling Underground (1973) before leaving the group. Bassist Kenny Aaronson (b. April 14, 1952, Brooklyn) (formerly of Dust), who had performed bass on the "Brother Louie" cover, and keyboardist Ken Bichel (b. 1945, Detroit) stepped in to fill the void. The new group made the Billboard Hot 100 with "Mammy Blue" (No. 50, 1973) and "If It Feels Good, Do It" which was a cover of a song by the band Climax (No. 88, 1974). Before the group's break-up, Love left and was replaced by Richie Ranno.

Lloyd has since recorded several solo albums and done studio work for Foreigner, Fotomaker, and Peter Frampton. Lloyd was also one of the first artists to perform songs written by Bryan Adams that Adams would later record himself, which led to the 1984 formation of Fast Forward, which included Lloyd and several other persons directly or indirectly associated with Adams. The resulting album, Living in Fiction, featured several of Adams' songs. Brown went on to form The Beckies, another Beatlesque band. Love reappeared in the early 1980s as Landscape. Madey, after a two album stay with the Earl Slick Band, provided accompaniment for Peggy Lee. Aaronson has remained busy. He was co-founder (with Carmine Appice's brother Vinnie) of Axis, and he did sessions for Hall & Oates, Billy Squier, ex-Mountain Leslie West, Foghat, Bob Dylan, Tom Guerra, and Rick Derringer. Bichel has done session work, and so has Love. Ranno found later success as a member of Starz.

Raven Records released Stories and About Us on a single CD, including the bonus track "Another Love" (for its time a fairly suggestive song about bisexuality), being the last single by the group, released in 1974.

A re-recording featuring elements of the original Hot Chocolate version and their cover of "Brother Louie" featuring Ian Lloyd and produced by Reggie Watts is used as the theme song for the American TV series Louie, starring Louis C.K.

== Discography ==
=== Albums ===
Year	Album	US	Label
1972	Stories	182	Kama Sutra
1973	About Us (Note: Charted after it was reissued with "Brother Louie" added to the end of side two.)	29	Kama Sutra
1973	Traveling Underground	—	Kama Sutra
"—" denotes releases that did not chart.

=== Singles ===
Year	Title (A-side / B-side)	Chart positions		
Year	Title (A-side / B-side)	US Pop	US R&B	Canada
1972	"Top of the City" b/w "Step Back"	―	―	―
1972	"I'm Coming Home" b/w "You Told Me"	42	―	74
1973	"Darling" b/w "Take Cover"	―	―	―
1973	"Love Is in Motion" b/w "Changes Have Begun"	―	―	―
1973	"Brother Louie" b/w "What Comes After?"	1	22	1
1973	"Mammy Blue" b/w "Travelling Underground"	50	―	36
1974	"If It Feels Good, Do It" b/w "Circles"	88	―	70
1974	"Another Love" b/w "Love Is in Motion"	―	―	―
"—" denotes releases that did not chart.
