= The Left Banke Too =

1968 album by The Left Banke

Studio album by the Left Banke
- Released: November 1968
- Recorded: September 1967 – October 1968
- Studio: Capitol and Olmstead, New York City
- Genre: Baroque pop; psychedelic pop; sunshine pop; rock
- Length: 31:26
- Label: Smash
- Producer: Paul Leka; Michael Brown; Arthur Schroeck; Gene Radice

The Left Banke chronology
Walk Away Renée/Pretty Ballerina (1967)	The Left Banke Too (1968)	Strangers on a Train (1986)

Singles from The Left Banke Too
- 1. "Desirée" / "I've Got Something on My Mind" Released: June 1967; 2. "Dark Is the Bark" / "My Friend Today" Released: June 1968; 3. "Goodbye Holly" / "Sing Little Bird Sing" Released: November 1968; 4. "Bryant Hotel" / "Give the Man a Hand" Released: February 1969; 5. "Nice to See You" / "There's Gonna Be a Storm" Released: May 1969

The Left Banke Too is the second studio album by American baroque pop band the Left Banke, released by Smash Records in 1968. It would be the final album of the band's initial lifespan, with their next album not appearing until 1986.

== Background ==
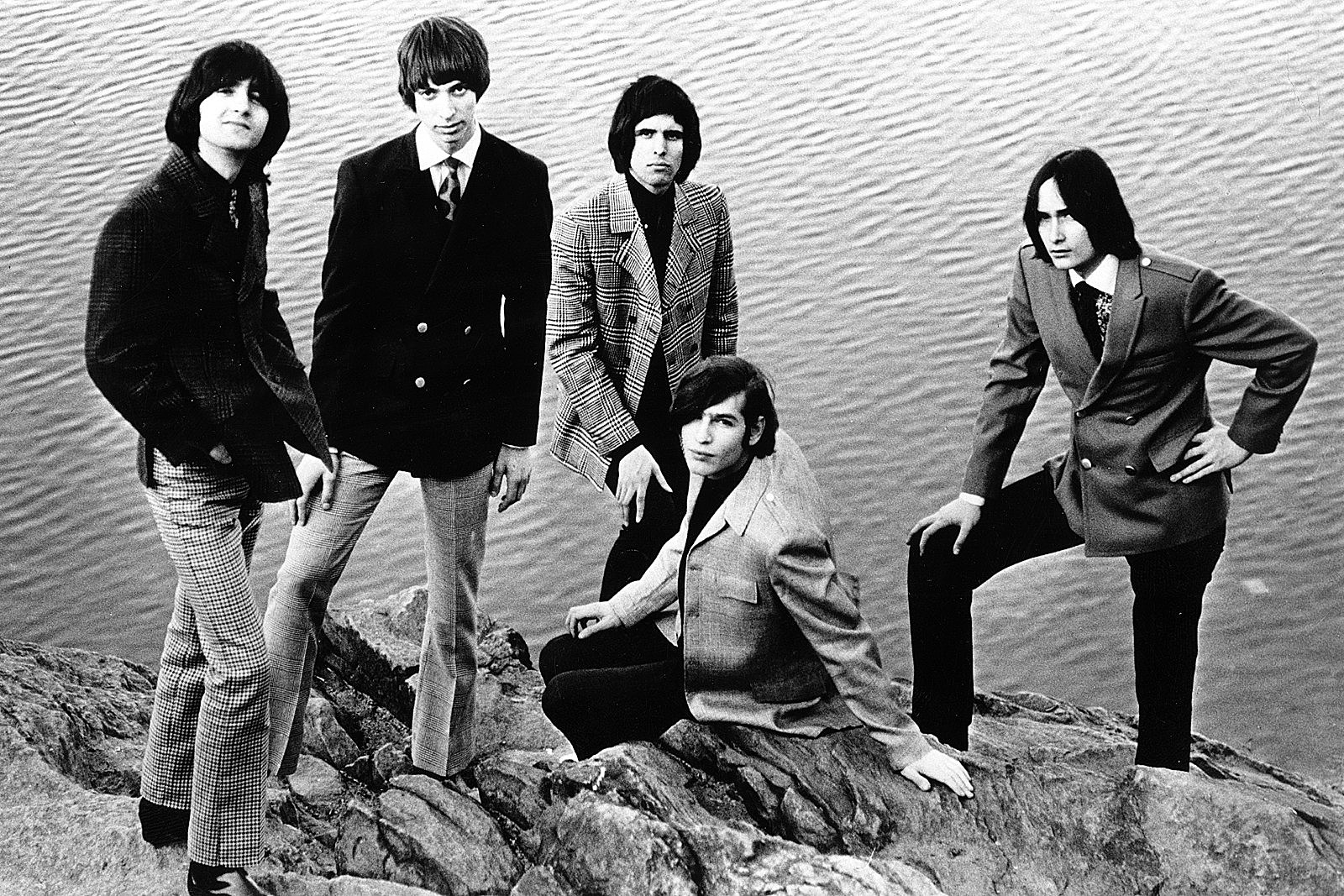
The Left Banke in 1966. The initial line-up fell apart during the album's making.

In between the release of the Left Banke's debut album Walk Away Renee/Pretty Ballerina and the making of this album, the original five-piece band had been whittled down to a trio after the departures of songwriter and keyboardist Michael Brown and guitarist Rick Brand. To replace them, the band brought in guitarist Tom Feher, who had written songs with Brown for the group's first album.

Half of the album, consisted tracks that had been issued as singles in the period since the release of the band's debut album in February 1967. "Desirée", released as a single in June 1967, barely scraped into the Billboard Hot 100 chart, peaking at number 98. The band's next two singles, "Dark is the Bark", released in the summer of 1968, and "Goodbye Holly" following in November 1968, both failed to chart. Following the release of the album in November 1968, a fourth and fifth single were issued, "Bryant Hotel" b/w "Give The Man A Hand" and "Nice To See You" b/w "There's Gonna Be A Storm" respectively, but they also failed to chart.

Unlike its predecessor, The Left Banke Too contains a wide range of musical styles, including incorporations of psychedelic pop, sunshine pop, rock music, and arrangements influenced by baroque music. For recording, several additional contributions were made, including a pre-Aerosmith Steven Tyler, then known as Steve Tallarico, providing backing vocals to several songs on the album such as "My Friend Today" and "Dark is the Bark".

== Releases ==
Professional ratings
Review scores
Source	Rating
AllMusic	4/5 stars

The entire album was at one time available on the 1992 compact disc There's Gonna Be a Storm: The Complete Recordings 1966–1969, but that compilation went out of print in the mid-1990s. On June 28, 2011, The Left Banke Too was reissued on Sundazed Music, remastered by Bob Irwin.

== Track listing ==
Details are taken from the 1968 Smash Records release and might differ from other releases.

Side one
No.	Title	Writer(s)	Length
1.	"Goodbye Holly"	Tom Feher	2:42
2.	"There's Gonna Be a Storm"	Tom Finn	4:03
3.	"Sing Little Bird Sing"	Tom Feher	3:04
4.	"Nice to See You"	Tom Finn	2:39
5.	"Give the Man a Hand"	Marvin Potocki	2:31

Side two
No.	Title	Writer(s)	Length
1.	"Bryant Hotel"	Tom Feher	3:22
2.	"Desirée"	Michael Brown, Tom Feher	2:39
3.	"Dark is the Bark"	George Cameron, Finn, Steve Martin Caro	3:27
4.	"In the Morning Light"	Michael Brown, Tom Feher	2:47
5.	"My Friend Today"	Tom Finn	3:03

== Personnel ==
The Left Banke

- Steve Martin Caro – lead vocals; drums on "Goodbye Holly", tambourine on "Nice To See You", bass on "Bryant Hotel"
- Tom Finn – bass, guitar, backing vocals; lead vocals on "Nice to See You" & "There's Gonna Be A Storm"
- George Cameron – drums, percussion, backing vocals; lead vocals on "Goodbye Holly" and "Bryant Hotel"
- Tom Feher – piano; guitar on "Sing Little Bird" & "Bryant Hotel"
- Michael Brown – piano, organ on "Desirée" & "In The Morning Light"

Additional personnel

- Steve Tallarico – backing vocals on "Nice to See You", "Give the Man a Hand", "Dark is the Bark" & "My Friend Today", tambourine on "Dark is the Bark"
- Paul Griffin – keyboards on "Dark is the Bark"
- Paul Leka – string arrangements; piano on "Bryant Hotel"
- Rick Brand – banjo on "Bryant Hotel"
- Hugh McCracken – guitar on "Desirée" & "Dark is the Bark"
- Ralph Casale – guitar on "Dark is the Bark"
- Marvin Potocki – guitar on "Give the Man a Hand"
- Chet Amsterdam – bass on "Dark is the Bark"
- Joe Mack – bass on "Desirée"
- Bobby Gregg – drums on "Desirée"
- Artie Schroek – vibraphone, drums, string arrangements on "Dark is the Bark"
- John Abbott – horn arrangements on "In the Morning Light"
- Ray Alonge – french horn on "Dark is the Bark"
- Ray Desio – trombone on "Dark is the Bark"
- Marvin Stamm – trumpet on "Dark is the Bark"
- George Young – woodwinds on "Dark is the Bark"

== Charts ==
Singles

Single	Year	Chart	Peak
"Desiree"	1967	Billboard Hot 100	98
