= Scott Schinder =

American music writer and critic (1961–2023)

- Born: Scott Schinder; June 14, 1961
- Died: June 5, 2023 (aged 61); Austin, Texas
- Occupations: Writer, music critic
- Years active: 1980s–2023

Scott Schinder (June 14, 1961 – June 5, 2023) was an American music critic and journalist from Long Island, New York.

== Biography ==
Schinder, a native of Long Island, New York, was born on June 14, 1961. He attended Wantagh Senior High School in Wantagh, New York, graduating in 1979.

In the early 1980s, Schinder's love of music made him a frequent presence in New York City clubs such as CBGB and Maxwells. This led him to become a prolific writer and music historian. Schinder's work was published in nearly every major music publication of the era, including Rolling Stone, Entertainment Weekly, Billboard, Time Out New York, The Austin Chronicle, Please Kill Me, Creem, Musician, Newsday, Stereophile, New Musical Express, Melody Maker, and many others. He also wrote liner notes for dozens of albums, all six editions of the Trouser Press Record Guide, and various Rolling Stone books, such as 1996's Rolling Stone's Alt-Rock-A-Rama.

Schinder moved to Austin, Texas, in 2011. Despite having spent a majority of his life in New York, Schinder had strong ties to Austin, having attended the inaugural South by Southwest in 1987 and visiting regularly before moving there.

Schinder died on June 5, 2023, after a long battle with an undisclosed illness, which he had kept private. He was 61.

== Selected bibliography ==
=== Books ===
- Scott Schinder and Andy Schwartz, Icons of Rock: An Encyclopedia of the Legends Who Changed Music Forever (Bloomsbury Academic, 2007)
- Scott Schinder, Rolling Stone's Alt-Rock-A-Rama: An Outrageous Compendium of Facts, Fiction, Trivia, and Critiques on Alternative Rock (Delta, 1996)

=== Album liner notes ===
- The Psychedelic Furs, Should God Forget: A Retrospective (Columbia/Legacy, 1997)
- Steppenwolf, All Time Greatest Hits (MCA, 1999)
- Blue Öyster Cult, Don't Fear the Reaper: The Best of Blue Öyster Cult (Columbia/Legacy, 2000)
- Peter Frampton, Anthology: The History Of Peter Frampton (A&M Records, 2001)
- John Hiatt, John Hiatt Anthology (Hip-O, 2001)
- Phil Ochs, The Best Of Phil Ochs (A&M Records, 2002)
- Robert Palmer, Best Of Both Worlds: The Robert Palmer Anthology (1974–2001) (Hip-O, 2002)
- Doug Sahm the Sir Douglas Quintet, The Complete Mercury Recordings (Hip-O, 2005)
- Various artists, Southern Rock Gold (Hip-O Records, 2005)
- Eric Clapton, Eric Clapton (Deluxe Edition, 2006 reissue)
- Robyn Hitchcock, Storefront Hitchcock: Music From The Jonathan Demme Picture (Warner Bros. Records, 2007)
- Jerry Lee Lewis, Original Sun Singles '56–'60 (Sundazed Music, 2009)
- Sam The Sham and the Pharaohs, The MGM Singles (Sundazed Music, 2011)
- Duane Allman, Skydog: The Duane Allman Retrospective (Rounder Records, 2013)
- Cowboy, 5'll Getcha Ten (Real Gone Music, 2014 reissue)
- Johnny Cash, The Complete Mercury Albums 1986–1991 (Mercury, 2020)
- The Left Banke, Strangers on a Train (Omnivore Recordings, 2022 reissue)
