= Renée Fladen-Kamm =

American singer (born 1948)

- Born: Renée A. Fladen; August 3, 1948 (age 78); New York City, US
- Occupation: vocal coach
- Known for: Inspiration for the songs "Walk Away Renée" and "Pretty Ballerina"
- Spouse: Howard I. Kamm (m.1967–1974)
- Partner: Tom Finn (1960s)

Renée A. Fladen (born 3 August 1948 in New York City), also known as Renée Fladen-Kamm, is an American singer and vocal coach.

Among her recordings are those of medieval music as vocal director of the San Francisco-based Sherwood Consort. She also worked on the musical direction of theatrical works directed by Mary Devlin, another member of the Sherwood Consort.

== Personal life ==
In the 1960s, Fladen was in a relationship with Tom Finn, bass guitarist for The Left Banke. Fladen is said to have been the inspiration of the Left Banke songs "Walk Away Renée" (1966), "Pretty Ballerina" (1966) and "She May Call You Up Tonight" (1967).

Fladen married Howard I. Kamm (born 1946) in 1967, but the couple divorced in San Francisco in 1974.

When Michael Brown died, she sent her condolences via Finn, who was giving a speech at Brown's memorial service, held at the church Brown had attended. According to him, she was very sincere and hurt due to his death. He also said she had not been in contact with the band for 49 years and did not appreciate the attention the song brought her.
