= Bert Sommer =

American singer (1949–1990)

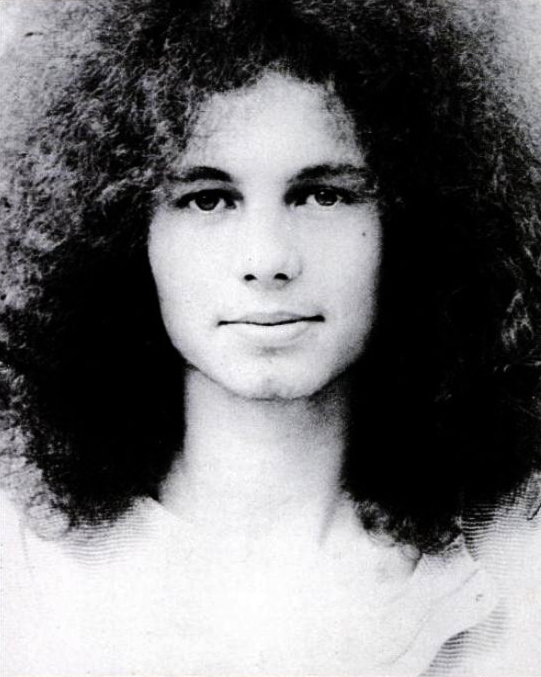
- Sommer in 1970

Background information
- Born: February 7, 1949; New York City, U.S.
- Died: July 23, 1990 (aged 41) Troy, New York, U.S.
- Genres: Folk; rock; baroque pop
- Occupations: Singer, Songwriter, Actor
- Years active: 1960s–1970s
- Labels: Capitol; EMI Records
- Formerly of: The Left Banke
- Website: www.bertsommer.com

Bert Sommer (February 7, 1949 – July 23, 1990) was an American folk singer and songwriter. He appeared in the musical Hair and at the Woodstock Festival, and he released several albums as a singer-songwriter.

== Early life ==
Sommer was born in New York City and grew up in Queens and Hartsdale, New York. He was a self-taught musician (piano and guitar), who began writing songs in his teens. He attended Woodlands High School as well as Quintano's School for Young Professionals in Manhattan.

== Career ==
=== 1960s ===
He became friendly with other young musicians and songwriters in the area, including Peter Sabatino, Leslie West, Tom Feher, and Michael Brown, and wrote several songs for West (then known as Weinstein)'s band, the Vagrants, including their single "Beside the Sea", co-written with producer Felix Pappalardi and his wife Gail Collins.

In 1967, Sommer was hired to join a "new" version of the Baroque pop band The Left Banke. They had been inactive shortly after the release of their song "Walk Away Renée", and their manager put together a band to tour as the band to profit from the single. Sommer also co-wrote the Left Banke single "And Suddenly" with member Michael Brown. He also sang lead on "Ivy Ivy", written by Tom Feher. The group (which included Michael McKean on bass) soon fell apart, following legal threats by original Left Banke singer Steve Martin's lawyers. In the same baroque vein as the Left Banke, Sommer wrote "Brink of Death", recorded by the band Childe Harold with an arrangement by Wendy Carlos.

Next, Sommer was recruited as a member of "the Tribe" for the musical Hair, and then promoted to the role of Woof. His "frizzed-out Afro" hair and eyes were featured on the Los Angeles Playbill for Hair in 1969.

==== Woodstock festival ====
Sommer had been signed by Capitol Records, and in June 1969 he released his first album, The Road to Travel. It was produced by Artie Kornfeld, who also produced his next two albums. Kornfeld's involvement with the Woodstock Festival led to Sommer being invited to perform there. He was the third act to perform on the opening Friday, August 15, 1969. He sang ten songs, including "Jennifer", a song inspired by his fellow Hair performer Jennifer Warnes, and Simon & Garfunkel's "America", after which he received the festival's first standing ovation. Sommer played with Ira Stone (guitar, Hammond organ, harmonica) and Charles Bilello (bass). According to some accounts, because he was signed to a rival record label, none of his audio performance was made publicly available until 2009. However, his performance singing "Jennifer" was captured in D.A. Pennebaker's documentary Woodstock Diary (1994). In 2019, the entire Bert Sommer set became part of the Woodstock 50th anniversary 38-CD set, restored by Andy Zax.

=== 1970s ===
Sommer's second album, Inside Bert Sommer, was released in May 1970 on the Eleuthera label, a subsidiary of Buddah Records, and featured the single "We're All Playing in the Same Band", which he wrote at, for, and about the Woodstock festival, about his experience there. The song reached number 48 on the Hot 100 in September 1970. Sommer continued to perform in and around New York, often opening the bill for major acts such as Ike and Tina Turner and the Byrds. A third album, Bert Sommer, was released on Buddah in 1971, but, like Sommer's other albums, was commercially unsuccessful. Sommer spent some time in a rehabilitation facility in the early 1970s, then formed a trio in Brockport, New York. Sommer, Landis & Roberts, with Gary Roberts (also known as Johnny Rabb) and Rob Landis played local clubs and cafes in the college town for a couple years.

While Sommer continued to write songs, he received another offer. After being encouraged to audition by music producer Artie Ripp, he appeared as "Flatbush" of Kaptain Kool and the Kongs on The Krofft Supershow in 1976, but he did not reprise the role in the second season. In 1977, his fourth album, also titled Bert Sommer, produced in Los Angeles by Ron Dante, was released by Capitol Records. Again, the album was unsuccessful, and he was dropped by the label. The follow-up album that never happened, to have been produced by Trevor Lawrence, contained songs such as "You", featured in the films The Patriot (1986) and Stella (1990).

Sommer returned to Albany in August 1983 and almost immediately began to perform in local venues with Johnny Rabb, as well as Carla and Kevin McKrell, in The Fabulous Newports. He also teamed up with Eddie Angel and Johnny Rabb in The Poor Boys. His last performance was again with Rabb, at an outdoor concert in Troy, New York on June 11, 1990.

== Death ==
Sommer died in Troy, New York on July 23, 1990, of a respiratory illness.

== Discography ==
- The Road To Travel (Capitol, 1968)
- Inside Bert Sommer (Eleuthera, 1970)
- Bert Sommer (Buddah, 1971)
- Bert Sommer (Capitol, 1977)
