= Fast Forward (band) =

Canadian pop and AOR band

- Origin: Vancouver, British Columbia, Canada
- Genres: Pop, AOR
- Years active: 1984
- Labels: Island
- Past members: Ian Lloyd; Bruce Fairbairn; Jim Vallance; Jimmy Lowell; Andrew Kirin; Patrick Mahassen

Fast Forward was a Canadian band, formed in 1984 in Vancouver. Featuring:- Ian Lloyd, former lead singer of Stories and a solo artist, the band released one album, Living in Fiction.

== History ==
Before the formation of Fast Forward, Ian Lloyd had developed a solo career, following the 1974 breakup of his former band, Stories. Lloyd released three solo albums between 1976 and 1980, including "Goosebumps" and "3WC (Third Wave Civilization)". "3WC" was notable for its inclusion of Lloyd's cover of "Straight from the Heart", three years prior to Bryan Adams releasing his own version, to worldwide acclaim. It was also co-produced by Bruce Fairbairn and featured Adams' then songwriting partner Jim Vallance, contributing many of the songs and playing drums.

Many peoples that were involved with "3WC" became involved with the Fast Forward project in 1984. The project was initially to be another Ian Lloyd solo album, but Lloyd requested that it be recognized as a band effort. The recording band was primarily Bryan Adams' band. The album, Living in Fiction, was co-produced by Bruce Fairbairn and Ian Lloyd. Bruce Fairbairn also contributed horns and backing vocals as a principal member of the band, which also included Jimmy Lowell (bass and synthesizers), Andrew Kirin (synthesizers), Patrick Mahassen (guitar, backing vocals) and Jim Vallance (credited as Rodney Higgs) (drums).

Lowell had previously been a member of Spider, a band that also included Holly Knight and Anton Fig and which released two albums in 1980 and 1981. After Holly Knight left the band to pursue a solo career, Lowell and the remaining members of Spider band joined with keyboardist Beau Hill to form Shanghai, which recorded one album in 1982, before disbanding. Guest musicians on Living in Fiction included Bob Rock (guitar) and the aforementioned Beau Hill (keyboards and backing vocals). Hill also wrote the title track.

Fast Forward was primarily a studio band. One video was released for "What's It Gonna Take", and there was one live band performance on Canadian radio. Following the lack of commercial success of the record, the band broke up.

== Post-Fast Forward ==
After the breakup of Fast Forward, Ian Lloyd continued his solo career. Bruce Fairbairn continued as a musician and record producer, and was particularly notable as the producer of Permanent Vacation (1987), the comeback album for Aerosmith, among other Aerosmith albums, and other notable albums. Fairbairn died suddenly in 1999, at the age of 49. Jim Vallance contributed to various albums, such as those of Aerosmith, as a songwriter and musician, in addition to his songwriting with Bryan Adams.

Guitarist Patrick Mahassen later contributed a co-written song to Loverboy. Mahassen, using the name Patrick Mason, also made a name for himself as a member and touring musician for a succession of Swiss hard rock bands, Crown, briefly Krokus, and China, with whom he recorded the 1989 Sign in the Sky album as lead vocalist. Following a ten-year career as a musician, Mahassen developed an international communications career, including a position as Switzerland resources director for Transparency International.

Andrew Kirin, a stage name for Andrew Krehel, became a noted jazz accompanist, as well as a member of the new wave band The Jetsonz. Kirin died in 2007.
