= Playback (The Appletree Theatre album) =

Studio album by The Appletree Theatre
- Released: 1968
- Recorded: 1967; Regent Sound Studios, NYC; Dick Charles Recording Inc. Mirasound Studios
- Genre: Sunshine pop, psychedelic
- Length: 33:39
- Label: Verve Forecast 3042
- Producer: Peter Spargo

Professional ratings
Review scores
Source	Rating
Allmusic	3/5 stars

Playback is an album recorded by The Appletree Theatre in 1967.

The project was set up by brothers Terry and John Boylan. It was written, directed and performed by the Boylan brothers, supported by leading jazz session musicians including Larry Coryell and Eric Gale.

Playback was essentially a loosely woven concept album, divided into three acts, an overture, and an epilogue, with full-length pop songs such as "Hightower Square" and "I Wonder If Louise Is Home" linked by vocal narratives and snatches of music, including elements of jazz, acid rock, and classical music, sometimes given distorted sonic treatment. It was released on the Verve Forecast label in the US and UK in 1968, with a different cover to the UK re-release from 1972 on the MGM Records label. John Lennon, in a 1968 interview with Penny Nichols in London, called Playback one of his favourite new albums, and Philip Proctor acknowledged its influence on his own group, The Firesign Theatre. Time magazine stated that "this cycle of rock songs is an explosion of surprises, blending fey whimsy with just plain loony-bin clowning."

In the wake of the album's commercial failure Terry went solo, releasing three albums as a singer/songwriter, while John reappeared as a member of the short-lived Hamilton Streetcar before turning his attention to production with the Eagles, Linda Ronstadt, and others. Three of the songs on the album - "I Wonder If Louise Is Home", "Don't Blame It on Your Wife", and "Barefoot Boy" - were released before by Ricky Nelson on his 1967 album Another Side of Rick, in which both the Boylan brothers were involved.

Playback was reissued on CD in 2007, with the different cover of the UK re-release from 1972.

== Track listing ==
The Altogether Overture

1. ...In the Beginning...
2. Hightower Square (3.16)

Act I

1. Lullaby (0.25)
2. Saturday Morning (1.53)
3. Nevertheless It Was Italy (2.15)

Act II

1. I Wonder If Louise Is Home (2.10)
2. Chez Louise (1.02)
3. "E" Train (1:00)
4. Meanwhile (0.15)
5. Brother Speed (3.15)
6. You're the Biggest Thing in My Life (3.35)

Act III

1. Don't Blame It on Your Wife (2.50)
2. The Sorry State of Staying Awake (3.54)

Epilogue

1. Barefoot Boy (2.43)
2. Lotus Flower (2.16)
3. What a Way to Go (2.50)

All compositions by John and Terry Boylan

== Musicians ==
- John Boylan
- Terry Boylan
- Larry Coryell
- Chuck Rainey
- Herbie Lovelle
- Chuck Israels
- Paul Griffin
- Eric Gale
- Buddy Saltzman
- Michael Equine
- Zal Yanovsky
