= Sherwood Consort =

American early music group

The Sherwood Consort is an American early music group, founded in Berkeley, California, in 1995, and specializing in medieval music, particularly of England. The director is Mary Devlin. The vocal director and vocal coach for several of their recordings was Renée Fladen-Kamm.

== Discography ==
=== Between March & April (1997) ===
1	Say Me, Viit in the Brom, song	02:04
2	Ar ne kut ich sorghe non	03:33
3	I Must Go Walke, song	03:18
4	Stantipes	01:34
5	Me Lykyth Ever, song	00:56
6	Danger Me Hath, Unskyfully, song	01:05
7	I Rede That Thu Be Joly and Glad, song	01:06
8	Trewe, On Wham Is Al My Tryst, song	00:59
9	Ductiae	01:11
10	I Have Set Me Hert So Hy, song	01:30
11	Miri it is while sumer ilast, estampie	01:25
12	Worldes Blis Ne Last No Throwe	05:06
13	Ye Have So Longe Keepyt O, song	01:12
14	Nobilis humilis Magne martir	01:30
15	Dance for chamber ensemble	02:44
16	Fuweles in the Frith	01:03
17	Bryd one brere (Bird on a Briar), song	02:33
18	Gabriel fram evene king sewnt (Angelus ad Virginem)	04:38
19	Stantipes imperfecta, dance melody	01:09
20	Sumer is icumen in	02:05
21	Wynter Wakeneth Al My Care, song	02:16
22	Missal estampie, dance melody	03:50
23	Bituene Mersh and Averill (Between March and April), song	03:43

=== Robin Loves Me (1998) ===
1	Robin m'aime	00:53
2	Marion and the Knight	01:32
3	Robin and Marion's Love Duet	02:14
4	Robin, par l'ame ten pere	01:32
5	J'ai encore un tel pasté	00:38
6	Donne moy, song	01:50
7	Et je ferai, song	02:16
8	Les un pin verdoiant, dance	05:46
9	Prenes l'arbre, song	02:16
10	Lai de la pastourelle, song	02:20
11	L' autre jour / Hier matinet / Ite missa est, motet	01:15
12	Par un matinet / Hé, sire! / Hé, bergier! / Eius, motet in 4 pieces	02:16
13	Volez voux que je vous chant, song	03:22
14	Il n'a en toi / Robins, il malvais / Omnes, motet	00:39

=== One Day as I Went Riding (2002) ===
1	Mor a Cheannaich	01:35
2	Ecco la Primavera	00:57
3	Gabriel from Heven-King	04:38
4	Dame Playsans	01:04
5	A Robyn, Gentil Robyn	01:57
6	Giovine Donna Vidi Star	03:41
7	Cantiga de Santa Maria #1	01:11
8	Cantiga de Santa Maria #166	00:53
9	Cantiga de Santa Maria #181	01:17
10	Bryd One Brere	02:33
11	Com' a Seguir	02:11
12	Et Je Ferai	02:16
13	Fuweles in the Frith	01:03
14	Jamais, Nuill Temps	06:30
15	Pensis, Chief Enclin	00:44
16	Pensis, Chief Enclin	00:58
17	L'Autre Jour-Hier Matinet-Ite Missa Est	01:15
18	O Virtus Sapientie	02:55
19	Par un Matinet-Hé, Bergiers! -Eius	02:16
20	Reis Glorios	06:55
21	The Twa Corbies	02:38
22	Robin Is to the Greenwood Gone	02:38
23	Joie et Solas-Jonete Sui-Eius	01:11
24	Miraculous, Love's Wounding	04:48
