= Wantagh Senior High School =

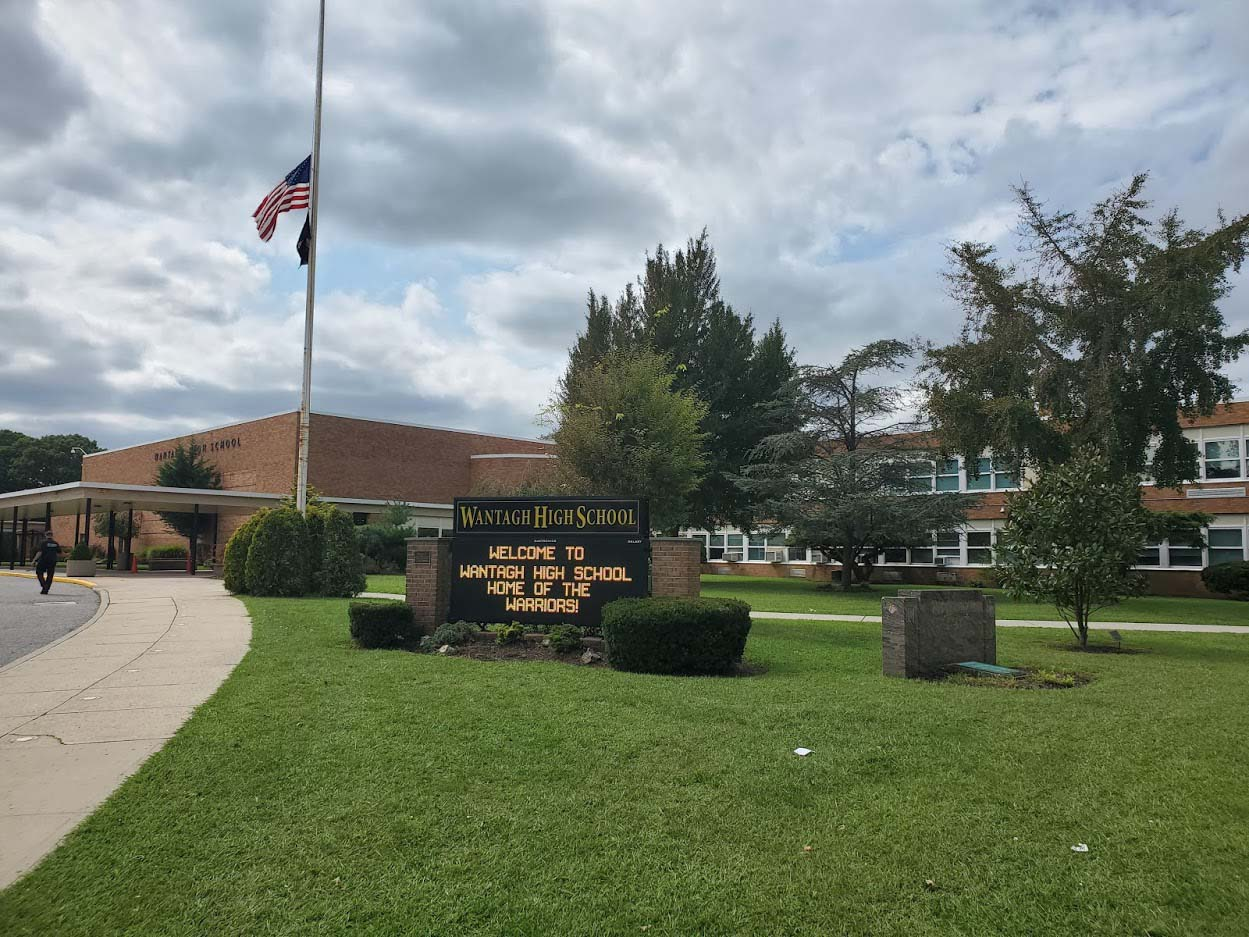
- The south-facing exterior of Wantagh Senior High School

Location
- 3301 Beltagh Avenue; Wantagh, Nassau County, New York; United States; 40.689652°N 73.512853°W

Information
- Type: Comprehensive Public High School
- Motto: “Home of the Warriors!”
- Opened: 1954
- Status: Open
- School board: Wantagh Board of Education
- School district: Wantagh Union Free School District
- Superintendent: John C. McNamara
- CEEB code: 335765
- Principal: Paul M. Guzzone
- Teaching staff: 74.31 (FTE)
- Grades: 9–12
- Enrollment: 833 (2023–2024)
- Student to teacher ratio: 11.21
- Hours in school day: 6.7
- Campus type: Suburban
- Colors: Black and gold
- Mascot: Warrior
- Team name: Warriors
- Rival: MacArthur High School
- Accreditation: Blue Ribbon: 1998; 2020
- Website: WHS (Homepage)

Wantagh High School is a secondary state school located in Wantagh, New York. The school is part of the Wantagh Union Free School District. Wantagh Senior High School is a two-time National Blue Ribbon School — a designation awarded annually by the United States Department of Education to high-performing American schools. Readings of college and career readiness amongst students at the high school measured “far above” the New York state average. The school caters to students in grades 9-12 and boasts a 99% graduation rate.

== History ==
=== 19th century ===
Jerusalem (the original name of the area now known as “Wantagh”) was a farming village in the late 1800s. In 1876, families of the farming village of Jerusalem began expressing the need for a schoolhouse so that the children of the village could receive an education. A section of land north of Jerusalem Avenue, originally a section of John Birdsall Garner's farm, was acquired by the village and designated to be the area of land where a one-room-schoolhouse would be built. Later, two additional rooms were added in the front section of the building facing Wantagh Ave. The original schoolhouse as it stands today, is an official Town of Hempstead landmark and the building is used as a Pre-K facility.

=== 20th century ===
In 1928, residents of Wantagh approved for $230,000.00 in bonds to be designated to the construction of a school at Walters Avenue and Cypress Street. The school was built as an eight-classroom building, and it was later called the “Sunrise Park school”. However, after many decades of use, the building was demolished in 1989 due to a shrinking student population and the construction of houses took over the space where it once stood.

The demand for housing grew exponentially in Wantagh and surrounding neighborhoods following World War II. The student population in Wantagh grew from 860 students to 1334 students between the years 1949 and 1950. Faculty were forced to use a split session schedule due to the large and unexpected number of new students.

In 1952, the citizens of Wantagh approved the purchase of a plot of land located on Beltagh Avenue near the Wantagh Parkway to construct a high school. The residents of Wantagh simultaneously approved $3,000,000.00 to be designated to the construction of the building that was to become Wantagh Senior High School. Students began attending Wantagh High School in the fall of 1954.

Construction of the new high school was completed the following year.

=== 21st century ===
In November 2022, the New York State Education Department acted to enforce a two-decade old memorandum urging public schools to drop Native American inspired mascots. Funding will be cut to schools that do not comply by the end of the 2022–2023 school year. Wantagh Senior High School, having a mascot inspired by Natives, first considered changing their mascot name. But instead voted upon the imagery in their logo instead, keeping "Warrior" as their mascot. Following this change, the school logo has become a yellow "W" to reflect both the town's and school mascot's name.

== Notable staff ==
- John Hampson — English teacher at Wantagh Senior High School and lead vocalist of the alternative rock band Nine Days

== Notable alumni ==
- Rob Cesternino, reality television contestant and podcast host
- Al Iaquinta, wrestler; professional MMA fighter in the UFC
- Trent Kowalik, Tony Award-winning star of Billy Elliot the Musical
- Lonny Ross, actor and comedian, 30 Rock
- Scott Schinder, music journalist and historian
