= Standing in the Shadows of Love =

- Norwegian picture sleeve

Single by Four Tops

from the album Reach Out
- B-side: "Since You've Been Gone"
- Released: November 28, 1966
- Recorded: October 19, 1966
- Studio: Hitsville U.S.A. (Studio A), Detroit
- Genre: Soul, pop, psychedelic soul
- Length: 2:36
- Label: Motown
- Songwriter: Holland–Dozier–Holland
- Producers: Brian Holland; Lamont Dozier

Four Tops singles chronology
"Reach Out I'll Be There" (1966)	"Standing in the Shadows of Love" (1966)	"Bernadette" (1967)

"Standing in the Shadows of Love" is a 1966 hit single recorded by the Four Tops for the Motown label. Written and produced by Motown's main production team Holland–Dozier–Holland, the song is one of the best-known Motown tunes of the 1960s. A direct follow-up to the #1 hit "Reach Out I'll Be There" (even featuring a similar musical arrangement), "Standing in the Shadows of Love" reached #2 on the soul chart and #6 on the Billboard Hot 100 in 1967. It also reached #6 in the UK.

== Recording and release ==
The vocals were recorded on October 13 1966 at Golden World. Further recording and dubbing took place with the song ready for release by November 7. It was finally released in the U.S. on November 28 1966. In the UK the release was delayed until January 6 1967 just before the group were about to commence a twice-nightly, nine date tour.

== Critical reception ==
Though the song was well-received, it has received some criticism. Author Martin Charles Strong notes that it rehashed the formula of "Reach Out I'll Be There" and achieved similar success by reaching the Top 10 in both the US and UK. It is ranked #470 on Rolling Stone's list of The 500 Greatest Songs of All Time in 2010 and #464 in 2004.

AllMusic critic John Bush calls "Standing in the Shadows of Love" "dramatic" and "impassioned." Billboard described the song as a "solid rhythm rocker headed fast for the top." Cash Box said the single is a "driving ode [that] is filled with a solid romance lyric in the quartet’s usual powerful style." Record World praised the "torrid rhythms." Critic Andrew Hamilton calls it a "memorable, unforgettable, timeless blast" which would have made Motown "notable" even if it was the only song Motown ever produced. Hamilton remarks on the song's power to conjure up "mournful" emotions, and particularly highlights the coldness of lyrics such as "standing in the shadows of love getting ready for the heartaches to come." Hamilton praises the intensity of Levi Stubbs' lead vocal and how it can make the listener believe that he is about to have a nervous breakdown. Music critic Maury Dean describes the singer as waiting for his girlfriend to dump him and psyching himself for the blow and for getting ready for a new girlfriend. He uses the metaphor of Wile E. Coyote to describe the singer's emotions as he waits for the "anvil to drop on his fervent love."

According to author Peter Benjaminson, "Standing in the Shadows of Love" is a reworked version of The Supremes' 1963 song "Standing at the Crossroads of Love", which was released as the B-side of their single "When the Lovelight Starts Shining Through His Eyes".

== Personnel ==
- Lead vocals by Levi Stubbs
- Background vocals by Abdul "Duke" Fakir, Renaldo "Obie" Benson, Lawrence Payton, and the Andantes: Jackie Hicks, Marlene Barrow, and Louvain Demps
- Instrumentation by the Funk Brothers
