= Bernadette (Four Tops song) =

Single by Four Tops

from the album Reach Out
- B-side: "I Got a Feeling"
- Released: February 16, 1967
- Recorded: Hitsville U.S.A. (Studio A); January 25, 1967
- Genre: Soul, pop
- Length: 3:00
- Label: Motown
- Songwriter: Holland–Dozier–Holland
- Producers: Brian Holland; Lamont Dozier

Four Tops singles chronology
| "Standing in the Shadows of Love" (1966) | "Bernadette" (1967) | "7 Rooms of Gloom" (1967) |

"Bernadette" is a 1967 hit song recorded by the Four Tops for the Motown label. The song was written and composed by Holland–Dozier–Holland, Motown's main songwriting team, and produced by Brian Holland and Lamont Dozier.

Billboard described the song as a "hard-driving rocker" with an "outstanding performance by the group." Cash Box called the single a "pulsating Detroit lid underscored by that steady, danceable rhythm." The song reached #4 on the Billboard Hot 100, #8 on the Cash Box Top 100. On the R&B chart, "Bernadette" went to #3.. It also reached #8 in the UK and was a hit again in 1972, reaching #23.

The song is notable for its false ending, where the instruments drop out and the background singers hold a chord. Lead singer Levi Stubbs then shouts "Bernadette!" and the song resumes, ending in a fade-out. Critic Maury Dean described the effectiveness of Stubb's shout of "Bernadette!" as being the key ingredient in getting listeners to buy the record, even if Bernadette herself may not have heard him.

AllMusic critic John Bush calls it "dramatic" and "impassioned."

== Personnel ==
- Lead vocals by Levi Stubbs
- Background vocals by Abdul "Duke" Fakir, Renaldo "Obie" Benson, Lawrence Payton, and the Andantes: Jackie Hicks, Marlene Barrow, and Louvain Demps
- Instrumentation by the Funk Brothers
- Written and composed by Brian Holland, Lamont Dozier, and Edward Holland, Jr.
- Produced by Brian Holland and Lamont Dozier
