= Pretty Ballerina =

1966 single by The Left Banke

Single by the Left Banke

from the album Walk Away Renée/Pretty Ballerina
- B-side: "Lazy Day"
- Released: December 1966
- Recorded: November 1966
- Studio: World United, New York City
- Genre: Baroque pop; art pop
- Length: 2:41
- Label: Smash
- Songwriter: Michael Brown
- Producers: Harry Lookofsky; Steve Jerome; Bill Jerome

The Left Banke singles chronology
"Walk Away Renée" (1966)	"Pretty Ballerina" (1966)	"Ivy Ivy" (1967)

"Pretty Ballerina" is a song written by pianist Michael Brown that was released as a single by his band The Left Banke in December 1966. It peaked at number 15 on the Billboard Hot 100 chart and number 4 on the Canadian RPM chart.

== Composition ==
"Pretty Ballerina" was one of the first pop songs to use the Lydian mode in its melody (more specifically the acoustic scale), predating the Beatles' Indian-inspired "Blue Jay Way" and Donovan's "Peregrine". The recording features an oboe over the instrumental portion of the track, joining the string quartet, before the music pauses, and goes back to the refrain of the song.

The original Left Banke version of the song was sung by Steve Martin Caro and it is one of several songs that Brown wrote about singer Renee Fladen, the girlfriend of Left Banke guitarist Tom Finn and the object of Brown's affections. Other songs written about her include the band's biggest hit, "Walk Away Renée", and "She May Call You Up Tonight".

== Personnel ==
Personnel courtesy of band biographer Scott Schinder.

Musicians

- Steve Martin-Caro – lead vocals
- Michael Brown – piano
- John Abbott – bass guitar
- Seymour Barab – bass guitar, cello
- Buddy Saltzman – drums
- Harry Lookofsky – violin
- George Marge – oboe

Technical

- Harry Lookofsky – producer
- Steve Jerome – producer, engineer
- Bill Jerome – producer
- John Abbott – arranger

== Chart performance ==
=== Weekly charts ===
Chart (1967)	Peak position
Canada RPM Top Singles	4
New Zealand (Listener)	13
U.S. Billboard Hot 100	15
U.S. Cash Box Top 100	12

=== Year-end charts ===
Chart (1967)	Rank
U.S. (Joel Whitburn's Pop Annual)	149

== Cover versions ==
- Alice Cooper Pretty Ballerina was covered by Alice Cooper in his 2005 studio album, Dirty Diamonds.
- John Mellencamp
- Jason Falkner
- Peter Kingsbery
- Eels
- Charly García
- Alan Merrill
- the Bluetones
- the Dickies
- Elio e le Storie Tese

== Popular culture ==
The song has appeared in the films: Apocalypse Now, Off Limits and Things Behind the Sun.
