= Ian Lloyd (musician) =

American rock singer and songwriter (born 1947)

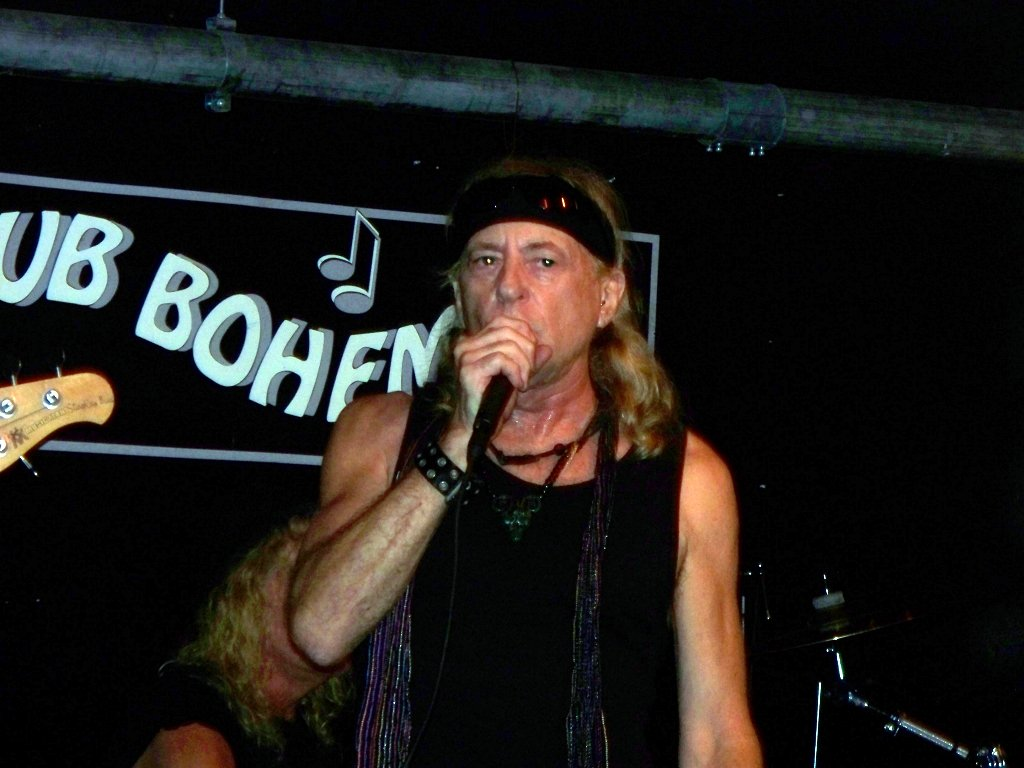
- Lloyd performing in 2011

Background information
- Born: Lloyd Buonconsiglio; July 19, 1947 (age 78)
- Origin: Seattle, Washington, United States
- Genres: Rock; pop
- Occupations: Singer, songwriter, musician
- Instruments: Vocals; guitar; bass; keyboards
- Website: www.machinedreamrecords.com

Lloyd Buonconsiglio, known professionally as Ian Lloyd, (born July 19, 1947) is an American rock singer and songwriter best known as the lead singer of the band Stories. The band's single "Brother Louie" rose to No. 1 on the U.S. Billboard Hot 100 chart in August 1973.

In 1971, Michael Brown and Ian Lloyd formed Stories. They released two albums (Stories and About Us) with a handful of Billboard Top 100 charting singles. Brown left before the band recorded their third (and final) album, Traveling Underground, which was released under the name, Ian Lloyd and Stories, and included the Billboard #50 hit "Mammy Blue". After Stories, he pursued a solo career, with six albums to his credit. Lloyd has performed with numerous recording artists, assuming the role of a session musician. Lloyd continues to record, perform, and write, his most recent release being Everybody's Happy 'Cause It's Christmas Time.

== Stories ==
Although Lloyd was classically trained on both piano and violin, he first reached international acclaim as lead singer and bassist for the band Stories, formed with Michael Brown of the Left Banke in the early 1970s. Lloyd sang lead on Stories' songs like "I'm Coming Home" (played as an anthem during the return of the Iranian hostages), "Mammy Blue" and "Brother Louie". A re-recorded version of the latter with Lloyd on vocals is used as the theme song for Louis CK's comedy series Louie.

Rolling Stone praised Lloyd's songwriting, saying he displayed "a lyricist's most essential gift — the ability to produce a verbal approximation of the music's ambiance."

== The Ian Lloyd Band and Social Hero ==
In addition to projects of his own, Ian has worked with The Ian Lloyd Band with Dan Natelli on guitar (1995–2010) recording two CDs, Planet X and O-de-Poe. Ian Lloyd has been a member of New York rock act Social Hero since 1998, performing alongside his son, frontman David Lloyd. He contributed vocals to Social Hero's first album, The Famous, released in 2009.

== Other work ==
He wrote a song for Elkie Brooks's 1975 album, Rich Man's Woman.

== Discography ==
=== Albums ===
==== Solo albums ====
- 1976 Ian Lloyd (Polydor)
- 1979 Goose Bumps (Scotti Bros. Records)
  - 1979 Love Stealer (Scotti Bros. Records, Japan version of "Goose Bumps")
- 1980 3WC* (a.k.a. "Third Wave Civilization") (Scotti Bros. Records)
- 1997 Planet X (Efa Records)
- 2009 In The Land of O-de-Po (Machine Dream)

==== With Stories ====
- 1972 Stories (Kama Sutra) #182 released June 1972
- 1973 About Us (Kama Sutra) #29 (charted after it was reissued with "Brother Louie" added to the end of side two)
- 1973 Traveling Underground (Kama Sutra) #208

==== With Fast Forward ====
- 1984 Living in Fiction

=== Singles ===
==== Solo singles ====
- 1976 "Never Been A Man" b/w "Silver Chains" (Polydor)
- 1976 "Oh Let Me In" b/w "Sensations" (Polydor)
- 1976 "Silver Chains" b/w "Never Been A Man" (Polydor, New Zealand release)
- 1979 "She Broke Your Heart" b/w "Easy Money" (Scotti Bros. Records)
- 1979 "Slip Away" b/w "Easy Money" (Scotti Bros. Records)
- 1979 "Goosebumps" b/w "Slip Away" (Scotti Bros. Records)
- 1979 "Love Stealer" b/w "Slip Away" (Scotti Bros. Records)
- 1980 "Do You Wanna Touch (Oh Yeah)" b/w "Stop In The Name Of Love" (Scotti Bros. Records)
- 1980 "Straight From The Heart" b/w "Third Wave Civilization" (Scotti Bros. Records)
- 1983 "Stop In The Name Of Love" b/w "Dedicated To You" (Scotti Bros. Records, Germany release)
- 2010 "Everybody's Happy 'Cause It's Christmas Time" (Machine Dream)

==== With Stories ====
- 1972 "I'm Coming Home" b/w "You Told Me" (Kama Sutra 545) #42
- 1972 "Top of the City" b/w "Step Back" (Kama Sutra 558)
- 1973 "Darling"(see below) b/w "Take Cover" (Kama Sutra 566) #111
- 1973 "Love Is In Motion" b/w "Changes Have Begun" (Kama Sutra 574)
- 1973 "Brother Louie" b/w "What Comes After?" (Kama Sutra 577) #1
- 1973 "Mammy Blue" b/w "Travelling Underground" (Kama Sutra 584) #50
- 1974 "If It Feels Good, Do It" b/w "Circles" (Kama Sutra 588) #88
- 1974 "Another Love" b/w "Love Is In Motion" (Kama Sutra 594)
