= Another Love (Stories song) =

Single by Stories
- B-side: "Love Is in Motion"
- Released: 1974
- Genre: Pop, rock
- Label: Kama Sutra
- Songwriters: Bobby Flax; Larry Lambert
- Producers: Kenny Kerner; Richie Wise

Stories singles chronology
"If It Feels Good, Do It" (1974)	"Another Love" (1974)

"Another Love" is a song by American band Stories, released on 18 October 1974. The song was written by Bobby Flax and Larry Lambert (who also wrote "All I Need Is Your Sweet Lovin'" for Gloria Gaynor) and produced by Kenny Kerner and Richie Wise. The bisexual theme of the song proved controversial, and the band disbanded the following year.
