= The Appletree Theatre =

American musical group

- Genres: Rock
- Occupation: Vocal group

The Appletree Theatre was a studio group of American musicians who released the album Playback in 1967.

The project was set up by brothers Terry and John Boylan, with leading jazz session musicians including Larry Coryell and Eric Gale. The album was essentially a loosely woven concept album, comprising a collage of interlaced vocal narratives, sound effects, song fragments, and pop songs such as "Hightower Square" and "I Wonder If Louise Is Home". It was issued on the Verve Forecast label and was finally reissued on CD in 2007. John Lennon referred to it as one of his favourite albums.

In the wake of the set's commercial failure, Terry went solo, releasing three albums as a singer-songwriter, while John reappeared as a member of the short-lived Hamilton Streetcar, before turning his attention to production with the Eagles, Linda Ronstadt, and others.
