= Tom Finn (singer) =

American musician and DJ (1948–2020)

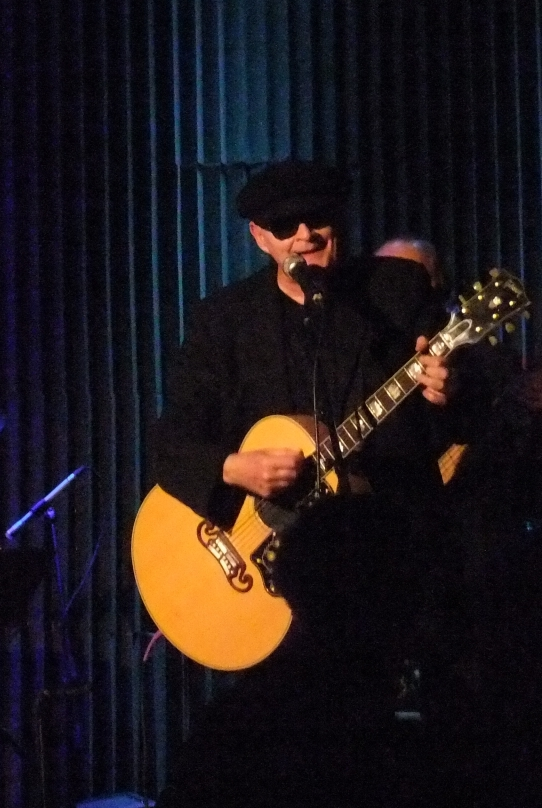
- Finn taking the stage with the Left Banke's reunion tour on July 6, 2012.

Background information
- Born: Thomas Joseph Finn; November 21, 1948; New York City, U.S.
- Died: June 27, 2020 (aged 71)
- Genres: Baroque pop; pop; jazz
- Occupations: Singer, songwriter, musician, DJ
- Instruments: Vocals; guitar; bass
- Years active: 1965–2020
- Formerly of: The Left Banke. The Magic Plants

Thomas Joseph Finn (November 21, 1948 – June 27, 2020) was an American musician and DJ. He was a founding member of the 1960s baroque pop group The Left Banke, on bass and vocals.

== Musical career ==
At age sixteen, Finn was a founder member of The Left Banke in Manhattan, New York City in 1965, alongside Michael Brown, Steve Martin, George Cameron and Lisa David-Schierhorst. The members of the group were all members of other groups, but were put together by Harry Lookofsky, a jazz violinist who was the father to Michael Lookofsky, known as Michael Brown, who was the band's keyboardist.

After initial success with the songs "Walk Away Renée" and "Pretty Ballerina", the group split up, though Finn was involved in later reformations of the band. "Walk Away Renée", along with many other songs released by the Left Banke, were inspired by Renée Fladen-Kamm, who at the time was Finn's girlfriend.

After the Left Banke disbanded, Finn went on to become an engineer at Bell Sound Studios, as well as working with jazz drummer Buddy Rich at Rich's night club Buddy's Place as stage manager and MC. Finn returned to the Left Banke for reunions in 1971, 1978, and 2011.

== Disc jockey career ==
In 1982, Studio 54 owner Steve Rubell convinced Finn to try his hand as a DJ. This led to Finn working at NY clubs such as The Palladium, The Red Zone, and Au Bar. In the 1990s Finn began working as a DJ for private events, resulting in his own company, Topspin Entertainment.

He played at the 1995 wedding of Pavlos, Crown Prince of Greece and Marie-Chantal, Crown Princess of Greece.

Finn was the DJ for the White House Millennium Gala, hosted by President Bill Clinton and Hillary Clinton.

In 2006, he appeared in the November issue of Town & Country magazine in a five-page spread called "The Party Masters". Finn was featured in a New York Times (December 16, 2006) article "The D.J. Who Moves the Movers and Shakers". It was said that Finn played on average 70 nights a year, and charged $5,000–12,000 a gig.

== Death ==
Finn died on June 27, 2020, after a period of ill health. He was the last surviving member of the original The Left Banke, as Michael Brown died in 2015, George Cameron died in 2018, and Steve Martin Caro died five months before Finn, in January 2020.
