= Walk Away Renée =

1966 single by the Left Banke

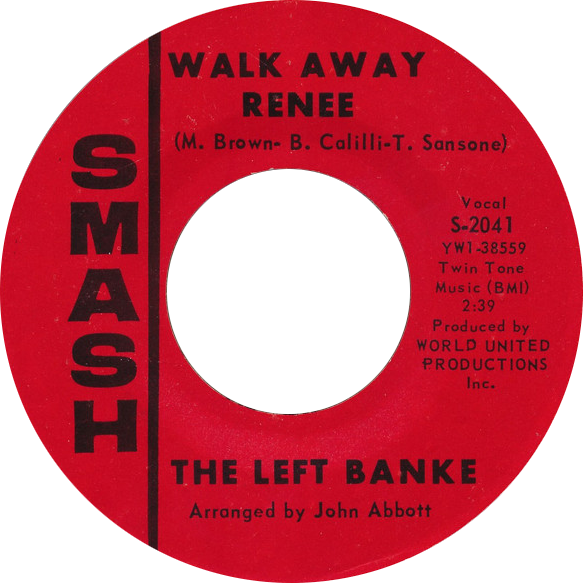
- One of label variants of the US single

Single by the Left Banke

from the album Walk Away Renée/Pretty Ballerina
- B-side: "I Haven't Got the Nerve"
- Released: July 1966
- Recorded: March 1966
- Studio: World United, New York City
- Genre: Baroque pop; psychedelic pop; orchestral pop; pop rock
- Length: 2:43
- Label: Smash
- Songwriters: Michael Brown; Bob Calilli; Tony Sansone
- Producers: Harry Lookofsky; Bill Jerome; Steve Jerome

The Left Banke singles chronology
"Walk Away Renée" (1966)	"Pretty Ballerina" (1966)

"Walk Away Renée" is a song written by Michael Brown, Bob Calilli, and Tony Sansone for the band the Left Banke, released as a single in July 1966. Steve Martin Caro is featured on lead vocals. It spent 13 weeks on the US charts, with a top spot of No. 5. The song has been widely considered a quintessence of the baroque pop genre. As musician Marshall Crenshaw explained, "There's something about 'Walk Away Renee' that's one of the most powerful songs I've ever heard, just in terms of provoking an emotional reaction."

In 2005, Rolling Stone placed it at No. 220 in the 500 Greatest Songs of All Time. The track returned to nationwide charts with cover versions by the Four Tops (1967), Southside Johnny and the Jukes (1986) and Rick Price (1993). It also featured on the Rickie Lee Jones 1983 EP, "Girl at Her Volcano".

== Background ==
Michael Brown has stated that the song is one of a number he wrote about Renée Fladen (later Fladen-Kamm), the then-girlfriend of the Left Banke's bassist Tom Finn and object of Brown's affection. She was associated with the band for a few weeks, and was described as a free-spirited and tall blonde. Brown wrote it one month after he met her. "Walk Away Renée" was one of a series of love songs the infatuated Brown wrote for his muse. Other works about her include the band's second hit "Pretty Ballerina" and "She May Call You Up Tonight". After decades of obscurity, she was identified in 2001 as a noted singer, vocal teacher, and artist on the West Coast.

According to band member Tom Finn:

A bunch of teens got an apartment together around Tin Pan Alley, in the Broadway area, and Renee lived there part time when she wasn't living with her mother. Most of the kids were like half runaways in those days, and there was a "crash pad" there, as we used to call it. I guess I brought her to the studio one day where Michael met her and fell in love with her.

Brown says of his unrequited love for Renée:

I was just sort of mythologically in love, if you know what I mean, without having evidence in fact or in deed ... But I was as close as anybody could be to the real thing.

Renée was looking on during the recording of the song, and her presence nearly prevented its completion. In an interview, Brown stated:

My hands were shaking when I tried to play, because she was right there in the control room ... There was no way I could do it with her around, so I came back and did it later.

However, co-writer Tony Sansone has given a different version of the origin of the song and contends that he is the primary writer. Sansone has stated in interviews that he wrote the lyrics, and he randomly chose the name Renée because the Beatles used the name "Michelle" in their hit song of the same name; he likewise chose a French name, Renée.

== Composition ==
The song features an alto flute solo played during the instrumental bridge of the middle portion of the song. Brown was inspired to add it by the Mamas & the Papas song "California Dreamin'" which had been recorded in November 1965, but was not an immediate hit until early 1966. The arrangement for "Walk Away Renée " also includes a lush string orchestration, a jangling harpsichord part, and a descending chromatic bass melody. Its production was credited to World United Productions, Inc., but the session was produced by brothers Bill and Steve Jerome, along with Brown's father, jazz and classical violinist Harry Lookofsky, who also led the string players. The session took place in March 1966.

=== Personnel ===
Musicians

- Al Rogers – drums
- John Abbott – bass
- George (Fluffer) Hirsh – guitar
- Michael Brown – harpsichord
- Friends – strings
- Jackie Kelso [uncredited] – flute
- John Abbott – arranger
- Steve Martin Caro – lead vocal
- George Cameron & Tom Finn – backing vocals

Technical

- Steve Jerome – producer, engineer
- Harry Lookofsky – producer, strings
- Bill Jerome – producer

== Chart performance ==
=== Weekly charts ===
Chart (1966)	Peak position
Canada Top Singles (RPM)	3
New Zealand (Listener)	5
US Billboard Hot 100	5
US Cash Box Top 100	2

Year-end charts

Chart (1966)	Rank
US Billboard Hot 100	40
CAN RPM	51

== Four Tops cover ==
"Walk Away Renée"
- Solid centre variant of the UK single

Single by the Four Tops

from the album Reach Out
- B-side: "Your Love Is Wonderful"
- Released: January 18, 1968
- Length: 2:42
- Label: Motown
- Songwriters: Michael Brown, Bob Calilli, Tony Sansone
- Producer: Holland–Dozier–Holland

The Four Tops singles chronology
"You Keep Running Away" (1967)	"Walk Away Renée" (1968)	"If I Were a Carpenter" (1968)

The Four Tops' recording was featured on their 1967 album Reach Out and is the second most successful cover version, having reached number 15 on the soul singles chart, number 14 on the Billboard Hot 100, and charting higher than the Left Banke in Canada at number 2 on the RPM Magazine charts. Overseas, it peaked at number 3 on the UK Singles Chart and number 5 in the Irish Singles Chart in January 1968. The Andantes provided backing vocals on this Motown release in unison with the other Tops. Record World called it a "pretty version" of the song. Billboard called it "an exciting rock ballad" and said that the "driving vocal workout and exciting production will hit hard and fast."

=== Personnel ===
- Lead vocals by Levi Stubbs
- Background vocals by Obie Benson, Duke Fakir, Lawrence Payton, and the Andantes
- Instrumentation by the Funk Brothers

=== Chart performance ===
==== Weekly charts ====
Chart (1968)	Peak position
Canada Top Singles (RPM)	2
Ireland (IRMA)	5
UK Singles (Official Charts)	3
US Billboard Hot 100	14
US Billboard R&B/Soul	15
West Germany (GfK)	31

==== Year-end charts ====
Chart (1968)	Rank
Canada	78
UK	82
US (Joel Whitburn's Pop Annual)	113

== Rick Price version ==
"Walk Away Renee"

Single by Rick Price

from the album Heaven Knows
- B-side: "We've Got Each Other"
- Released: May 3, 1993
- Length: 4:26
- Label: Columbia
- Songwriters: Michael Brown, Bob Calilli, Tony Sansone
- Producer: Chris Lord-Alge

Rick Price singles chronology
"A House Divided" (1993)	"Walk Away Renee" (1993)	"Where Is the Love" (1993)

In May 1993, "Walk Away Renée" was released by Australian singer-songwriter Rick Price as the fifth single from his debut studio album, Heaven Knows. The song peaked at number 21 in Australia and number 52 in Germany.

=== Weekly charts ===
Chart (1993)	Peak position
Australia (ARIA)	21
Germany (GfK)	52
