= Harry Lookofsky =

American jazz violinist (1913–1998)

Harry William Lookofsky (1 October 1913 – 8 June 1998) was an American jazz violinist. He was also the father of keyboardist-songwriter Michael Brown, who most notably was a founding member of the Left Banke and Stories.

== Early life and family ==
Harry Lookofsky was born in Paducah, Kentucky, in 1913, the son of Ben Lookofsky and Lottie Dinkin, Jewish emigrants from the Russian Empire.

He studied classical violin in St. Louis.

== Career ==
Lookofsky joined the St. Louis Symphony Orchestra in the mid-1930s. An early admirer of Joe Venuti, Lookofsky eventually became recognized as one of the earliest accomplished bebop jazz violinists. His technique became particularly recognized on his album Stringsville (1959, Atlantic). Lookofsky was one of many early jazz violinists who occasionally played tenor violin, an instrument he cited for its similar tonal qualities to the tenor saxophone. Another relatively unknown unique characteristic about Lookofsky's playing is that the bebop solos on Stringsville were completely written out and arranged as opposed to improvised as most jazz musicians do. An accomplished studio musician, Lookofsky also experimented heavily with multitrack recording in order to produce a unique sound with several overlaid violin tracks meant to imitate the sound of a horn section in a big band orchestra.

Following his departure from St. Louis in 1938, Lookofsky joined the NBC Symphony Orchestra under Arturo Toscanini for a time while continuing to play jazz on the side. He continued his career as a classical symphony violinist later as concertmaster at ABC following Toscanini's retirement in 1954.

Stringsville was Lookofsky's one major feature release. Aside from his classical and studio recording work, he was more often a contributing artist and/or arranger on others' albums. Over the years, his many jazz collaborators included Quincy Jones, Jaco Pastorius, Sarah Vaughan, George Benson, and Freddie Hubbard.

Lookofsky co-produced the pop hit, "Walk Away Renée", by the Left Banke, which was co-written by his son, Michael Brown, a founding member of the group. The arrangement was heavily influenced by classical music. Lookofsky also played strings on songs recorded by Stories, his son Michael's later band.

Lookofsky's archives are held at the American Roots Program at Berklee School of Music in Boston.

== Selected discography ==
- Stringsville (1958, Atlantic)
- Together!/Miracle in Strings (1994 reissue, Columbia). Together! is an album by Herb Ellis and Stuff Smith

== Selected albums appeared on ==
- The Ballad Artistry of Milt Jackson (Atlantic, 1959) - Milt Jackson
- Heavenly (Johnny Mathis album) (Columbia, 1959) - Johnny Mathis
- Blues Shout (1960, Atlantic - Leo Wright)
- The Song Is Paris (1962, Impulse! - Jackie Paris)
- The Body & the Soul (1963, Impulse! - Freddie Hubbard)
- The Individualism of Gil Evans (1964, Verve - Gil Evans)
- Who Can I Turn To (Columbia, 1964 - Tony Bennett)
- Sarah Vaughn Sings the Mancini Songbook (1965, Verve - Sarah Vaughan)
- Wave (Antônio Carlos Jobim album) (A&M, 1967 - Antônio Carlos Jobim)
- Child Is Father to the Man (1968, Columbia - Blood, Sweat & Tears)
- Stone Flower (1970, CTI - Antônio Carlos Jobim)
- Smackwater Jack (1971, A&M Records - Quincy Jones)
- Marlena (1972, Blue Note - Marlena Shaw)
- Sophisticated Lou (1973, Blue Note - Lou Donaldson)
- Polar AC (1974, CTI - Freddie Hubbard)
- Night Lights (Elliott Murphy album) (1975, RCA - Elliott Murphy)
- Windjammer (1977, Columbia - Freddie Hubbard)
- Sounds...and Stuff Like That!! (1978, A&M Records - Quincy Jones)
- In Your Eyes (1978, Collectables - George Benson)
- "Collaboration" (1988 EmArcy, Helen Merrill / Gil Evans)
- Standards (1998, Rhino - Ray Charles)

== Sources ==
- "New Pop Records". Time. May 16, 1955. Archived from the original on December 15, 2008.
