= Michael Brown (rock musician) =

American singer-songwriter (1949–2015)

- Born: Michael David Lookofsky; April 25, 1949; New York City, US
- Died: March 19, 2015 (aged 65) Englewood, New Jersey, US
- Genres: Baroque pop, rock
- Instrument: Keyboards
- Years active: 1960s–2015
- Formerly of: The Left Banke, Stories

Michael Brown (born Michael David Lookofsky, April 25, 1949 – March 19, 2015) was an American keyboardist and songwriter, most notable for his work with the Left Banke. He was born in Brooklyn, New York, the son of violinist and arranger Harry Lookofsky.

== The Left Banke ==
Brown was the principal songwriter for the 1960s baroque-pop group the Left Banke, writing their two biggest hits, "Walk Away Renee" and "Pretty Ballerina". He also was a harpsichordist and clavinet player for the band. "Walk Away Renee" was also a top 20 hit for the Four Tops, having reached No. 15 on the soul singles chart, and No. 14 on the Billboard Hot 100.

Internal band tensions saw Brown leave the Left Banke in late 1967, prior to the completion of their second record. Brown, along with Bert Sommer, co-wrote the minor mid-1968 hit "And Suddenly", initially for Brown's version of the new Left Banke, with Sommer also slated as lead singer. The song went on to be recorded by The Cherry People, peaking at #45 single on the Billboard Hot 100. The flip side of the Left Banke version of the single was "Ivy, Ivy" written by Tom Feher. He briefly returned to the Left Banke, producing the single "Myrah" in 1969 and Left Banke vocalist Steve Martin Caro's solo single "Two By Two".

== Later career ==
In 1969, Brown became involved in the band Montage (again collaborating with Sommer and Feher in songwriting), as well as producing the band's self-titled album.

In 1971 Brown and vocalist Ian Lloyd formed Stories. They were introduced by their fathers, Peter Buonconsiglio and Harry Lookofsky, who had worked together as session violinists. A self-titled album and single – "I'm Coming Home" (No. 42, 1972) – followed.

The band recorded a second album About Us in (1973). Brown left the band prior to the recording of Hot Chocolate's "Brother Louie", which became a No. 1 hit for Stories in the US and Canada.

Subsequently, he became involved with The Beckies. Brown briefly reunited with the Left Banke at a New York performance in June 2013.

== Personal life and death ==
Michael David Lookofsky was born in New York City in 1949 to Betty and Harry Lookofsky (1913–1998), the latter a jazz violinist from St. Louis, Missouri, who was a member of the NBC Symphony Orchestra from c. 1938 to 1954.

Brown has a brother living in Denmark, by which he has a niece and nephew, Joseph Lookofsky. He also has several sisters, Jane, Mary (deceased), Susan, and another brother, named Peter.

He also has a step-mother, Sherry.

Brown attended a Christian school, Poly Prep, in the 1960's, before attending a different school.

While the Left Banke formed in New York City, Brown grew up in Brooklyn. Brown's father lived in the apartments at Seacoast Towers in Brighton Beach, a 7 story building located directly on the beach, near Coney Island Amusement Park. In Brown's later years, Brown lived in an apartment also in Brooklyn, Cass Place, and when he was moving out after years of being a tenant, his superintendent informed him a man had committed suicide in the same apartment. The superintendent let Michael know who the person was, and it turned out it was a childhood friend, Neil, with whom Michael had had a fight with, causing Neil to cut contact.

Unknown to Brown, his future wife, Yvonne, lived in the same building as his father. However, it wasn't until 1989, when his sister convinced Yvonne to meet him, as he "liked blonde girls" that they were introduced formally.

They married soon after, in April of 1990, and traveled around Europe and England. Together, they had two twin sons, (after 7 years of being married) Sklyer and Adrian, when Brown was in his late 40's. Following in their father's footsteps, Skyler plays the bass and piano, and Adrian the violin and piano. Some of the things he enjoyed doing with them were playing chess with Skyler, and watching Adrian dance, along with playing songs on piano with the former, such as the Superman theme song and songs from his time as part of Montage. Brown's favorite movie, according to Skyler, was North by Northwest and he enjoyed Alfred Hitchcock, finding movies very soothing. Brown also enjoyed music by Bert Sommer and occasionally, The Beatles.

Brown had Bipolar disorder, which caused him a great amount of anxiety. However, he converted to Christianity on July 8th, 2005, and recorded a video about his conversion two days later, stating: "I am talking right now, it is 4 o' clock in the afternoon, it's Saturday, and my coffee cup is full. I am satisfied. I am satisfied in my mind that everything is alright. I've come to know Christ as my Lord and savior.... and I feel content now, I don't feel riddled with anxiety like I have, since I was saved....There's nothing that could help me more than that revelation two days ago, a date that will live on and on as long as I am earthly alive."

Previously Jewish, as he was raised that way as a child, he came to reject that faith in favor of his new found one. Some comments he remarked about that event are: "Jesus Christ works. Anything else in religion that I've ever gone through except for my own personal prayers at night as a child... I prayed to the Jewish God, but you need Christ. You can't... there's something wrong with the Jewish thinking and I have seen a Jewish psychiatrist, although I haven't seen him in many months - thank God! But he said, he said "Michael" and I said "do you ever think about God" and he says "to tell you the truth I don't give it much thought." That's what he said, and it disappointed me, because I needed spiritual guidance... I needed someone to say: "Michael, God is real."

The video, which was recorded by Yvonne, surfaced on Youtube on May 17, 2015. Yvonne herself has a Youtube channel under her maiden name, Yvonne Vitale, on which she uploads Christian devotionals and reflections. Skyler also has his own channel, on which he has uploaded Left Banke content, called Left Banke Music.

The last time he performed with the Left Banke, Brown was so weak he had to be carried up the stairs to the performing platform, and back down again. However, he played his part on keyboard, marking a historical moment in which he was reunited with the Left Banke.

On March 19, 2015, Brown died at age 65 of heart failure in Englewood, New Jersey. He is survived by his aforementioned family, wife Yvonne Brown (nee’ Vitale) and twin sons, Skylar and Adrian. He was the first of the original four members of the Left Banke to pass away: George Cameron died in 2018, and Steve Martin Caro and Tom Finn both died in 2020.

His memorial service was held at a church, and Adrian, Yvonne, and other family and friends were in attendance. These included original Left Banke members George Cameron and Tom Finn. Adrian was the first to give a remembrance speech, providing much information about times with his father and colloquially addressing him throughout as "Daddy." Yvonne, Skyler, Tom Finn, Paul Doler, and his cousin, Max Weinberg, also gave speeches about Brown's life, totaling a service that was almost an hour and a half.

Sending their condolences were the Renée Fladen-Kamm, who was very sincere and hurt by the news, which was a shock to Finn, as she had not been heard from in 49 years, and Mary Weiss, from the Shangri-Las, (longtime friend of them both) who could not make it because she was in physical pain. Finn said she was "broken up and hysterical" due to the news.

== Trivia ==
- At his second school, he compulsively punched a bully who was following him, Eddie Ducan, knocking him out. Seeing what he had done, Brown uttered "oh no - I killed him!" However, Ducan soon opened his eyes and left him and the other students who he bullied alone, from that day forward.

- Weinberg fell out of touch with Brown until he was presented with a Left Banke record through his father, (Harry's second cousin), and realized it was the same child he had spent the summer with, who was on the cover. Weinberg used it (to the amusement of the crowd he was telling the story to) - to brag his way through high school and college. However, he never spoke to or saw Brown again.

== Selected discography ==
- Walk Away Renée/Pretty Ballerina, The Left Banke (1967)
- The Left Banke Too, The Left Banke (1968)

(See full discographies at The Left Banke and Stories)
