= The Left Banke =

American rock band

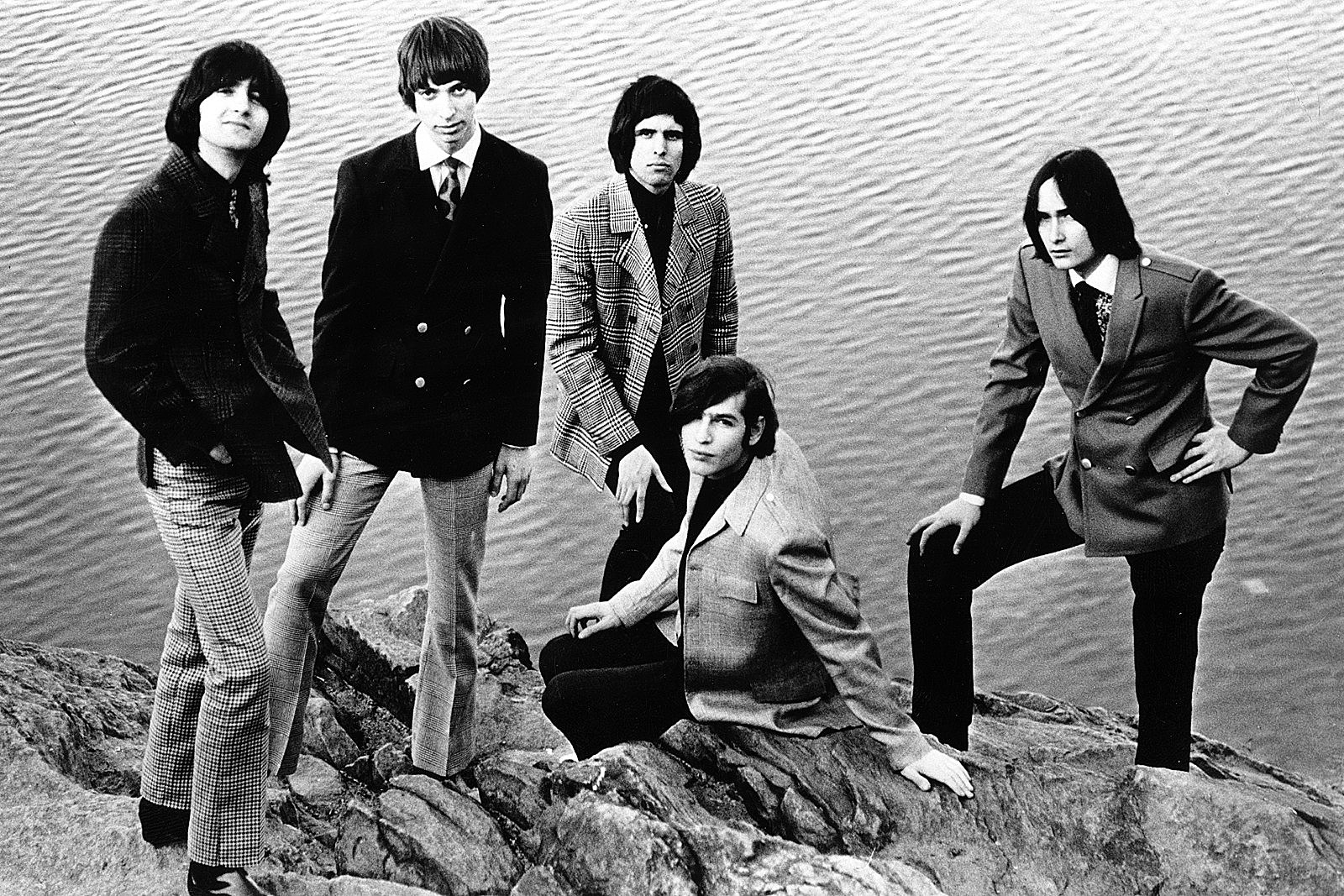
- The Left Banke in 1966. L–R: Steve Martin Caro, Michael Brown, George Cameron, Jeff Winfield and Tom Finn

Background information
- Origin: New York City, U.S.
- Genres: Baroque pop; psychedelic pop
- Years active: 1965–1969; 1971; 1978; 2011–2012; 2015
- Labels: Smash; Philips; Relix; Bam-Caruso; Rhino; Line; Mercury/PolyGram; Red Cap
- Past members: Tom Finn; George Cameron; Steve Martin Caro; Michael Brown; Lisa David-Schierhorst; Jeff Winfield; Rick Brand; Bert Sommer; Michael McKean; Tom Feher

The Left Banke was an American baroque pop band, formed in New York City in 1965. They are best remembered for their two U.S. hit singles, "Walk Away Renée" and "Pretty Ballerina". The band often used what the music press referred to as "baroque" string arrangements, which led to their music being variously termed as "Bach-rock", "baroque rock" or "baroque pop". The band's vocal harmonies borrowed from contemporaries such as the Beatles, the Zombies and other British Invasion groups.

In 2004, Rolling Stone placed "Walk Away Renée" at number 220 in its list of "The 500 Greatest Songs of All Time".

== History ==
=== 1965–69: early years and disbandment ===
The Left Banke was formed in 1965 and consisted of keyboard player/songwriter Michael Brown, drummer/singer George Cameron, bass guitarist/singer Tom Finn, singer Steve Martin (later known as Steve Martin Caro), and drummer Lisa (then known as Warren) David-Schierhorst.

The band formed among the world of session musicians in midtown Manhattan. Brown's father, Harry Lookofsky, was a well-known session violinist, and he owned and operated a recording studio on 48th Street called World United. In 1965 George Cameron's band the Morticians was recording there, and they were looking for new members. This attracted Tom Finn of the band the Magic Plants, who had previously worked at World United. Finn brought along a new acquaintance, Steve Martin (Caro), a musician he had met by chance in front of the City Squire Hotel after a Rolling Stones concert. Cameron and Martin both had songs they wanted to record, but these did not take shape until Lookofsky's son Michael Brown, 16 at the time, worked out arrangements for them on the studio's piano.

According to Finn:

We never had a plan to be a group, but Michael had the keys to his father's studio. I'd bring my girlfriend Renee along, and Michael fell for her, getting his heart broken, but writing these amazing melodies. Once Michael's father caught us in the studio and heard us, he wanted to get in on the action. That started things rolling but it was also the kiss of death.

Lookofsky realized that their music had commercial potential, and getting behind his son's songwriting talent he acted as producer, manager and publisher for the newly formed band. After some initial recording sessions, Lisa David-Schierhorst was ousted, with Cameron switching to drums and Jeff Winfield on guitar.

One of the main reasons Lisa David-Schierhorst was kicked out of the Left Banke was because she was a closeted transgender woman and also bisexual, and Harry Lookofsky didn't approve:

Well, Warren was bi-sexual, & Mike's father found out about that, & that was frowned upon. One thing that you couldn't be in those days was black or bisexual. Warren is now a transsexual, I understand. He's now named Lisa. I don't think Mike felt comfortable about Warren being a girl or thinking he was a girl. But at that same time Michael & Warren ran off to California together & sold Michael's coin collection, & Mike's father, being that Mike was a minor, had them stopped at the airport. We mentioned to Mike's father that Mike left for California, & he got right on the phone, found out what airplane they were getting on, what names they went under & he had them arrested when they reached California, thrown in prison, & then returned to New York.

— Tom Finn

Their first live show was at a church, Our Lady Of Solace in the Bronx, to an audience of about 1000 people.

The first recording Lookofsky sent to record labels was a proposed single consisting of "I've Got Something On My Mind" backed with "I Haven't Got The Nerve". He found no takers, but tried again with "Walk Away Renée". Out of about ten labels he sent it to, only one showed interest: Smash Records, a subsidiary of Mercury Records. The single was released by Smash in late 1966, and became a big hit immediately. The band's second single, "Pretty Ballerina", also written by Brown, charted in early 1967, and The Left Banke released an album entitled Walk Away Renée/Pretty Ballerina, by which time Rick Brand had replaced Winfield on guitar.

Tension between Brown and the rest of the band soon began to surface, and were evident amongst almost all of their future reunions and collaborations. Brown's mental health was also accountable for much of the difficulties, and though the band's lineup didn't break due to drinking problems and drug usage, (unlike other bands a rarity in the era), Brown's Bipolar disorder took a large toll on their interactions. However, those were not the only internal issues. As Finn recalled,

Mike left the group before "Walk Away Renée" broke. He refused to tour – not that I can blame him. We'd go do gigs and get our asses kicked by local bands with better equipment. There were always disagreements with Michael's father. They tried to throw Steve, George, and me out of the band but rehired us two weeks later when they realized the chemistry was gone.

Thus, by the time "Walk Away Renée" became a hit, the original band had become inactive. However, Lookofsky tried to capitalize on the single's success by assembling a new version of the Left Banke for touring purposes, with Bert Sommer on lead vocals, original drummer Lisa David-Schierhorst, and (future member of Spinal Tap) Michael McKean on guitar. Brown also recorded a single, "Ivy, Ivy" b/w "And Suddenly" as the Left Banke, with Sommer and a group of session musicians. The remaining members of the band hired attorneys to issue a cease and desist order and urged their fan club to boycott the record, which led to confusion among radio stations over which "Left Banke" to support. Radio and Smash Records ultimately removed their support from the single, which subsequently failed to make the Billboard Hot 100. The "New" Left Banke never performed live. "And Suddenly" was eventually recorded by a group called the Cherry People and became a minor hit. McKean would later find fame as an actor (Laverne & Shirley, This Is Spinal Tap, Better Call Saul).

In late 1967, the original group reunited and recorded more material, including the single "Desirée". Brown left the group permanently shortly thereafter and was replaced for touring purposes by Emmett Lake. Cameron, Finn and Martin continued to record and tour, with Tom Feher replacing Lake on keyboards and writing half of the band's new material. The songs recorded by various incarnations of the group in 1967 and 1968 were assembled into a second LP, The Left Banke Too, which was released in November 1968. This album featured backing vocals by a young Steven Tyler (who later became the lead singer of Aerosmith) on "My Friend Today" and "Dark is the Bark". The band continued playing live in 1969, without Martin, but soon disbanded due to lack of success and financial problems. Later that same year, Brown and Martin reunited in the studio to record another single as the Left Banke, "Myrah" b/w "Pedestal", which was their final single for Smash Records.

=== 1971–2013: various reunions ===
In 1971, Brown, Cameron, Finn and Martin reunited briefly to record two songs for the movie Hot Parts. The songs, "Love Songs in the Night" and "Two by Two", were released as a Steve Martin solo single on Buddah Records, despite featuring contributions from four founding members of the Left Banke. In 1972, producer Les Fradkin offered to produce the group for a project on Bell Records. Although these sessions were not released at the time, one of the songs, "I Could Make It Last Forever", composed by Fradkin and Diane Ellis, was released on Fradkin's Goin' Back solo CD in 2006. It was a rare recording since it featured Caro, Finn, Cameron and Brown, along with Brown's father, violinist Harry Lookofsky. Fradkin sang and played 12-string guitar on the sessions. In 1978, Martin, Cameron and Finn reunited as The Left Banke to record an album's worth of material which was not released at the time. However, a single from these 1978 sessions, "Queen of Paradise" (b/w "And One Day"), was released in late 1978 with modest success. The album was eventually issued by Relix Records in 1986 under the title Strangers on a Train (Voices Calling in Europe). However, the album did little to restore the popularity of the group.

After leaving the Left Banke in 1967, Michael Brown helped form the band Montage. Although Brown was never an official member of Montage, his presence is unmistakable in its music. The band released one self-titled album in 1969, which included a re-recording of the Left Banke song "Desiree", before Brown left. Brown's next project was the band Stories, featuring singer Ian Lloyd. The band had a hit in 1973 with "Brother Louie", which reached No. 1 on the Billboard Hot 100 charts. However, Brown had left the group after their 2nd album, About Us, but before the success of "Brother Louie". Brown's next project was with the Beckies, which released one group-titled album.

In 1992, Mercury Records released a Left Banke compilation titled There's Gonna Be a Storm: The Complete Recordings 1966–1969. It was intended to bring together the band's entire recorded output from the years 1966 to 1969, although a 1969 outtake titled "Foggy Waterfall", which had previously appeared on two earlier compilations, was not included.

In 1994, Michael Brown and his wife Yvonne Vitale produced and released an album titled On This Moment. Between 2001 and 2006, Brown hosted a series of recording sessions at his home studio with Ian Lloyd (vocals), Tom Finn (bass guitar/vocals), Jim McAllister (guitar), and Jon Ihle (drums).

Swedish musician Jens Lekman sampled "I've Got Something on My Mind" in his 2003 song "Black Cab." In 2005, Alice Cooper included a cover version of "Pretty Ballerina" on his album Dirty Diamonds. In 2006, ex-member of the Bangles Susanna Hoffs and Matthew Sweet, as Sid 'n' Susie, covered "She May Call You Up Tonight" for their first album Under the Covers, Vol. 1. In addition, Stuart Murdoch of the band Belle and Sebastian has cited the Left Banke as one of the early influences on the sound of the band. Richard Thompson included a cover of "She May Call You Up Tonight" on his 1998 live album Celtschmerz.

Former guitarist Jeff Winfield died of complications from pneumonia on June 13, 2009, at age 60.

=== 2011–2013 ===
The previous touring version of the Left Banke featured one original member, George Cameron. Initially, Tom Finn and George Cameron reformed the Left Banke in March 2011, tapping New York City's Mike Fornatale (already a veteran of numerous other 1960s band reunions, including the Monks and Moby Grape) to sing lead vocals in Steve Martin Caro's stead. The reunited group also featured new players: Paul Alves (lead guitar, backing vocals), Charly Cazalet (bass), Mickey Finn (keyboards), Rick Reil (drums, percussion, backing vocals) and second keyboardist/synth player Joe McGinty (replaced by John Spurney in 2012). They appeared live at Joe's Pub in New York City on March 5, 2011, and March 6, 2011, to sold-out audiences. In April 2011, Tom Finn revealed in a Facebook posting that he had reformed the group, with two shows planned for July in New York City. Tom Finn performed with the re-formed group through 2013, after which he left due to disagreements with Cameron and back trouble.

In early 2011, Sundazed released reissues of the two Smash vinyl albums on CD and LP, utilizing the original running order and artwork.

In February 2012, Tom Finn notified the YouTube community that the Left Banke was in the process of creating a new record featuring contributions from co-founder Michael Brown.

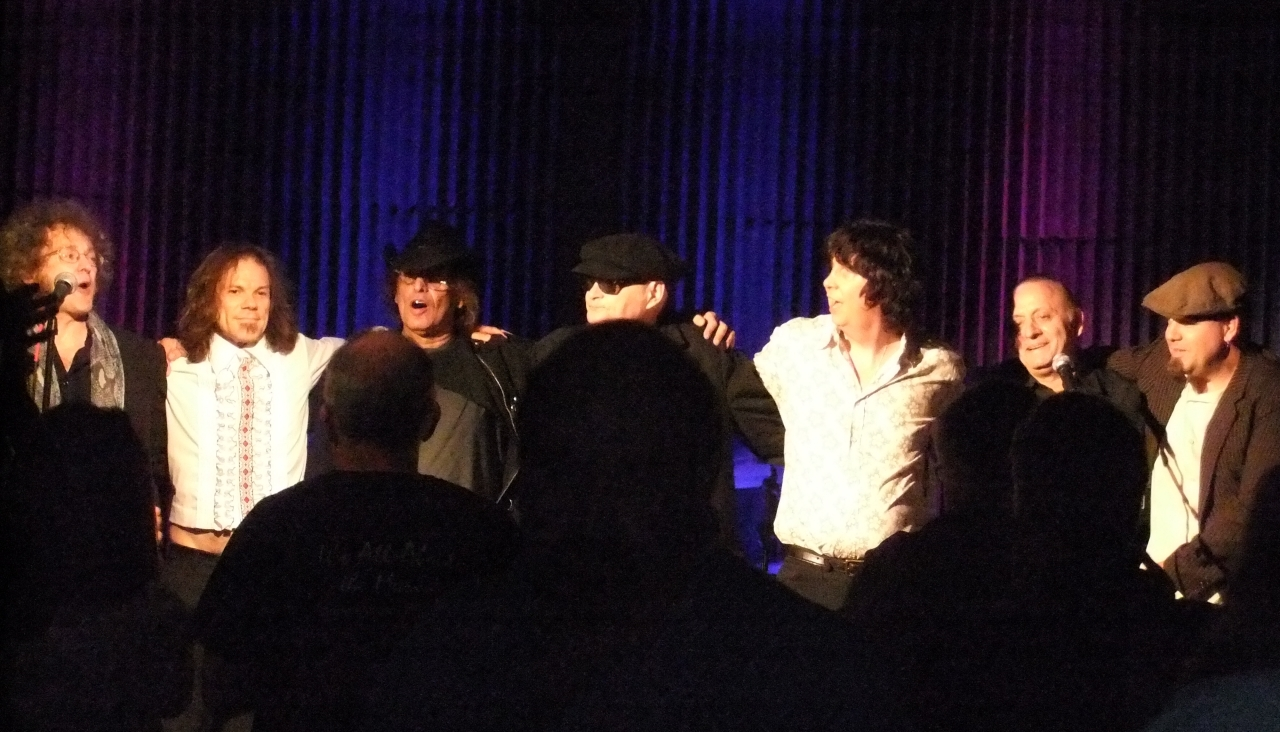
George Cameron (3rd from left) and Tom Finn (center, 4th from left) with the band during their 2012 reunion tour

On April 29, 2012, Brown joined the reunited Left Banke on stage at B.B. King's in New York City for a version of his "Pretty Ballerina". His performance was greeted with a standing ovation. Rick Brand, guitarist with the band in 1966–67, was also in attendance. Tom Finn sang a newly written song called "City Life" which showed a heavier rock version of the Left Banke with baroque string section intact. No new recordings begun in 2012 were ever released, and Brown died in 2015.

At the beginning of their reunion dates, the group was joined onstage by a two or three-piece string section and even a guest oboe player for one or two shows. Both Michael Brown and George Cameron were in touch with Steve Martin Caro, who wanted to rejoin the group, but was unable to tour in 2012 due to previous commitments.

On June 6, 2013, Brown joined the reunited Left Banke on stage at Joe's Pub in NYC for his last live performance of "Walk Away Renee".

=== 2014-2018: Unrealized reunions ===
On March 18, 2015, the day before Mike Brown's death, it was announced that original vocalist Steve Martin Caro officially rejoined the current touring version of The Left Banke. Photos on The Left Banke official Facebook and Twitter pages displayed Steve signing a contract. Two 2015 shows featured co-headliner Ian Lloyd of Stories and Sam Kogon as vocalist. The re-formed Cameron band played in New York City; Bearsville, New York; Sellersville, Pennsylvania; and Natick, Massachusetts.

In January 2018, it was announced on the official Facebook page operated by Steve Martin Caro and George Cameron that they were planning a tour. Several photos of Steve Martin Caro rehearsing with George Cameron and singer/guitarist Sam Kogon were posted with a message which stated "it was Steve's first time behind the microphone in over 15 years. We went through and workshopped much of The Left Banke catalog." However, Cameron died five months later, before any performances could take place under this collaboration.

=== Deaths ===
Michael Brown died from heart disease on March 19, 2015, at age 65. Brown had been writing new material and planned to participate in the 2015 reunion of the Left Banke with Steve Martin Caro and George Cameron. Brown's funeral and memorial service was held on March 25, 2015, at Fort Lee Gospel Church in Fort Lee, New Jersey.

Justo George Cameron (born October 16, 1947, in New York City) died of cancer at Mount Sinai Hospital in Manhattan on June 24, 2018, at age 70. Thomas Leo Feher died from heart failure on August 5, 2018. Steve Martin Caro died from heart disease on January 14, 2020. He was 71 years old. The last surviving member from the original lineup, Tom Finn, died on June 27, 2020, after years of declining health.

== Band members ==
1960s Left Banke members (1965–1969)

- George Cameron – drums, percussion, backing vocals; lead vocals, guitar (1965–1969; 1971; 1978; 2011; died 2018)
- Michael Brown – piano, harpsichord, Clavinet, organ, lead vocals (1965–1967; 1969, 1971, 1978; died 2015)
- Steve Martin Caro – lead vocals, guitar, drums, tambourine, bass (1965–1969; 1971; 1978; died 2020)
- Tom Finn – bass, guitar, backing vocals, lead vocals (1965–1969; 1971; 1978; 2011; died 2020)
- Lisa David-Schierhorst – drums (1965)
- Jeff Winfield – guitar (1966; died 2009)
- Rick Brand – guitar, banjo (1966–1967)
- Tom Feher – piano, guitar (1968–1969; died 2018)

The "New" Left Banke members

- Bert Sommer – lead vocals, guitar (1967, died 1990)
- Michael McKean – guitar (1967)
- Lisa David-Schierhorst – drums (1967)

== Discography ==
NOTE: Sources for this section are as follows:

=== Albums ===
Date	Title	Chart positions	
Date	Title	U.S. 200	Cash Box
January 1967	Walk Away Renée/Pretty Ballerina	67	59
November 1968	The Left Banke Too	—	—
March 1986	Strangers on a Train (aka Voices Calling)	—	—
"—" denotes release did not chart or become certified.

=== Compilations ===
- 1982 – And Suddenly It's...The Left Banke (Bam-Caruso KIRI 021)
- 1985 – History of The Left Banke (Rhino RNLP 123)
- 1986 – Walk Away Renée [mini-album] (Bam-Caruso PABL036)
- 1988 – And Finally It's...The Left Banke (Bam-Caruso KIRI 021 CD) – Features a different track listing to the 1982 compilation.
- 1992 – There's Gonna Be a Storm: The Complete Recordings 1966–1969 (Mercury 848095)

=== Extended plays ===
- 1983 – Walk Away Renee (Bam-Caruso NRIC022)
- 2022 – High Flyer (Omnivore Records OV-470)

=== Singles ===
Date	Single (A-side, B-side) Both sides from same album except where indicated	Label and number	Chart positions			Album
Date	Single (A-side, B-side) Both sides from same album except where indicated	Label and number	Billboard	Cash Box	RPM	Album
July 1966	"Walk Away Renée" b/w "I Haven't Got the Nerve"	Smash 2041	5	2	3	Walk Away Renée/Pretty Ballerina
December 1966	"Pretty Ballerina" b/w "Lazy Day"	Smash 2074	15	12	4	Walk Away Renée/Pretty Ballerina
March 1967	"Ivy Ivy" b/w "And Suddenly"	Smash 2089	119	106	—	Non-album tracks
May 1967	"She May Call You Up Tonight" b/w "Barterers and Their Wives"	Smash 2097	120	118	—	Walk Away Renée/Pretty Ballerina
June 1967	"Desiree'" b/w "I've Got Something on My Mind" (from Walk Away Renee/Pretty Ballerina)	Smash 2119	98	127	—	The Left Banke Too
June 1968	"Dark Is the Bark" b/w "My Friend Today"	Smash 2165	—	—	—	The Left Banke Too
November 1968	"Goodbye Holly" b/w "Sing Little Bird Sing"	Smash 2198	—	—	—	The Left Banke Too
February 1969	"Bryant Hotel" b/w "Give the Man a Hand"	Smash 2209	—	—	—	The Left Banke Too
May 1969	"Nice to See You" b/w "There's Gonna Be a Storm"	Smash 2226	—	—	—	The Left Banke Too
November 1969	"Myrah" b/w "Pedestal"	Smash 2243	—	—	—	Non-album tracks
March 1971	"Love Songs in the Night" † b/w "Two by Two"	Buddah 219	—	—	—	Non-album tracks
1978	"Queen of Paradise" b/w "And One Day"	Camerica 0005	—	—	—	Strangers on a Train
"—" Release did not chart or become certified.
"†" Release credited to Steve Martin.
