= Baroque pop =

Music genre

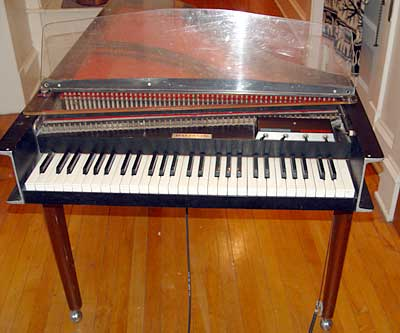
- An electric harpsichord
- Other names: Baroque rock; chamber pop
- Stylistic origins: Rock; classical; pop; orchestral pop; Baroque
- Cultural origins: 1960s, United Kingdom and United States
- Derivative forms: Philadelphia soul; chamber pop

Other topics
- List of baroque pop artists; art pop; avant-pop; progressive rock

Baroque pop (sometimes called baroque rock) is a fusion genre that combines rock music with particular elements of classical music. It emerged in the mid-1960s as artists pursued a majestic, orchestral sound and is identifiable for its appropriation of Baroque compositional styles (contrapuntal melodies and functional harmony patterns) and dramatic or melancholic gestures. Harpsichords figure prominently, while oboes, French horns, and string quartets are also common.

Although harpsichords had been deployed for a number of pop hits since the 1940s, some record producers in the 1960s increasingly placed the instrument in the foreground of their arrangements. Inspired partly by the Beatles' song "In My Life" (1965), various groups were incorporating baroque and classical instrumentation by early 1966. The term "baroque rock" was coined in promotional material for the Left Banke, who used harpsichords and violins in their arrangements and whose 1966 song "Walk Away Renée" exemplified the style.

Baroque pop's mainstream popularity faded by the 1970s, partially because punk rock, disco and hard rock took over; nonetheless, music was still produced within the genre's tradition. Philadelphia soul in the 1970s and chamber pop in the 1990s both reflected the spirit of baroque pop, while the latter incorporated much of the period's low fidelity musical aesthetic.

== Characteristics ==
The Left Banke – "Walk Away Renée" (1966)
Excerpt of "Walk Away Renée". Journalist Matthew Guerriri named the song the "quintessence" of baroque pop, citing its "elegantly jangling harpsichord".

In classical music, the term "Baroque" is used to describe the art music of Europe approximately between the years 1600 and 1750, with some of its most prominent composers including J. S. Bach and Antonio Vivaldi. Much of the instrumentation of baroque pop is akin to that of the late Baroque period or the early Classical period, chronologically defined as the period of European music from 1690 to 1760 and stylistically defined by balanced phrases, clarity and beauty.

Baroque pop, stylistically, fuses elements of rock with classical music, often incorporating layered harmonies, strings, and horns to achieve a majestic, orchestral sound. Its prominent characteristics are the use of contrapuntal melodies and functional harmony patterns. It was intended to be a more serious and mature outgrowth of rock music. Journalist Bob Stanley uses the term "English baroque" to describe a subset that existed between 1968 and 1973, after the genre's more widespread presence in rock and pop. (Note: A compilation, Tea & Symphony: The English Baroque Sound 1967–1974 (2007), features music that reviewer Stephen Thomas Erlewine says is mostly inspired by Paul McCartney, the Zombies and Gilbert O'Sullivan.) "Baroque rock" may be invoked as a synonym of "baroque pop" or as its own distinct term.

== History ==
=== 1960–1965 ===
==== Forerunners ====
The Boston Globe's Matthew Guerrieri credits the origins of baroque pop to American pop musicians and record producers like Phil Spector and the Beach Boys' Brian Wilson placing the harpsichord in the foreground of their arrangements. Harpsichords were widely available in recording studios, and had been used in popular music since as early as the 1940s, but the instrument did not gain prominence until the 1960s. One of the first pop rock hits to use a harpsichord was the Jamies' "Summertime, Summertime" (1958). Later examples cited by Guerrieri range from the Beach Boys' "I Get Around" (1964) and "When I Grow Up (To Be a Man)" (1965) to the Righteous Brothers "You've Lost That Lovin' Feelin'" (1964) and the Mamas & the Papas' "Monday, Monday" (1966). Guerrieri speculates that the harpsichord may have been desirable for its buzzing, stinging timbre, which suited "the treble-heavy pop soundscape" of the time. (Note: In the 1960s, most recordings were monaural, and AM radio was the dominant form of musical consumption.)

The 1964 single "She's Not There" by the English band the Zombies marked a starting point for baroque pop, according to Stanley. He writes that the song "didn't feature any oboes but stuck out rather dramatically in 1964, the year of 'You Really Got Me' and 'Little Red Rooster'", that its arrangement was comparably "restrained" and "almost medieval", and that its refined qualities were emphasised by singer Colin Blunstone having an enunciation that was "pure St Albans grammar".

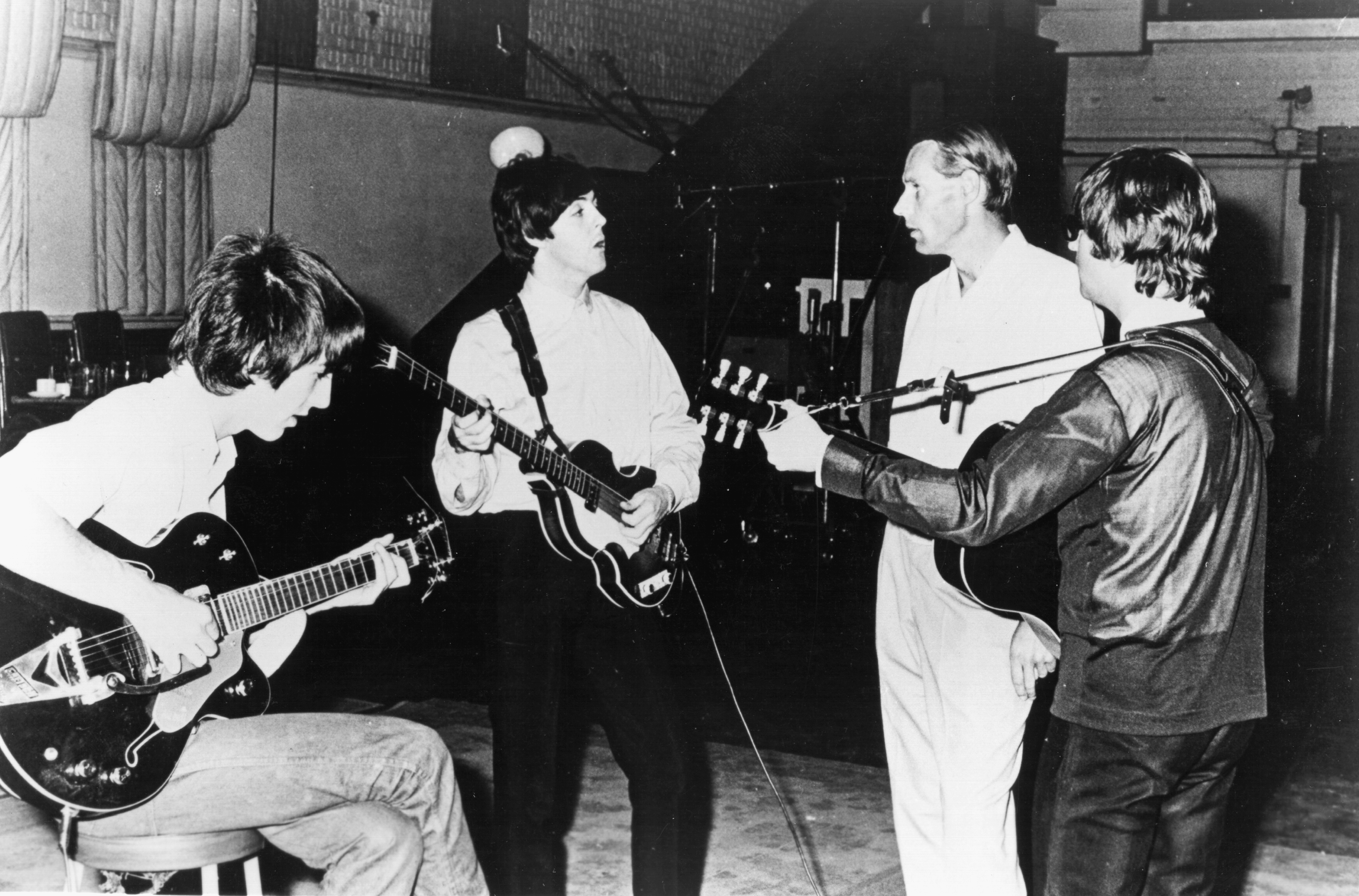
The Beatles working in the studio with their producer George Martin, c. 1965

Along with Burt Bacharach, Spector melded pop music with classical elements before they were combined with rock. Music historian Andrew Grant Jackson states that "the era of baroque pop", in which "rock melded with classical elements", began with the Rolling Stones' "Play with Fire" (February 1965) and Brian Wilson's work on The Beach Boys Today! (March 1965). In Jackson's view, baroque pop and chamber pop were one and the same. The Yardbirds single "For Your Love" (March, 1965) further popularized the use of the harpsichord in commercial pop rock music. Slate's Forrest Wickman credits the Beatles' producer, George Martin, along with Paul McCartney and Wilson, as some of the men "most responsible" for the move into baroque pop.

Author Bernard Gendron says that, further to American composer and conductor Leonard Bernstein's public approval of the band's music, the Beatles were feted in the "art-music world" in the summer of 1965 through the arrival of "'Beatles à la Baroque' or more generically 'baroque rock'". He also writes that since this phenomenon preceded the release of Beatles recordings such as "Yesterday" (which used a classical string quartet), it is likely that the band did not instigate the link between their music and its classical components, but were in fact responding to classical and baroque readings of their work. These readings also included the 1965 album The Baroque Beatles Book, where their songs were reimagined in a tongue-in-cheek Baroque setting.

A classically trained musician, Martin played what sounded like a baroque harpsichord solo on the Beatles' "In My Life", released on their December 1965 album Rubber Soul. (Note: The instrument used was actually a piano recorded on tape at half speed and then sped up.) Author Joe Harrington comments that due to the Beatles' influence in all areas of pop music's development, "In My Life" led to the arrival of "baroque-rock". Producer Tommy LiPuma recalled that "Once the Beatles featured that harpsichord sound on 'In My Life,' pop producers began working it in."

=== 1965–1968 ===
==== Origins ====
The genre originated in the United Kingdom and the United States. By early 1966, further to Rubber Soul, various groups began using baroque and classical instrumentation, described as a "baroque rock" movement by Gendron. Among these recordings was the Rolling Stones' "Lady Jane". The popularity of harpsichords in pop, rock and soul arrangements at this time reflected a desire for unusual sounds and, in the case of many American producers, a sought-for association with the retrospective focus that informed London's fashion scene and the psychedelic music scene there.

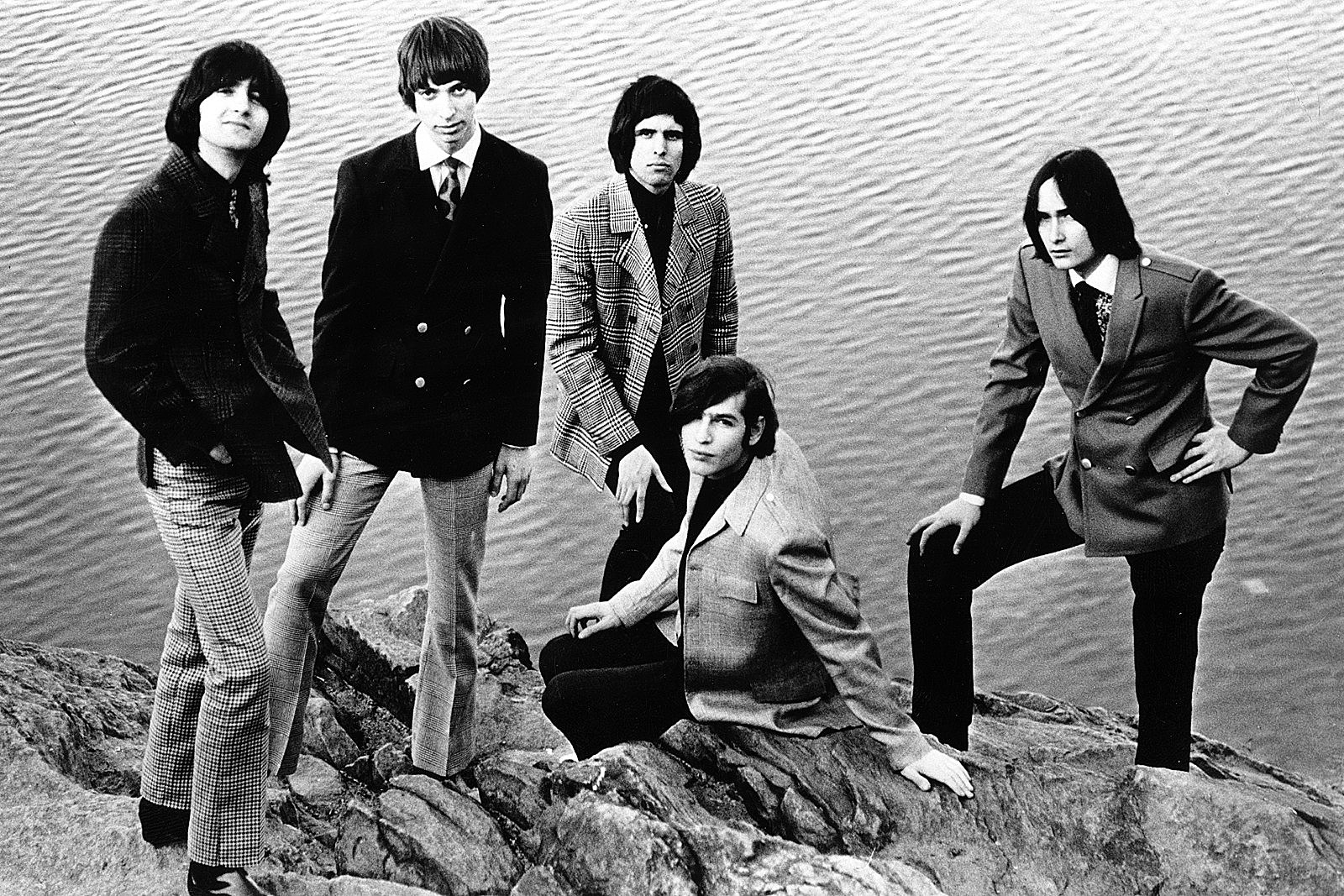
The Left Banke, 1966

The Zombies' "She's Not There", together with a predilection for all things British through the Beatles' international success, inspired New York musician Michael Brown to form the Left Banke. Stanley considers the band's "Walk Away Renée" (1966) to be the first recognizable baroque pop single. "Baroque rock" was the label devised by the Left Banke's publicists and the music press. According to music critic Richie Unterberger, "the sobriquet may have been ham-fisted, but certainly there were many Baroque elements in the Left Banke's pop—the stately arrangements, the brilliant use of keyboards and harpsichords, the soaring violins, and the beautiful group harmonies." (Note: Guerriri says that, in Britain, the song "bridged the passage from rock into psychedelica for numerous groups: the Beatles, the Rolling Stones, the Zombies, [and] the Kinks".) The band's follow-up single, "Pretty Ballerina", continued their absorption in the genre. Guitarist Rick Brand later described their lyrics as "rather self-consciously beautiful musical whimsy, as you find in the latter 18th-century Romantic music, pre-Beethoven".

Although the Beach Boys' Pet Sounds (1966) has been advanced in later years as baroque pop, or even the first example of the genre, no contemporary press material referred to the album as "baroque", and instead commentators focused on the album's "progressive" traits. The album's baroque-pop aesthetics were limited to one track, "God Only Knows", a song that The Record's Jim Beckerman deemed "baroque rock" in the same "retro instrumentation and elegant harmonies" vein as the Beatles' "Eleanor Rigby" (1966) and Procol Harum's "A Whiter Shade of Pale" (1967).

Gendron's "baroque rock" examples include "Walk Away Renée" with Spanky and Our Gang's "Sunday Will Never Be the Same" (1967), and the Stone Poneys' "Different Drum" (1967) – all of which used harpsichord and strings – and the Rolling Stones' "Lady Jane" (harpsichord and dulcimer) and the Lovin' Spoonful's "Rain on the Roof" (1966, harpsichord-sounding guitars). Music journalist Steve Smith highlights the Moody Blues and Procol Harum as "major practitioners" of baroque pop. He recognizes "For No One", "She's Leaving Home" and "Piggies" as other examples of the Beatles' forays in the genre, and "Ride On, Baby" and "Ruby Tuesday" as further examples of the Rolling Stones' baroque pop.

According to Stanley, the period of sustained commercial success for pop and rock recordings with harpsichords and string quartets climaxed with the Beatles' 1967 album Sgt. Pepper's Lonely Hearts Club Band, "which mixed everyday lyrics with music hall and Edwardiana to create lysergically enhanced parlour music". Also in 1967, producer Mark Wirtz attempted to create a baroque pop concept album with A Teenage Opera, but the project as a whole remained unfinished. However, the single "Excerpt from A Teenage Opera" reached No. 2 in the UK. At this time, the development in musical arrangements presented by baroque pop was challenged by the breakthrough of psychedelic rock bands from the San Francisco scene. In a climate equally informed by political radicalism in 1968, Stanley writes, "English baroque" continued as a combined simulacrum of the Zombies' album Odessey and Oracle (1968), McCartney's contributions to The Beatles (1968), Honeybus's single "I Can't Let Maggie Go" (1968), Scott Walker's chamber pop, and Crosby, Stills & Nash vocal harmonies. (Note: Stanley believes that this "lost corner of pop history" prevailed while the "predominant trend [from 1968] was to get hairier, heavier, more long-winded". He describes Honeybus as "the quintessential English baroque group".)

=== Dissipation and revival (1970s–present) ===
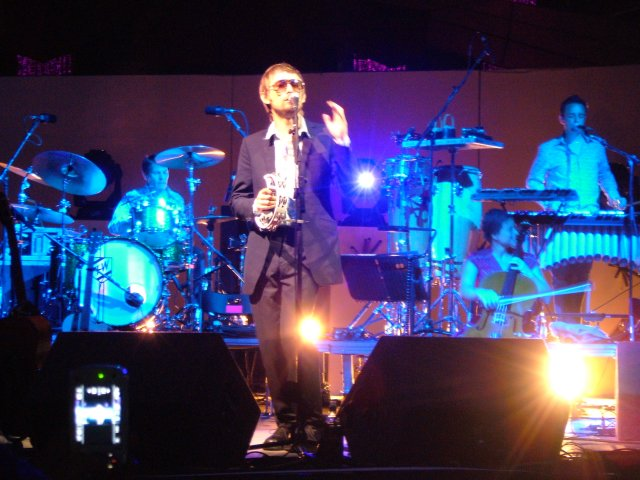
The Irish band the Divine Comedy contributed to a baroque pop revival beginning in the 1990s.

English baroque survived into the early 1970s, as record labels sought to capitalize on the singer-songwriter phenomenon by offering lavish string arrangements to unknowns. Among these artists were Nick Drake and individual members of Honeybus. The quaintness of baroque pop and the use of violins and classical guitar became the target of parody at the end of the psychedelic era. One notable instance of a baroque pop song after its dissipation is the 1982 single "Golden Brown" by British rock band the Stranglers, featuring a harpsichord and unconventional time signatures and tuning.

In the 1990s, chamber pop derived from the spirit of baroque pop, characterized by an infusion of orchestral arrangements or classical style composition. It originated as a response to the lo-fi production that dominated in the 1990s. Between the 1990s and 2010s, baroque pop enjoyed a revival with bands like the Divine Comedy. The American rock band Panic! at the Disco shifted to a baroque pop sound with their 2008 album Pretty. Odd. English rock band Arctic Monkeys shifted to a baroque pop sound with their 2018 album Tranquility Base Hotel & Casino and their 2022 album The Car, most likely influenced by frontman Alex Turner's work with the Last Shadow Puppets.

== Bibliography ==
- Doggett, Peter (2015). Electric Shock: From the Gramophone to the iPhone – 125 Years of Pop Music. London: The Bodley Head. ISBN 978-1-84792-218-2.
- Gendron, Bernard (2002). Between Montmartre and the Mudd Club: Popular Music and the Avant-Garde. University of Chicago Press. ISBN 978-0-226-28737-9.
- Harrington, Joe S. (2002). Sonic Cool: The Life & Death of Rock 'n' Roll. Hal Leonard Corporation. ISBN 978-0-634-02861-8.
- Hawkins, Stan (2015). Queerness in Pop Music: Aesthetics, Gender Norms, and Temporality. Routledge. ISBN 978-1-317-58972-3.
- Howland, John (2021). Hearing Luxe Pop: Glorification, Glamour, and the Middlebrow in American Popular Music. Univ of California Press. ISBN 978-0-520-30010-1. Archived from the original on June 28, 2021.
- Jackson, Andrew Grant (2015). 1965: The Most Revolutionary Year in Music. Thomas Dunne Books. ISBN 978-1-250-05962-8. Archived from the original on August 15, 2021.
- Perný, Lukáš (2014). Music Counterculture at the Break of 1960s and 1970s in the Culturological Perspective (in Slovak). Univerzita Konštantína Filozofa v Nitre, Filozofická fakulta, Katedra kulturológie. ISBN 978-80-558-0677-8.
- Unterberger, Richie (2014). Urban Spacemen & Wayfaring Strangers: Overlooked Innovators & Eccentric Visionaries of '60s Rock. BookBaby. ISBN 978-0-9915892-4-1. Archived from the original on April 13, 2017.
- White, Michael (2015). Popkiss: The Life and Afterlife of Sarah Records. Bloomsbury Publishing. ISBN 978-1-62892-220-2.
