= Four Tops discography =

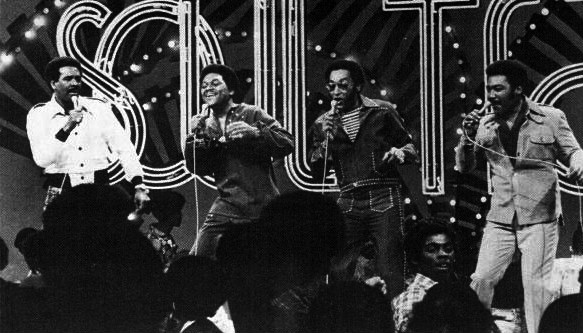
- Four Tops in 1974
- Studio albums: 27
- Live albums: 2
- Compilation albums: 10
- Singles: 59

This is the discography of all the singles and albums released by Motown singing group the Four Tops.

Throughout their career, 24 of their singles reached the top 40 of the Billboard Hot 100 with seven of them reaching the top 10 and two reaching number one on the chart. An additional 21 songs have reached the UK Top 40 with ten reaching the top ten and one reaching number one on the chart.

Much of the group's catalog is now controlled by Universal Music Group, as a result of various transactions involving many of the record labels for which the Four Tops recorded for over the years.

== Albums ==
=== Studio albums ===
Date	Title	Label	US peaks		International peaks			Certifications
Date	Title	Label	Bill 200	R&B	CAN	GER	UK	Certifications
1965	Four Tops	Motown	63	1	—	—	—	
1965	Four Tops Second Album	Motown	20	3	—	—	—	
1966	On Top	Motown	32	3	—	—	9	
1967	On Broadway	Motown	79	15	—	—	—	
1967	Reach Out	Motown	11	3	25	—	4	BPI: Silver
1968	Yesterday's Dreams	Motown	91	7	43	—	37	
1969	Four Tops Now!	Motown	74	18	—	—	—	
1969	Soul Spin	Motown	163	30	—	—	—	
1970	Still Waters Run Deep	Motown	21	3	37	—	29	
1970	Changing Times	Motown	109	20	—	—	—	
1970	The Magnificent 7 (with The Supremes)	Motown	113	18	73	—	6	
1971	The Return of the Magnificent Seven (with The Supremes)	Motown	154	18	—	—	—	
1971	Dynamite (with The Supremes)	Motown	160	21	—	—	—	
1972	Nature Planned It	Motown	50	4	—	—	—	
1972	Keeper of the Castle	ABC/Dunhill	33	6	—	—	—	
1973	Main Street People	ABC/Dunhill	66	8	—	—	—	
1974	Meeting of the Minds	ABC/Dunhill	118	22	—	—	—	
1975	Night Lights Harmony	ABC/Dunhill	148	24	—	—	—	
1976	Catfish	ABC/Dunhill	124	26	—	—	—	
1977	The Show Must Go On	ABC/Dunhill	—	54	—	—	—	
1978	At the Top	ABC/Dunhill	—	73	—	—	—	
1981	Tonight!	Casablanca	37	5	—	—	—	
1982	One More Mountain	Casablanca	—	45	—	—	—	
1983	Back Where I Belong	Motown	—	47	—	—	—	
1985	Magic	Motown	140	33	—	—	—	
1988	Indestructible	Arista	149	66	—	33	—	
1995	Christmas Here with You	Motown	—	—	—	—	—	
"—" denotes items that did not chart or were not released in that territory.

=== Compilation albums ===
Date	Title	Label	US peaks		International peaks		Certifications
Date	Title	Label	Bill 200	R&B	NOR	UK	Certifications
1968	The Four Tops Greatest Hits	Motown	4	2	7	1	RIAA: Gold
1971	Greatest Hits Volume 2	Motown	106	22	—	25	
1973	The Best of the 4 Tops	Motown	103	35	—	—	
1973	The Four Tops Story 1964–72	Motown	—	—	—	35	
1974	Anthology	Motown	—	42	—	—	
1982	The Best of the Four Tops	K-tel	—	—	—	13	BPI: Gold
1990	Their Greatest Hits	Telstar	—	—	—	47	
1992	The Singles Collection	PolyGram	—	—	—	11	BPI: Silver
1997	The Ultimate Collection	Motown	—	—	—	—	BPI: Gold
1999	The Millennium Collection: The Best of Four Tops	Motown	—	—	—	—	
2008	Classic Four Tops: The Masters Collection	Spectrum Music	—	—	—	—	BPI: Silver
2011	S.O.U.L.	BMG/Sony	—	49	—	—	
"—" denotes items that did not chart or were not released in that territory.

=== Live albums ===
Date	Title	Label	US peaks		International peaks		Certifications
Date	Title	Label	Bill 200	R&B	CAN	UK	Certifications
1966	Four Tops Live!	Motown	17	1	23	4	
1974	Live & in Concert	ABC/Dunhill	92	29	—	—	
"—" denotes items that did not chart or were not released in that territory.

== Singles ==
=== Early releases ===
- 1956: "If Only I Had Known" b/w "She Gave Me Love" (Grady Records, credited as "The Four Aims")
- 1956: "Kiss Me Baby" b/w "Could It Be You?" (Chess Records)
- 1960: "Ain't That Love" b/w "Lonely Summer" (Columbia Records, reissued in 1965) (US #93)
- 1962: "Where Are You" b/w "Pennies from Heaven" (Riverside Records)

=== Motown releases ===
Year	Single	B-side	US charts		International chart peaks						Certifications	Album (main title)
Year	Single	B-side	Hot 100	US R&B	BEL	CAN	GER	IRE	NED	UK	Certifications	Album (main title)
1964	"Baby I Need Your Loving"	"Call On Me"	11	—	—	4	—	—	—	—		Four Tops
1964	"Without the One You Love (Life's Not Worth While)"	"Love Has Gone"	43	—	—	—	—	—	—	—		Four Tops
1965	"Ask the Lonely"	"Where Did You Go"	24	9	—	16	—	—	—	—		Four Tops
1965	"I Can't Help Myself (Sugar Pie Honey Bunch)"	"Sad Souvenirs" (from Four Tops)	1	1	—	4	—	—	—	23	BPI: 2× Platinum	Four Tops Second Album
1965	"It's the Same Old Song"	"Your Love Is Amazing" (from Four Tops)	5	2	—	3	—	—	—	34	BPI: Silver	Four Tops Second Album
1965	"Something About You"	"Darling I Hum Our Song"	19	9	—	6	—	—	—	—		Four Tops Second Album
1966	"Shake Me, Wake Me (When It's Over)"	"Just as Long as You Need Me" (from Four Tops Second Album)	18	5	—	52	—	—	—	—		On Top
1966	"Loving You Is Sweeter Than Ever"	"I Like Everything About You" (from Four Tops Second Album)	45	12	—	35	—	—	—	21		On Top
1966	"Reach Out I'll Be There"	"Until You Love Someone" (from On Top)	1	1	10	6	13	4	6	1	RIAA: Gold; BPI: Gold	Reach Out
1966	"Standing in the Shadows of Love"	"Since You've Been Gone" (from Four Tops Second Album)	6	2	17	11	29	—	—	6		Reach Out
1967	"Bernadette"	"I Got a Feeling" (from On Top)	4	3	—	4	—	—	14	8		Reach Out
1967	"7-Rooms of Gloom"	"I'll Turn to Stone" ^{[A]}	14	10	18	17	—	20	—	12		Reach Out
1967	"You Keep Running Away"	"If You Don't Want My Love" (non-album track)	19	7	—	16	—	—	—	26		Greatest Hits Volume 2
1968	"Walk Away Renée"	"Your Love Is Wonderful" (non-album track)	14	15	—	2	31	5	12	3		Reach Out
1968	"If I Were a Carpenter"	"Wonderful Baby"	20	17	12	21	34	6	4	7		Reach Out
1968	"Yesterday's Dreams"	"For Once in My Life" (from On Broadway)	49	31	—	29	—	—	—	23		Yesterday's Dreams
1968	"I'm a Believer"	"Wonderful Baby"	—	—	—	—	—	—	—	—		Yesterday's Dreams
1968	"I'm in a Different World"	"Remember When"	51	23	—	25	—	—	—	27		Yesterday's Dreams
1969	"What Is a Man"	"Don't Bring Back Memories"	53	—	—	56	—	—	—	16		Four Tops Now!
1969	"Do What You Gotta Do"	"Can't Seem to Get You; Out of My Mind" (from Yesterday’s Dreams)	—	—	—	—	—	—	—	11		Four Tops Now!
1969	"Don't Let Him Take; Your Love from Me"	"The Key"	45	25	—	43	—	—	—	—		Four Tops Now!
1970	"It's All in the Game"	"Love (Is the Answer)"	24	6	—	13	—	—	—	5		Still Waters Run Deep
1970	"Still Water (Love)"	"Still Water (Peace)"	11	4	—	16	—	—	—	10		Still Waters Run Deep
1970	"River Deep – Mountain High" (with The Supremes)	"Together We Can Make; Such Sweet Music"	14	7	23	20	—	12	25	11		The Magnificent 7
1971	"Just Seven Numbers (Can Straighten Out My Life)"	"I Wish I Were Your Mirror" (from Still Waters Run Deep)	40	9	—	76	—	—	—	36		Changing Times
1971	"You Gotta Have Love in Your Heart" (with The Supremes)	"I'm Glad About It"	55	41	—	—	—	—	—	25		The Return of the Magnificent Seven
1971	"In These Changing Times"	"Right Before My Eyes"	70	28	—	—	—	—	—	—		Changing Times
1971	"MacArthur Park (Part II)"	"MacArthur Park (Part I)"	38	27	—	37	—	—	—	—		Four Tops Now!
1971	"A Simple Game"	"L.A. (My Town)" (from Still Waters Run Deep)	90	34	29	—	—	14	11	3		(single release only)
1972	"I Can't Quit Your Love"	"Happy (Is a Bumpy Road)"	—	—	—	—	—	—	—	—		Nature Planned It
1972	"Walk with Me, Talk with Me, Darling"	"L.A. (My Town)"	—	—	—	—	—	—	—	32		Nature Planned It
1972	"(It's the Way) Nature Planned It"	"I'll Never Change"	53	8	—	69	—	—	—	—		Nature Planned It
"—" denotes items that did not chart or were not released in that territory.

- ^{[A]} "I'll Turn to Stone", as a B-side, peaked at No. 76 on the US Billboard Hot 100 chart and reached No. 50 on the US Billboard R&B singles chart.

=== ABC/Dunhill & ABC releases ===
Year	Single	B-side	US charts		International chart peaks						Certifications	Album (main title)
Year	Single	B-side	Hot 100	R&B HipHop	BEL	CAN	GER	IRE	NED	UK	Certifications	Album (main title)
1972	"Keeper of the Castle"	"Jubilee with Soul"	10	7	—	32	—	—	—	18		Keeper of the Castle
1972	"Guardian De Tu Castillo"	"Jubilee with Soul"	—	—	—	—	—	—	—	—		Keeper of the Castle
1973	"Ain't No Woman (Like the One I've Got)"	"The Good Lord Knows"	4	2	—	11	—	—	—	—	RIAA: Gold	Keeper of the Castle
1973	"Are You Man Enough"	"Peace of Mind"	15	2	—	35	—	—	—	—		Main Street People
1973	"Sweet Understanding Love"	"Main Street People"	33	10	—	—	—	—	—	29		Main Street People
1974	"I Just Can't Get You Out of My Mind"	"Am I My Brother's Keeper"	62	18	—	56	—	—	—	—		Main Street People
1974	"One Chain Don't Make No Prison"	"Turn On the Light of Your Love"	42	3	—	38	—	—	—	—		Meeting of the Minds
1974	"The Well Is Dry"	"Midnight Flower"	—	—	—	—	—	—	—	—		Meeting of the Minds
1974	"Midnight Flower"	"All My Love"	55	5	—	69	—	—	—	—		Meeting of the Minds
1975	"Seven Lonely Nights"	"I Can't Hold On Much Longer"	71	13	—	88	—	—	—	—		Night Lights Harmony
1975	"We All Gotta Stick Together"	"(It Would Almost); Drive Me Out Of My Mind"	97	17	—	—	—	—	—	—		Night Lights Harmony
1976	"Catfish"	"Look at My Baby"	71	7	—	82	—	—	—	—		Catfish
1976	"I'm Glad You Walked into My Life"	"Mama You're All Right with Me"	—	72	—	—	—	—	—	—		Night Lights Harmony
1977	"Feel Free"	"I Know You Like it"	—	29	—	—	—	—	—	—		Catfish
1977	"Strung Out for Your Love"	"You Can't Hold Back On Love"	—	—	—	—	—	—	—	—		Catfish
1977	"The Show Must Go On"	"Runnin' from Your Love"	—	84	—	—	—	—	—	—		The Show Must Go On
1977	"For Your Love"	"You'll Never Find a Better Man"	—	—	—	—	—	—	—	—		The Show Must Go On
1978	"H.E.L.P"	"Inside a Brokenhearted Man"	—	38	—	—	—	—	—	—		At the Top
"—" denotes items that did not chart or were not released in that territory.

=== Casablanca & RSO releases ===
Year	Single	B-side	US charts		International chart peaks						Certifications	Album (main title)
Year	Single	B-side	Hot 100	US R&B	BEL	CAN	GER	IRE	NED	UK	Certifications	Album (main title)
1981	"When She Was My Girl"	"Something to Remember"	11	1	—	24	—	7	—	3	BPI: Silver	Tonight!
1981	"Don't Walk Away"	"I'll Never Ever Leave Again"	—	—	6	—	37	24	6	16		Tonight!
1982	"Let Me Set You Free"	"From a Distance"	—	71	—	—	—	—	—	—		Tonight!
1982	"Tonight I'm Gonna Love You All Over"	"I'll Never Ever Leave Again"	—	32	—	—	—	—	—	43		Tonight!
1982	"Back to School Again"	"Rock-A-Hula Luau"	71	—	—	—	—	—	—	62		Grease 2 (soundtrack)
1982	"Sad Hearts"	"I Believe in You and Me" ^{[B]}	84	40	—	—	—	—	—	—		One More Mountain
"—" denotes items that did not chart or were not released in that territory.

- ^{[B]} "I Believe In You and Me" peaked at No. 40 on the US Billboard R&B singles chart.

=== More Motown releases ===
Year	Single	B-side	US charts		International chart peaks						Certifications	Album (main title)
Year	Single	B-side	Hot 100	R&B HipHop	BEL	CAN	GER	IRE	NED	UK	Certifications	Album (main title)
1983	"I Just Can't Walk Away"	"Hang"	71	36	—	—	—	—	—	95		Back Where I Belong
1985	"Sexy Ways"	"Body and Soul"	—	21	—	—	—	—	—	—		Magic
1986	"Hot Nights"	"Again"	—	82	—	—	—	—	—	—		Hot Nights
"—" denotes items that did not chart or were not released in that territory.

=== Arista releases ===
Year	Single	B-side	US charts		International chart peaks						Certifications	Album (main Title)
Year	Single	B-side	Hot 100	US R&B	BEL	CAN	GER	IRE	NED	UK	Certifications	Album (main Title)
1988	"If Ever a Love There Was" (with Aretha Franklin)	"Indestructible"	—	31	—	46	—	—	—	—		Indestructible
1988	"Indestructible" (with Smokey Robinson)	"Are You with Me"	35	57	12	14	14	—	14	30		Indestructible
1988	"Loco in Acapulco"	"Change of Heart"	—	—	13	—	23	9	9	7	BPI: Silver	Indestructible
1989	"The Sun Ain't Gonna Shine"	"Loco in Acapulco"	—	—	—	—	—	—	—	84		Indestructible
"—" denotes items that did not chart or were not released in that territory.

== Videography/DVDs ==
- Live at the MGM Grand: 40th Anniversary Special (1996)
- The Four Tops [semi-documentary/concert rehearsal – recorded live for French TV, 1971] (2004)
- From the Heart: The 50th Anniversary Concert (2006)
- Reach Out: Definitive Performances 1965 – 1973 (2008)
