= The Four Tops Greatest Hits =

Greatest Hits
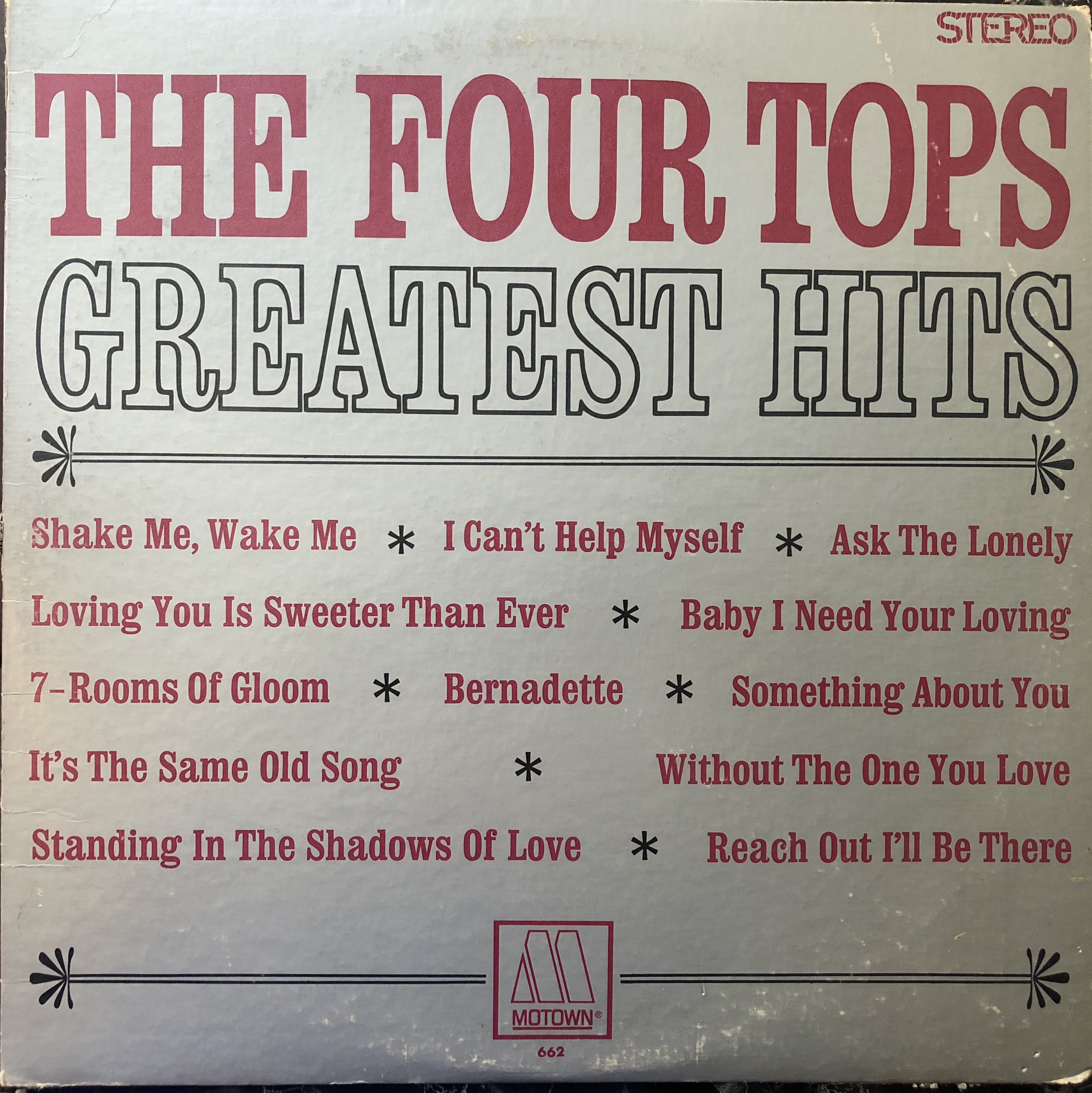

Compilation album by Four Tops
- Released: August 1967
- Genre: Soul; pop
- Length: 33:18
- Label: Motown

Four Tops chronology
Reach Out (1967)	Greatest Hits (1967)	Yesterday's Dreams (1968)

Professional ratings
Review scores
Source	Rating
AllMusic	4.5/5 stars

The Four Tops Greatest Hits is a greatest hits album by the Four Tops, released in August 1967. It peaked at No. 4 on the Billboard albums chart in the United States, remaining on the chart for 73 weeks, and is the first Motown album and first album by a black act to reach No. 1 in Britain. It spent one week at the top of the UK Albums Chart in 1968. the original British release had 16 tracks on it; this is the US album. The additional tracks were "I'll Turn to Stone", "Where Did You Go?", "Darling, I Hum Our Song", and "You Keep Running Away".

== Track listing ==
All tracks are written by Brian Holland, Lamont Dozier and Eddie Holland, except as noted.

Side one
No.	Title	Original album	Length
1.	"Baby I Need Your Loving"	Four Tops (1965)	2:45
2.	"It's the Same Old Song"	Four Tops Second Album (1965)	2:45
3.	"Reach Out I'll Be There"	Reach Out (1967)	2:59
4.	"Ask the Lonely" (Ivy Jo Hunter, William "Mickey" Stevenson)	Four Tops (1965)	2:59
5.	"Standing in the Shadows of Love"	Reach Out (1967)	2:35
6.	"Loving You Is Sweeter Than Ever" (Ivy Jo Hunter, Stevie Wonder)	On Top (1966)	2:45

Side two
No.	Title	Original album	Length
1.	"I Can't Help Myself (Sugar Pie Honey Bunch)"	Four Tops Second Album (1965)	2:44
2.	"Without the One You Love (Life's Not Worth While)"	Four Tops (1965)	2:54
3.	"7-Rooms of Gloom"	Reach Out (1967)	2:35
4.	"Something About You"	Four Tops Second Album (1965)	2:45
5.	"Bernadette"	Reach Out (1967)	3:00
6.	"Shake Me, Wake Me (When It's Over)"	On Top (1966)	2:32
Total length:			33:18

== Charts ==
Chart performance for The Four Tops Greatest Hits
Chart (1967–1968)	Peak position
Norwegian Albums (VG-lista)	7
UK Albums (OCC)	1
US Billboard 200	4
