= Four Tops Live! =

Live album by Four Tops
- Released: November 1966
- Recorded: August 22 and September 11, 1966
- Venue: Upper Deck of The Roostertail, Detroit, Michigan, United States
- Genre: Rhythm and blues
- Length: 51:58
- Language: English
- Label: Motown

Four Tops chronology
On Top (1966)	Four Tops Live! (1966)	On Broadway (1967)

Four Tops Live! is the first live album by American rhythm and blues vocal band The Four Tops, released on Motown in 1966. The album was recorded as part of a series of concerts by the record label featuring their premier artists held in Detroit and had positive critical and commercial reception.

== Recording and release ==
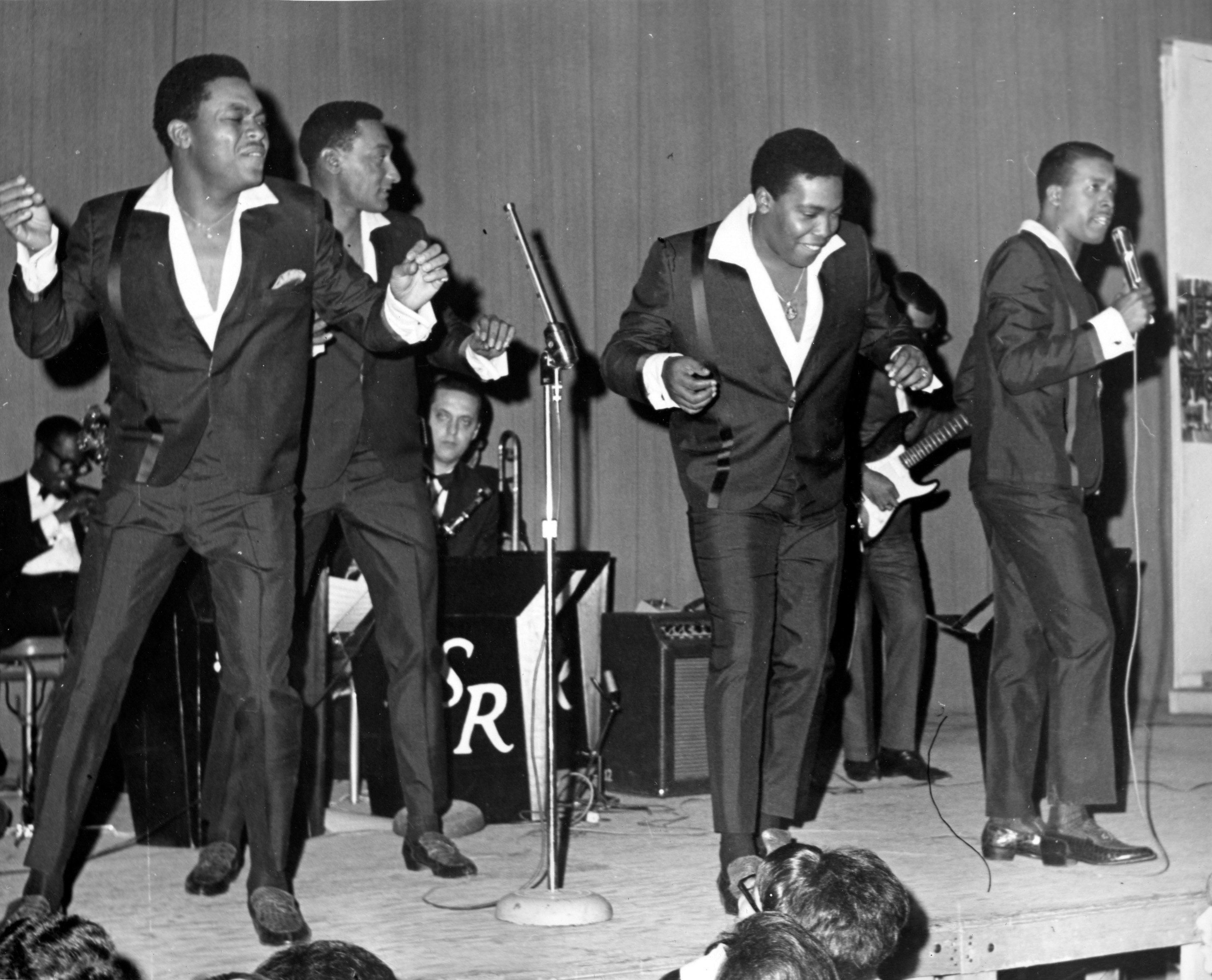
Four Tops were known for their electric live performances, such as this one photographed in 1967

Most of the tracks on Four Tops Live! were recorded on August 22, 1966 at The Roostertail in Detroit, as the inaugural concert in the Motown Monday series held that year by WKNR to showcase Motown's best-selling artists. Chuck Thurston of The Detroit Free Press reviewed the August performance, noting the "frantic, always-in-motion harmonies" and superb musicianship of the backing band. The single for Reach Out I’ll Be There had been released four days prior and went on to become a signature tune for the group, so they recorded a second show on September 11 of that year at the same venue, as well as a cover version of "You Can’t Hurry Love" which was at the top of the charts at that time.

Domestically, Four Tops Live! was a hit, topping the R&B charts that year and ranking third in Billboard's Top R&B LP's of 1967. In the United Kingdom, the record had even more sustaining popularity, reaching fourth place on the charts, staying in the top 10 for three months, and spending 72 total weeks charting.

== Reception ==
A brief review in Billboard noted that both the energetic crowd-pleasing songs and the ballads on this release were interesting and this album captured the group's "winning personal style". Writing for Crawdaddy, Sandy Pearlman praised the emotion and excitement on this recording, calling it "a whole living, breathing rock show". The editorial staff of AllMusic Guide scored this release three out of five stars, with reviewer Ron Wynn calling this album "one of the few live albums that really conveys the flavor of the group without sacrificing performance quality" and noting that it captures the nature of their live performances.

== Track listing ==
All songs written by Holland–Dozier–Holland, except where noted

1. Introduction – 0:03
2. "It's the Same Old Song" – 2:33
3. "It's Not Unusual" (Les Reed and Gordon Mills) – 2:52
4. "Baby I Need Your Loving" – 5:42
5. "Reach Out I'll Be There" – 3:15
6. "I'll Turn to Stone" – 2:19
7. "I Left My Heart in San Francisco" (George C. Cory, Jr. and Douglass Cross) – 5:03
8. "You Can't Hurry Love" – 2:38
9. "Ask the Lonely" (Ivy Jo Hunter and William "Mickey" Stevenson) – 4:10
10. "Climb Ev'ry Mountain" (Oscar Hammerstein and Richard Rodgers) – 4:15
11. "The Girl from Ipanema" (Antônio Carlos Jobim, Antônio Carlos Jobim, and Vinicius de Moraes) – 2:40
12. "If I Had a Hammer" (Lee Hays and Pete Seeger) – 7:28
13. "I Can't Help Myself" – 5:52
14. "I Like Everything About You" – 3:20

== Personnel ==
The Four Tops

- Renaldo “Obie” Benson – vocals
- Abdul “Duke” Fakir – vocals
- Lawrence Payton – vocals
- Levi Stubbs – vocals

Additional personnel

- Earl Van Dyke band
- Scott Regen – introduction, liner notes
- Harry Weber – design
