= Live & in Concert =

Live album by Four Tops
- Released: 1974
- Genre: Soul music
- Length: 39:39
- Language: English
- Label: Dunhill
- Producer: Steve Barri; Dennis Lambert; Brian Potter

Four Tops chronology
Meeting of the Minds (1974)	Live & in Concert (1974)	Night Lights Harmony (1975)

Live & in Concert is a 1974 live album by American soul music vocal group Four Tops, released by Dunhill Records.

== Reception ==
A review in Billboard recommends this album to retailers as a "super set" with "stunning live performances". Editors at AllMusic Guide scored this release 2.5 out of five stars, with reviewer Andrew Hamilton praising the "crack sound system" for the recording and opining that several of the live versions rival their studio recordings in quality.

== Track listing ==
1. Intro and countdown – 0:36
2. "Are You Man Enough" (Dennis Lambert and Brian Potter) – 3:10
3. "Love Ain't Easy to Come By" – 3:17
4. Medley: "Love Music" (Lambert and Potter) / "Reach Out I'll Be There" (Lamont Dozier, Brian Holland, and Eddie Holland) / "Standing in the Shadows of Love" (Holland–Dozier–Holland) – 5:23
5. "Midnight Flower" (Reginald Dozier and McKinley Jackson) – 3:40
6. "Baby I Need Your Lovin'" (Holland–Dozier–Holland) – 4:36
7. "Keeper of the Castle" (Lambert and Potter) – 2:34
8. "I Am Your Man" (Nickolas Ashford and Valerie Simpson) – 9:39
9. "Ain't No Woman (Like the One I've Got)" (Lambert and Potter) – 3:08
10. "One Chain Don't Make No Prison" (Lambert and Potter) – 3:09
11. "I Can't Help Myself (Sugar Pie, Honey Bunch)" (Holland–Dozier–Holland) – 3:07

== Personnel ==
Four Tops

- Renaldo Benson – bass vocals
- Abdul Fakir – first tenor vocals
- Lawrence Payton – second tenor vocals, keyboards
- Levi Stubbs – lead baritone vocals

Additional personnel

- Gil Askey – conducting
- Steve Barri – production
- Ben Benay – guitar
- George Bohanon – horn
- Julius Brooks – horn
- Tim Bryant – design
- Cliff Carter – keyboards
- Marion Childers – horn
- Reggie Dozier – assistant engineering
- Gene Estes – percussion, vibraphone
- King Errisson – percussion, congas
- Wilton Felder – bass guitar, introduction
- Ed Greene – drums
- Phil Kaye – engineering
- Dennis Lambert – production
- Jim Lockert – assistant engineering
- Charles Loper – horn
- Roger Nichols – assistant engineering
- Michael Omartian – keyboards
- Dean Parks – guitar
- Brian Potter – production
- Jerome Richardson – horn
- Herman Riley – horn
- Bobby Shaw – art direction
- Sahib Shihab – horn
- Ron Slenzak – photography
- Maurice Spears – horn
- Ernie Watts – horn
- Snooky Young – horn

== Chart performance ==
Live & in Concert peaked at 92 on the Billboard Top LPs chart and 29 on the R&B albums chart.

== See also ==
- List of 1974 albums
