= Night Lights Harmony =

Studio album by Four Tops
- Released: July 1975
- Genre: Soul
- Length: 38:30
- Label: ABC
- Producers: Steve Barri; Lawrence Payton

Four Tops chronology
Live & in Concert (1974)	Night Lights Harmony (1975)	Catfish (1976)

Night Lights Harmony is the fifteenth studio album by American soul music vocal group Four Tops, released by ABC Records.

== Reception ==
Editors at AllMusic Guide scored this release two out of five stars. The 1992 edition of The Rolling Stone Album Guide also rated this release two out of five stars. In Portraying Performer Image in Record Album Cover Art , art critic Ken Bielen suggests that the cover painting—a departure from most Four Tops albums that feature photographs of the performers—shows the harmony that group's vocals can give listeners by combining the busy cityscape of Times Square along with the exotic birds meeting in the sky.

== Track listing ==
1. "Seven Lonely Nights" (James Ralph Bailey, Rudy Clark, and Ken Williams) – 3:02
2. "Mama You're All Right with Me" (Dennis Lambert Brian Potter) – 3:16
3. "Is This the Price?" (Deke Richards) – 3:12
4. "We All Gotta Stick Together" (Richard Beasley, Fred Bridges, Richard Knight, and Lawrence Payton) – 4:50
5. "I've Got What You Need" (George Byrd, Henderson Huggins, and Joe Wilson) – 4:36
6. "I Can't Hold on Much Longer" (Renaldo Benson, Bridges, Payton, and Willie D. Thomas) – 3:59
7. "(It Would Almost) Drive Me Out of My Mind" (Rob Benson, Bridges, Payton, and Killie Thomas) – 3:40
8. "I'm Glad You Walked into My Life (Dedicated to Stevie)" (Gil Askey, Leonard Lee, and Payton) – 6:03
9. "Let Me Know the Truth" (Clifford Carter) – 5:52

== Personnel ==
Four Tops

- Renaldo Benson – bass vocals
- Abdul Fakir – first tenor vocals
- Lawrence Payton – second tenor vocals, production
- Levi Stubbs – lead baritone vocals

Additional personnel

- Steve Barri – percussion, production
- Ben Benay – guitar
- Max Bennett – bass guitar
- Ginger Blake – backing vocals
- Clifford Carter – keyboards
- Phil Cross – mastering
- King Erisson – percussion
- Victor Feldman – percussion
- Wilton Felder – bass guitar
- Chuck Findley – horn
- Jay Graydon – guitar
- Ed Greene – drums
- Paul Hubinon – horn
- Phil Kaye – recording
- Jackie Kelso, Jr. – horn
- Lew McCreary – horn
- Roger Nichols – recording, mixing
- Michael Omartian – keyboards, arrangement
- Dean Parks – guitar
- Lee Ritenour – guitar
- Fred Selden – horn
- Sidney Sharp – concertamster
- The Sid Sharp Strings – strings
- David T. Walker – guitar
- Ernie Watts – horn

== Chart performance ==
Night Lights Harmony peaked at 148 on the Billboard 200 and reached 24 on the R&B charts.

== See also ==
- List of 1975 albums
