= When She Was My Girl =

- Side A of the US single

Single by Four Tops

from the album Tonight!
- B-side: "Something to Remember"
- Released: August 1981
- Genre: R&B, soul
- Length: 3:25
- Label: Casablanca
- Songwriters: Larry Gottlieb, Marc Blatte
- Producer: David Wolfert

Four Tops singles chronology
"Catfish" (1976)	"When She Was My Girl" (1981)	"Back to School Again" (1982)

"When She Was My Girl" is a 1981 single released by American vocal group the Four Tops. The song, their first release off Casablanca Records, helped to return the former signature Motown act to the American pop Top 40 charts, peaking at No. 11 on the US Billboard Hot 100, No. 10 on the Cashbox chart, and reaching No. 1 on the R&B charts.

Internationally, it reached No. 9 in Canada, No. 6 in New Zealand, and also became their first top 10 hit in the UK in ten years, reaching No. 3. Their top 40 showing made the group one of the few acts to have top 40 singles on the Billboard Hot 100 in three consecutive decades. Record World called it an "infectious dancer." "When She Was My Girl" was a Grammy nominee for best R&B song. Singer-songwriter Bruce Springsteen recorded the song for his 2022 studio album, Only the Strong Survive.

== Chart performance ==
=== Weekly charts ===
Chart (1981)	Peak position
Canadian RPM Adult Contemporary	3
Canadian RPM Top Singles	9
Ireland	7
New Zealand (RIANZ)	6
UK	3
US Billboard Hot 100	11
US Billboard Adult Contemporary	9
US Cashbox Top 100	10
US Billboard R&B	1

=== Year-end charts ===
Chart (1981)	Rank
UK	59
US American Top 40	88
US Cash Box	77

== Certifications ==
Region	Certification	Certified units/sales
United Kingdom (BPI)	Silver	250,000^{^}
^{^} Shipments figures based on certification alone.

== Credits ==
- Lead vocals by Levi Stubbs and Renaldo "Obie" Benson
- Background vocals by Abdul "Duke" Fakir and Lawrence Payton
- Music Contractor Frank DeCaro
