= Meeting of the Minds (album) =

Studio album by Four Tops
- Released: 1974
- Genre: Soul
- Length: 41:10
- Label: Dunhill
- Producer: Steve Barri; Dennis Lambert; Brian Potter

Four Tops chronology
Main Street People (1973)	Meeting of the Minds (1974)	Live & in Concert (1974)

Meeting of the Minds is the fourteenth studio album by American soul music vocal group Four Tops, released by Dunhill Records.

== Reception ==
Editors at AllMusic Guide scored this release three out of five stars, with reviewer Jason Elias criticizing that the "production failed to capitalize on the group's chemistry, offering songs that were formulaic and stale", but also noting that there are a few good tracks, particularly "Tell Me You Love Me (Love Sounds)".

== Track listing ==
1. "One Chain Don't Make No Prison" (Dennis Lambert and Brian Potter) – 4:29
2. "Midnight Flower" (Reginald Dozier and McKinley Jackson) – 4:03
3. "The Well Is Dry" (Lambert and Potter) – 3:48
4. "Love Ain't Easy to Come By" (Lambert and Potter) – 3:38
5. "No Sad Songs" (Leonard Caston, Ronald Foster, and Len Perry) – 5:14
6. "Right On Brother" (Lambert and Potter) – 4:05
7. "Tell Me You Love Me (Love Sounds)" (Al Cleveland and Lawrence Payton) – 3:30
8. "All My Love" (Renaldo Benson and Val Benson) – 4:29
9. "I Found the Spirit" (Renaldo Benson and Val Benson) – 3:54
10. "Meeting of the Minds" (Lambert and Potter) – 4:22

== Personnel ==
Four Tops

- Renaldo Benson – bass vocals
- Abdul Fakir – first tenor vocals
- Lawrence Payton – second tenor vocals
- Levi Stubbs – lead baritone vocals

Additional personnel

- Steve Barri – percussion, production
- Ben Benay – guitar
- Larry Carlton – guitar
- Gary Coleman – percussion
- Scott Edwards – bass guitar
- King Errisson – percussion
- Wilton Felder – bass guitar
- Howard Gale – recording
- Ed Greene – drums
- Paul Humphrey – drums
- Phil Kaye – recording
- Dennis Lambert – keyboards, production
- Michael Omartian – keyboards
- Ray Parker, Jr. – guitar
- Dean Parks – guitar
- Barney Perkins – recording
- Brian Potter – percussion, production
- Sidney Sharp – concertmaster
- Ron Slenzak – photography
- David Willardson – illustration
- Vic Zaslav – mastering

== Chart performance ==
Meeting of the Minds peaked at 118 on the Billboard 200 and reached 22 on the R&B charts.

== See also ==
- List of 1974 albums
