= Still Waters Run Deep (album) =

Studio album by Four Tops
- Released: March 1970
- Recorded: September 15, 1969 ("L.A."); December 15, 1969 – January 24, 1970
- Studio: Hitsville USA, Detroit
- Genre: Soul, pop
- Length: 29:43
- Label: Motown
- Producer: Frank Wilson, Smokey Robinson

Four Tops chronology
| Soul Spin (1969) | Still Waters Run Deep (1970) | Changing Times (1970) |

Singles from Still Waters Run Deep
- 1. "It's All In The Game" Released: March 20, 1970; 2. "Still Water (Love)" Released: August 6, 1970

Still Waters Run Deep is the ninth studio album by the American vocal group Four Tops.

== Reception ==
Professional ratings
Review scores
| Source | Rating |
|---|---|
| Allmusic | 3/5 stars |

Besides "L.A. (My Town)", which was recorded on September 15, 1969, the album was recorded between December 15, 1969, and January 24, 1970. Motown Records released the album in March 1970. Produced by longtime Norman Whitfield associate Frank Wilson, the album returned (the) Four Tops to the Top 40 on the Billboard album chart where it remained for 42 weeks peaking at #21. The album yielded the popular Top 30 hits, "Still Water (Love)" (#11), which was co-written by Smokey Robinson and their cover of "It's All in the Game" (#24), which featured rare co-leads by Four Tops members Abdul "Duke" Fakir, Renaldo "Obie" Benson and Lawrence Payton singing alongside prominent lead Levi Stubbs. The album also served as inspiration behind singer Marvin Gaye's What's Going On, the hit title track, which was written by Benson. With this album the Four Tops staged a major comeback after two years of declining sales and Frank Wilson emerged as a producer to be reckoned with at Motown. At the same time that Wilson reinvigorated this group he also launched the Supremes sans Diana Ross with Up The Ladder To The Roof. Going into the 1970s with these two noteworthy successes, Wilson would go on to have hits on Eddie Kendricks (Keep On Truckin' and Boogie Down) as well as The Originals.

== Track listing ==
Side One

1. "Still Water (Love)" (Smokey Robinson, Frank Wilson) 3:09
2. "Reflections" (Holland–Dozier–Holland) 3:25
3. "It's All in the Game" (Charles Dawes, Carl Sigman) 2:44
4. "Everybody's Talkin'" (Fred Neil) 2:53
5. "Love is the Answer" (Smokey Robinson, Kathy Wakefield, Frank Wilson) 2:26

Side Two

1. "I Wish I Were Your Mirror" (Pam Sawyer, Frank Wilson) 3:09
2. "Elusive Butterfly" (Bob Lind) 3:07
3. "Bring Me Together" (Kathy Wakefield, Frank Wilson) 2:59
4. "L.A. (My Town)" (Sherlie Matthews) 3:09
5. "Still Water (Peace)" (Smokey Robinson, Frank Wilson) 2:42

== Personnel ==
=== Four Tops ===
- Levi Stubbs – lead vocals (baritone)
- Abdul Fakir – first tenor vocals
- Lawrence Payton – second tenor vocals
- Renaldo Benson – bass vocals (lead singer on Side 1 Track 3)

=== Others ===
- David Van DePitte, Jerry Long, Jimmy Roach – arrangers
- The Funk Brothers – instrumentation
- Marv Tarplin – guitar
- Brenda Joyce Evans, Billie Rae Calvin, and The Andantes – additional backing vocals
- Curtis McNair – art direction
- Larry Raphael – photography

== Charts ==
| Chart (1970) | Peak position |
|---|---|
| Billboard Pop Albums | 21 |
| Billboard Top Soul Albums | 3 |

=== Singles ===
| Year | Single | Chart positions | |
| Year | Single | US Hot 100 | US R&B |
|---|---|---|---|
| 1970 | "Still Water (Love)" | 11 | 4 |
| 1970 | "It's All in the Game" | 24 | 6 |
