= One More Mountain =

Studio album by Four Tops
- Released: August 9, 1982
- Studios: Cherokee, Hollywood, USA (basic tracks and horn); Hollywood Sound, Hollywood, USA (additional recording); House of Music, West Orange, USA (additional recording); Olympic, London, UK (strings); RCA Studio 1, New York City (vocal overdubs)
- Genre: Soul
- Length: 37:02
- Label: Casablanca
- Producer: David Wolfert

Four Tops chronology
Tonight! (1981)	One More Mountain (1982)	Back Where I Belong (1983)

Singles from One More Mountain
- 1. "Sad Heart / I Believe in You and Me" Released: August 1982

One More Mountain is the twentieth studio album by American soul music vocal group, Four Tops, released by Casablanca Records. This was the second and final album the group recorded for this label before rejoining their long-time home Motown.

== Reception ==
Editors at AllMusic Guide scored this release 1.5 out of five stars, with reviewer Andrew Hamilton calling it a "sedate effort". The 1992 edition of The Rolling Stone Album Guide rated this release two out of five stars.

== Track listing ==
1. "Sad Hearts" (Marc Blatte and Laurence B. Gottlieb) – 2:52
2. "One More Mountain to Climb" (Sandy Linzer and David Wolfert) – 4:57
3. "Givin' It Up" (Blatte and Gottlieb) – 3:14
4. "I Believe in You and Me" (Linzer and Wolfert) – 4:02
5. "I'm the One" (Larry Henley and Johnny Slate) – 4:10
6. "Keep On Lightin' My Fire" (Renaldo Benson and Ronnie McNeir) – 5:29
7. "Nobody's Gonna Love You Like I Do" (Lawrence Payton, Joe Stubbs, and Levi Stubbs) – 3:58
8. "Dream On" (Jerry Paul Keller and Geoffrey Brillhart Leib) – 3:34
9. "Whatever It Is" (Mark Gray, Jerry Michael, and Edward F. Sester) – 4:46

== Personnel ==
Four Tops

- Renaldo Benson – bass vocals
- Abdul Fakir – first tenor vocals
- Lawrence Payton –second tenor vocals|arrangement]]
- Levi Stubbs – lead baritone vocals, vocal arrangement

Additional personnel

- Jack Adelman – mastering at Jack's Shack
- "Crusher" Bennett – percussion
- David Boruff – saxophone
- Lawrence Burrage – engineering at Olympic Recording Studios, Barnes, London, England, United Kingdom
- Ernie Carlson – bass trombone, trombone
- Louis Cortelezzi – saxophone solo
- Richard Crooks – percussion
- Bert DeCoteaux – string arrangement
- Nathan East – bass guitar
- Dennis Ferrante – engineering at RCA Recording Studios, New York City, New York, United States, mixing
- Chuck Findley – flugelhorn, trumpet
- Linda Gerrity – production coordination
- Keith Grant – engineering at Olympic Recording Studios, Barnes, London, England, United Kingdom
- Gary Grimshaw – album concept
- Larry Hall – flugelhorn, trumpet
- John Harmon – illustration
- Kim Hutchcroft – saxophone
- Paul Jackson, Jr. – guitar
- Charles Koppelman – executive production
- Charles Loper – bass trombone, trombone
- Lumel Whiteman Studio – graphics
- Steve Madaio – flugelhorn, trumpet
- Bill Meyers – keyboards, horn arrangement, rhythm arrangement
- Alan Meyerson – flugelhorn
- John Phillips – saxophone
- Paul Ray – assistant engineering
- Carlos Rios – guitar
- John Robinson – drums
- Steven Rubinstein – string bass
- Dave Samuels – vibraphone, orchestra bells
- Al Schmidt – engineering at
- Neil Stubenhaus – bass guitar
- Lee Thornburg – flugelhorn, trumpet
- Ed Walsh – synthesizer solo
- Thomas Weschler – album concept
- David Williams – guitar
- David Wolfert – guitar, rhythm arrangement, string arrangement, production

== Chart performance ==
One More Mountain peaked at No. 45 on the Billboard R&B albums chart.

== See also ==
- List of 1982 albums
