= Soul Spin =

Studio album by Four Tops
- Released: November 1969
- Genre: Soul music
- Length: 36:08
- Language: English
- Label: Motown
- Producer: Frank Wilson

Four Tops chronology
Four Tops Now! (1969)	Soul Spin (1969)	Still Waters Run Deep (1970)

Soul Spin is the eighth studio album by American soul music vocal group Four Tops, released by Motown.

== Reception ==
A review in Billboard recommends this album to retailers for its "sophisticated sound". Editors at AllMusic Guide scored this release 2.5 out of five stars, with critic John Bush noting how producer Frank Wilson pushed the group to experiment on this recording, but characterizing this album as "curiosities, though, perfect for hardcore Motown fans listeners interested in digging deeper". Bush also reviewed a 2001 compilation of this album and Yesterday's Dreams from 2001, calling the collection dominated by "ill-advised covers" that "hardly made for great listening anytime after" its initial release. The 1992 edition of The Rolling Stone Album Guide rated this release three out of five stars.

== Track listing ==
1. "Look Out Your Window" (Cleveland Horne and Frank Wilson) – 2:57
2. "Barbara’s Boy" (Joe Hinton and Pam Sawyer) – 2:55
3. "Lost in a Pool of Red" (Sawyer and Bea Verdi) – 3:35
4. "Got to Get You into My Life" (John Lennon and Paul McCartney) – 2:37
5. "Stop the World" (Jack Goga, Freddie Gorman, and Ivory Joe Hunter) – 2:59
6. "Nothing" (Cleveland and Smokey Robinson) – 2:40
7. "This Guy’s in Love with You" (Burt Bacharach and Hal David) – 3:50
8. "Light My Fire" (John Densmore, Robby Krieger, Ray Manzarek, and Jim Morrison) – 3:35
9. "Honey" (Russell Ballard) – 3:50
10. "The Look of Love" (Bacharach and David) – 4:10
11. "California Dreamin’" (John Phillips and Michelle Phillips) – 3:10

== Personnel ==
Four Tops

- Renaldo Benson – bass vocals
- Abdul Fakir – first tenor vocals
- Lawrence Payton –second tenor vocals
- Levi Stubbs – lead baritone vocals

Additional personnel

- Tom Baird – arrangement
- Henry Cosby – arrangement
- Jerry Long – arrangement
- Wade Marcus – arrangement
- Gene Page – arrangement
- Paul Riser – arrangement
- Frank Wilson – production

== Chart performance ==
Soul Spin was by far the weakest-performing Four Tops album yet, peaked at 163 on the Billboard 200 and reached 30 on the R&B charts.

== See also ==
- List of 1969 albums
