= At the Top =

Studio album by Four Tops
- Released: 1978
- Studio: Sigma Sound, Philadelphia, Pennsylvania, US
- Genre: Soul music
- Length: 37:06
- Language: English
- Label: ABC
- Producer: Bruce Gray; Norman Harris; Ron Tyson

Four Tops chronology
The Show Must Go On (1977)	At the Top (1978)	Tonight! (1981)

At the Top is the eighteenth studio album by American soul music vocal group, Four Tops, released by ABC Records. The album was the last the group recorded for ABC and was followed by a brief hiatus from recording. Four Tops had experienced a decline in their album sales in the 1970s and also had difficulty booking touring dates, so they initially planned to team up with former Motown associates Holland–Dozier–Holland, but they instead recorded this album with Philadelphia soul producer Norman Harris at his Sigma Sound Studios.

== Reception ==
Editors at AllMusic Guide scored this release three out of five stars, with reviewer Andrew Hamilton characterizing release as "a quality Four Tops album", but "the songs, productions, and singing deserved a better fate", with "lightweight promotion" from ABC. The 1992 edition of The Rolling Stone Album Guide rated this release two out of five stars.

== Track listing ==
1. "H.E.L.P." (Norman Harris and Ron Tyson) – 5:55
2. "Bits and Pieces" (Bruce Gray, Leroy Green, and Harris) – 4:10
3. "Seclusion" (Harris and Tyson) – 4:28
4. "Put It on the News" (Harris and Tyson) – 4:21
5. "This House" (Harris and Tyson) – 4:41
6. "Just in Time" (Harris and Tyson) – 3:47
7. "Inside a Brokenhearted Man" (Jerry Akines, John Bellman, Victor Drayton, and Buddy Turner) – 3:26
8. "When Your Dreams Take Wings and Fly" (Gray, Green, and Harris) – 6:18

== Personnel ==
Four Tops

- Renaldo Benson – bass vocals
- Abdul Fakir – first tenor vocals
- Lawrence Payton – second tenor vocals
- Levi Stubbs – lead baritone vocals

Additional personnel

- Keith Benson – drums
- Caryle J. Blackwell – production assistance, coordination
- Bruce Bluestein – assistant engineering
- George "Go-Madd" Bussey – arrangement
- Dirk Devlin – engineering
- Don Renaldo & His Swinging Strings & Horns – strings, horns
- Bill Dorman – assistant engineering
- Jack Faith – arrangement
- Richard Germinaro – art direction, artwork
- Bruce Gray – keyboards, production
- Norman Harris – guitar, arrangement, production
- Carlton Kent – keyboards
- Stuart Kusher – art direction, artwork
- Leon Mitchell – arrangement
- Earl Miller – photography
- Edward Moore – guitar
- Tom Nikosey – lettering
- Carl Paruolo – engineering
- Darrell Rogers – assistant engineering
- Rocky Schnaars – assistant engineering
- Henri Smith – percussion
- Jeffrey Stewart – assistant engineering
- Michael Tarsia – assistant engineering
- T. J. Tindall – guitar
- Ron Tyson – production
- Larry Washington – percussion
- James Williams – bass guitar

== Chart performance ==
At the Top peaked at 73 on the R&B charts.

== See also ==
- List of 1978 albums
