= The Show Must Go On (Four Tops album) =

Studio album by Four Tops
- Released: 1977
- Genres: Disco; soul
- Length: 41:08
- Label: ABC
- Producer: Lawrence Payton

Four Tops chronology
Catfish (1976)	The Show Must Go On (1977)	At the Top (1978)

The Show Must Go On is the seventeenth studio album by American soul music vocal group, Four Tops, released by ABC Records.

== Reception ==
A brief review in Billboard recommended this release to retailers for the "tight, strong vocal harmony offering a bigger than usual sound".Editors at AllMusic Guide scored this release 2.5 out of five stars, with reviewer Ed Hogan praising the title track and the songs written by Ronnie McNeir. The 1992 edition of The Rolling Stone Album Guide rated this release two out of five stars.

== Track listing ==
1. "The Show Must Go On" (Fred Bridges, Lawrence Payton, and Roquel L. Payton) – 6:59
2. "I Can't Live Without You" (Renaldo Benson and Ronnie McNeir) – 5:45
3. "Save It for a Rainy Day" (Stephen Bishop) – 3:32
4. "Runnin' from Your Love" (Bridges and L. Payton) – 3:13
5. "See the Real Me" (Sharon Riley) – 6:02
6. "Love Is a Joy" (Bridges, Michael Franklin, and L. Payton) – 8:04
7. "You'll Never Find a Better Man" (Benson and McNeir) – 3:59
8. "Candy" (Bridges and Richard Knight) – 3:03

== Personnel ==
Four Tops

- Renaldo Benson – bass vocals
- Abdul Fakir – first tenor vocals
- Lawrence Payton – second tenor vocals, keyboards, arrangement, rhythm arrangement, production
- Levi Stubbs – lead baritone vocals

Additional personnel

- Johnny Allen – arrangement
- Gil Askey – arrangement
- Pete Bishop – engineering
- Michael Boddicker – synthesizer, strings, clavinet
- Lorenzo "Bag of Tricks" Brown – percussion
- Robert Budson – keyboards
- Philip Chiang – design
- Ronald Coleman – keyboards
- Greg "Thumper" Coles – bass guitar, rhythm arrangement
- Paulinho Da Costa – percussion
- Bob Dennis – engineering
- Scott Edwards – bass guitar
- Charles Fearing – guitar
- Carolyn Franklin – vocals
- James Gadson – drums
- George Bohanon & The Cats from Karma – horns
- Joe Guastella – guitar
- McKinley Jackson – keyboards
- John Trudell & Company from Detroit – horns
- Uriel Jones – drums
- Tom Katella – guitar
- Anthony Lowe – photography
- "My Man" Ronnie McNeir – synthesizer, strings, clavinet
- Frank Mulvey – art direction
- Ray Parker Jr. – guitar
- David Penney – drums
- Barney Perkins – engineering
- Jerry Peters – keyboards, arrangement
- Greg Poree – guitar
- Sharon Ridley – keyboards, rhythm arrangement
- Sidney Sharp – strings
- Joe Smith – guitar
- Crathman P. Spencer – vocals
- Earl Van Dyke – keyboards
- Charles Veal, Jr. – strings
- Jim Vitti – engineering
- Melvin "Wah Wah" Watson – guitar
- Robert White – guitar

== Chart performance ==
The Show Must Go On reached 54 on the R&B charts.

== See also ==
- List of 1977 albums
