= Tonight! (album) =

Studio album by Four Tops
- Released: August 17, 1981
- Studios: Cherokee, Hollywood, California, US (rhythm tracks); RCA Studio 1, New York City, New York, US
- Genre: Soul
- Length: 38:09
- Label: Casablanca
- Producer: David Wolfert

Four Tops chronology
At the Top (1978)	Tonight! (1981)	One More Mountain (1982)

Tonight! is the nineteenth studio album by American soul music vocal group Four Tops, released by Casablanca Records. This was the first album the group recorded for this label followed a short period of commercial a decline in the 1970s, as well as a failed experiment at recording with former Motown associates Holland–Dozier–Holland. This release resulted in much higher chart performance than Four Tops had experienced in several years and the hit single "When She Was My Girl".

== Reception ==
A brief review of this album for Billboard recommended this album to retailers on the strength of "When She Was My Girl" and Levi Stubbs' vocals. Editors at AllMusic Guide scored this release 2.5 out of five stars, with reviewer Richie Unterberger noting the commercial and critical decline of the band in the 1970s and criticizing this album as, "fairly faceless early-'80s R&B... due much more to the material and arrangements than the singing" with production that is "lush in a very dated way". The 1992 edition of The Rolling Stone Album Guide rated this release three out of five stars.

== Track listing ==
1. "When She Was My Girl" (Marc Blatte, Larry Gottlieb) – 3:21
2. "Don't Walk Away" (Jerry Knight) – 4:07
3. "Tonight I'm Gonna Love You All Over" (Rick Ferguson, Michael Williams) – 4:36
4. "Who's Right, Who's Wrong" (Kenny Loggins, Richard Page) – 5:10
5. "Let Me Set You Free" (Sandy Linzer, David Wolfert) – 4:23
6. "From a Distance" (Henry Gaffney) – 4:06
7. "Something to Remember" (Linzer) – 4:48
8. "All I Do" (Stevie Wonder, Morris Broadnax, Clarence Paul) – 3:38
9. "I'll Never Ever Leave Again" (Bill Allen, Fred Bridges, Earl Klugh, George Martin, Lawrence Payton) – 3:58

== Personnel ==
Four Tops

- Renaldo Benson – bass vocals
- Abdul Fakir – first tenor vocals
- Lawrence Payton – second tenor vocals, vocal arrangement
- Levi Stubbs – lead baritone vocals

Additional personnel

- Ralph Schuckett – organ, synthesizer, acoustic piano (tracks 1, 9), synthesizer solo (track 7)
- Greg Mathieson – piano (track 7), rhythm arrangement (track 7)
- Bill Meyers – piano, rhythm arrangement
- Ed Walsh – synthesizer
- Kashif – synthesizer, synthesizer solo (track 8)
- David Wolfert – guitar, synthesizer, orchestra bells, rhythm arrangement (tracks 5–6), production
- David Williams – guitar
- Carlos Rios – guitar
- Greg Poiree – nylon string guitar (track 9)
- Nathan East – bass guitar
- Neil Stubenhaus – bass guitar
- Henry Davis – bass guitar (track 6)
- Neil Jason – bass guitar (track 8)
- Ron Carter – string bass
- Jeff Porcaro – drums
- Crusher Bennett – percussion
- Richard Crooks – percussion
- David Friedman – vibraphone, orchestra bells
- Tom Saviano – saxophone solo
- Joe Shepley – flugelhorn
- Lou Soloff – flugelhorn
- George Marge – flute, oboe
- Seldon Powell – flute
- Elliott Rossoff – concertmaster

=== Technical ===
- Charles Koppelman – executive production
- Linda Gerrity – production coordination
- Al Schmitt – engineering at Cherokee Recording Studios, Los Angeles, CA
- Dennis Ferrante – engineering at RCA Recording Studios, New York City, NY
- Larry Rebhun – assistant engineering at Cherokee Recording Studios, Los Angeles, CA
- Brad Gliderman – assistant engineering at Cherokee Recording Studios, Los Angeles, CA
- Bob Heimall – design
- Greg Heisler – photography
- Montxo Algora – artwork

== Chart performance ==
Tonight! peaked at 37 on the Billboard 200 and reached fifth on the R&B charts.

== See also ==
- List of 1981 albums
