= Christmas Here with You =

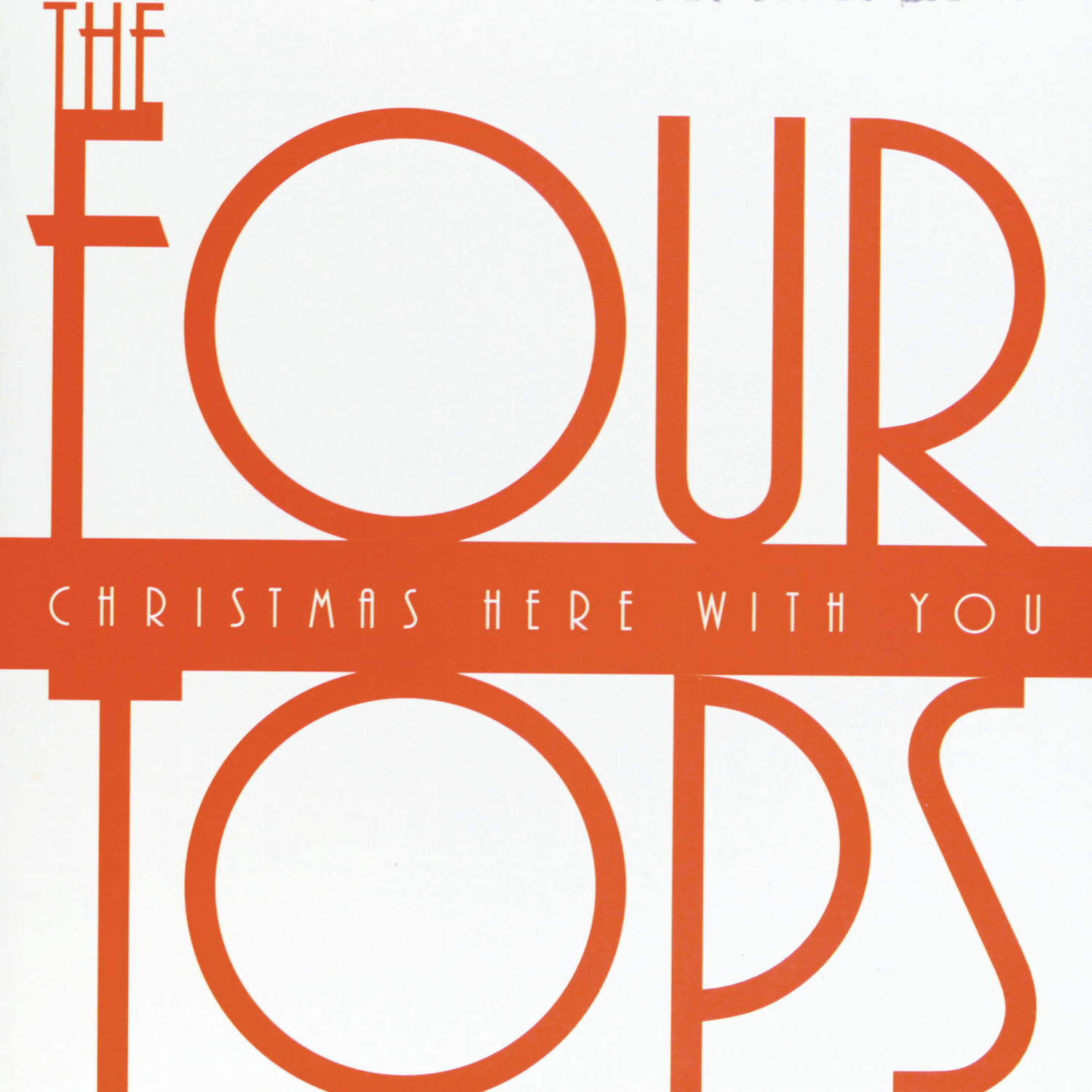

Studio album by Four Tops
- Released: November 1995
- Studios: Sonsongs Recording Studios, Las Vegas, Nevada, United States; United Sound Studio, Detroit, Michigan, United States; Vanguard Recording Complex, Oak Park, Michigan, United States
- Genres: Soul; christmas
- Length: 56:39
- Label: Motown
- Producers: Renaldo Benson; Abdul Fakir; Lawrence Payton; Levi Stubbs

Four Tops chronology
| Indestructible (1988) | Christmas Here with You (1995) | The Ultimate Collection (1997) |

Christmas Here with You is the twenty-fourth studio album by American soul music vocal group Four Tops, released on Motown. It would be the final album by the group before the death of member Lawrence Payton in June 1997.

== Reception ==
Professional ratings
Review scores
| Source | Rating |
|---|---|
| AllMusic | 3/5 stars |

An overview of rhythm and blues Christmas albums for Billboard by J. R. Reynolds recommends this release and calls it a "festive delight". A similar rundown in Ebony from 1997 also includes Christmas Here with You among recommended releases. Editors of AllMusic Guide gave this album three out of five stars, with critic Gina Boldman calling it a "predictable but festive holiday release".

It was the last studio album to feature the classic lineup of the group.

== Track listing ==
1. "Christmas Here with You" (Fred Bridges, Lawrence Payton, and George Rountree, Jr.) – 5:08
2. "White Christmas" (Irving Berlin) – 4:21
3. "The Christmas Song" (Mel Tormé and Robert Wells) – 3:58
4. "Away in a Manger" (traditional, James Ramsey Murray version) – 2:45
5. "This Christmas" (Donny Hathaway and Nadine McKinnor) – 4:33
6. "Silent Night" (Franz Gruber and Joseph Mohr) – 5:03
7. "Little Drummer Boy" (Katherine K. Davis, Henry Onorati, and Harry Simeoné) – 7:45
8. "Christmas Delight" (Renaldo Benson and Ronnie McNeir) – 3:49
9. "Merry Christmas Baby" (Lou Baxter, Charles M. Brown, and Johnny Moore) – 5:06
10. "Merry Christmas to You" (Benson and McNeir) – 4:07
11. "Have Yourself a Merry Little Christmas" (Ralph Blane and Hugh Martin) – 3:51
12. "Twas the Night Before Christmas" (Clement Clarke Moore, with additional lyrics by Rountree and Payton) – 6:28

== Personnel ==
Four Tops

- Renaldo Benson – bass vocals, arrangement, production
- Abdul Fakir – first tenor vocals, arrangement, production
- Lawrence Payton – second tenor and second lead vocals, arrangement, production, executive production
- Levi Stubbs – lead and baritone vocals, arrangement, production

Additional personnel

- Aretha Franklin – vocals on "Christmas Here with You", "White Christmas", and "Silent Night"
- Tim Gordon – alto saxophone
- The Ridgeway Sisters – backing vocals on "Little Drummer Boy" and "Have Yourself a Merry Little Christmas"

== See also ==
- List of 1995 albums
