= Four Tops Now! =

Studio album by Four Tops
- Released: March 1969
- Genre: Soul music
- Length: 41:08
- Language: English
- Label: Motown

Four Tops chronology
Yesterday's Dreams (1968)	Four Tops Now! (1969)	Soul Spin (1969)

Four Tops Now! is the seventh studio album by American soul music vocal group Four Tops, released by Motown.

== Reception ==
Editors at AllMusic Guide scored this album three out of five stars, with critic Ron Wynn characterizing it as not "among their biggest hit albums, but was a well-produced, nicely sung set anyhow". The 1992 edition of The Rolling Stone Album Guide rated this release three out of five stars.

== Track listing ==
1. "The Key" (Raynard Miner) – 2:39
2. "What Is a Man" (Johnny Bristol and Doris McNeil) – 2:39
3. "My Past Just Crossed My Future" (Janie Bradford and Miner) – 3:03
4. "Don't Let Him Take Your Love from Me" (Barrett Strong and Norman Whitfield) – 2:54
5. "Eleanor Rigby" (John Lennon and Paul McCartney) – 3:07
6. "Little Green Apples" (Bobby Russell) – 3:56
7. "Do What You Gotta Do" (Jimmy Webb) – 4:10
8. "Mac Arthur Park" (Webb) – 6:35
9. "Don't Bring Back Memories" (Raymona Singleton) – 3:01
10. "Wish I Didn't Love You So" (James Dean and William Weatherspoon) – 2:49
11. "Opportunity Knock (For Me)" (Al Cleveland) – 2:50
12. "The Fool on the Hill" (Lennon–McCartney) – 3:26

== Personnel ==
Four Tops

- Renaldo Benson – bass vocals
- Abdul Fakir – first tenor vocals
- Lawrence Payton – second tenor vocals
- Levi Stubbs – lead baritone vocals

Additional personnel

- Chester Higgins – liner notes

== Chart performance ==
Four Tops Now! peaked at 74 on the Billboard 200 and reached 18 on the R&B charts.

== See also ==
- List of 1969 albums
