= Four Tops (album) =

Studio album by Four Tops
- Released: January 21, 1965
- Label: Motown
- Producers: Brian Holland, Lamont Dozier

Four Tops chronology
Four Tops (1965)	Four Tops Second Album (1965)

Singles from Four Tops
- 1. "Baby I Need Your Loving" Released: July 10, 1964; 2. "Without the One You Love (Life's Not Worth While)" Released: November 4, 1964; 3. "Ask the Lonely" Released: January 5, 1965

Professional ratings
Review scores
Source	Rating
AllMusic	4/5 stars
The Rolling Stone Album Guide	3.5/5 stars

Four Tops is the 1965 self-titled debut studio album by the American vocal group the Four Tops. It was released by Motown Records. The album was produced and mostly written by the Motown's main writing/producing team Holland-Dozier-Holland. Four Tops includes the singles "Baby I Need Your Loving", "Without the One You Love (Life's Not Worth While)", and "Ask the Lonely".

== Track listing ==
Side 1

1. "Baby I Need Your Loving" (Holland–Dozier–Holland) – 2:43
2. "Without the One You Love (Life's Not Worth While)" (Holland–Dozier–Holland) – 2:43
3. "Where Did You Go?" (Holland–Dozier–Holland) – 2:25
4. "Ask the Lonely" (William "Mickey" Stevenson) – 2:44
5. "Your Love Is Amazing" (Holland–Dozier–Holland) – 2:22
6. "Sad Souvenirs" (Ivy Jo Hunter, William "Mickey" Stevenson) – 2:39

Side 2

1. "Don't Turn Away" (Ivy Jo Hunter, Stevenson) – 2:37
2. "Tea House in China Town" (Hunter, Stevenson) – 2:47
3. "Left With a Broken Heart" (Marv Johnson) – 2:56
4. "Love Has Gone" (Holland–Dozier–Holland) – 2:50
5. "Call on Me" (Holland–Dozier–Holland) – 2:33

== Personnel ==
- Levi Stubbs – baritone lead vocals and backing vocals
- Abdul Fakir – first tenor backing vocals
- Renaldo Benson – bass backing vocals
- Lawrence Payton – second tenor backing vocals
- The Andantes – backing vocals
- Instrumentation by the Funk Brothers

== See also ==
- List of number-one R&B albums of 1965 (U.S.)
