= Without the One You Love (Life's Not Worth While) =

Song written by Holland–Dozier–Holland

Single by Four Tops

from the album Four Tops
- B-side: "Love Has Gone"
- Released: 1964
- Recorded: Hitsville U.S.A. (Studio A); 1964
- Genre: Pop, R&B, soul
- Label: Motown
- Songwriter: Holland–Dozier–Holland
- Producers: Brian Holland; Lamont Dozier

Four Tops singles chronology
"Baby I Need Your Loving" (1964)	"Without the One You Love (Life's Not Worth While)" (1964)	"Ask the Lonely" (1965)

"Without the One You Love"

Single by The Supremes and Four Tops

from the album The Magnificent 7
- B-side: "Let's Make Love Now"
- Released: May 1972
- Recorded: Hitsville U.S.A.; 1970
- Genre: Pop, R&B, soul
- Label: Tamla Motown
- Songwriter: Holland–Dozier–Holland
- Producers: Nickolas Ashford; Valerie Simpson; Frank Wilson

The Supremes singles chronology
"Automatically Sunshine" (1972)	"Without the One You Love" (1972)	"Your Wonderful, Sweet Sweet Love" (1972)

Four Tops singles chronology
"A Simple Game" (1972)	"Without the One You Love" (1972)	"(It's the Way) Nature Planned It" (1972)

"Without the One You Love (Life's Not Worth While)" is a song written by Holland–Dozier–Holland and released as a single in 1964 by the Motown singing group The Four Tops as the second single from their self-titled debut album, Four Tops. The group would later cover the song with The Supremes.

== Lyrics and music ==
"Without the One You Love (Life's Not Worth While)" was the follow-up to the Four Tops' prior hit "Baby I Need Your Loving," and was designed to sound similar, with a similar theme, similar tempo and similar sound. The bass harmony similarly uses a subdominant progression. The opening lyrics essentially repeat the title of the earlier song. Author Sharon Davis claims that the song was "hastily written and released" to capitalize on the success of "Baby, I Need Your Loving."

== Reception ==
After the near-Top 10 success of the Tops' first hit, "Baby I Need Your Loving", "Without the One You Love" proved to be a commercial disappointment, failing to reach the Billboard Top 40, charting at No. 43. The song did better on the Cashbox R&B Chart, reaching the Top 20, charting at No. 17 (Billboard did not show R&B Chart listings during this time).

Cash Box described "Without the One You Love (Life's Not Worth While)" as "a feelingful jump'er" which is done "in very commercial fashion" and which it expected to repeat the success of "Baby, I Need Your Loving." Allmusic critic William Ruhlmann attributes its relative lack of chart success to a number of factors. One is that the title is too long. He also believes that the song is "overproduced," particularly by giving the many backup singers too prominent a role, including singing the opening lines, at the expense of lead singer Levi Stubbs. Nonetheless, fellow Allmusic critic Ron Wynn considers the song to be "marvelously sung." Author Bill Dahl describes the song as "moving." Charlie Gillett claims that the song produces an effect of "irresistible excitement."

== Chart positions ==
Chart (1964)	Peak position
US Billboard Hot 100	43
U.S. Cash Box Top 100	58
U.S. Cash Box R&B Singles	17

== Personnel ==
- Renaldo Benson – vocals
- Abdul "Duke" Fakir – vocals
- Lawrence Payton – keyboard, vocals
- Levi Stubbs – lead vocals
- The Andantes – background vocals
- Instrumentation by The Funk Brothers

== The Supremes and Four Tops version ==
A cover version of the original Four Tops song was done for The Magnificent 7 album by The Supremes and Four Tops in September 1970. Lead vocals were provided by the group's lead singers, Jean Terrell and Levi Stubbs. Nickolas Ashford & Valerie Simpson and Frank Wilson produced the H-D-H written song, and its album.

A single was released in the UK by Tamla Motown in May 1972, titled "Without the One You Love" b/w "Let's Make Love Now".

=== Personnel ===
The Supremes

- Jean Terrell – vocals
- Mary Wilson – vocals
- Cindy Birdsong – vocals

Four Tops

- Levi Stubbs – vocals
- Abdul "Duke" Fakir – vocals
- Lawrence Payton – vocals
- Renaldo Benson – vocals

=== Charts ===
Chart (1972)	Peak position
Bangkok (Billboard)	17
