= Changing Times (Four Tops album) =

Studio album by Four Tops
- Released: September 1970
- Genre: Soul music
- Length: 34:37
- Language: English
- Label: Motown
- Producer: Frank Wilson

Four Tops chronology
| Still Waters Run Deep (1970) | Changing Times (1970) | The Magnificent 7 (1970) |

Changing Times is the tenth studio album by American soul music vocal group Four Tops, released by Motown.

== Reception ==
A review in Billboard recommends this album to retailers for having an "interesting and winning pressing" and the publication highlighted several key tracks. Editors at AllMusic Guide scored this release three out of five stars, with critic Ron Wynn noting the strength of the vocalists, particularly on the title track and characterizes their work as "a solid job". The 1992 edition of The Rolling Stone Album Guide rated this release 2.5 out of five stars. The album was produced by Frank Wilson who had earlier in 1970 scored a major comeback for the Four Tops with the Still Waters Run Deep release. These two albums were on the market at the same time as follow up The Magnificent 7, with Changing Times having the weakest sales of them all.

== Track listing ==
1. "In These Changing Times" (Frank Wilson and Pam Sawyer) – 5:28
2. "Just Seven Numbers (Can Straighten Out My Life)" (Sawyer and Leon Ware) – 3:11
3. "Raindrops Keep Fallin’ on My Head" (Burt Bacharach and Hal David) – 3:40
4. "Right Before My Eyes" (Sawyer and Wilson) – 3:18
5. "I Almost Had Her (But She Got Away)" (Vincent DiMirco) – 3:12
6. "Try to Remember" (Tom Jones, Harvey Schmidt) – 4:24
7. "Something’s Tearing at the Edges of Time" (Sharon Lucas) – 2:45
8. "Sing a Song of Yesterday" (Yennik Samoht, Wilson and Sawyer) – 4:03
9. Medley: "The Long and Winding Road" / "In These Changing Times" (John Lennon and Paul McCartney / Sawyer and Wilson) – 4:36

== Personnel ==
Four Tops

- Renaldo Benson – bass vocals
- Abdul Fakir – first tenor vocals
- Lawrence Payton – second tenor vocals
- Levi Stubbs – lead baritone vocals

Additional personnel

- Curtis McNair – art direction
- Jimmy Roach – arrangement
- Tom Schlesinger – graphics
- David Van De Pitte – arrangement
- Frank Wilson – production

== Chart performance ==
Changing Times peaked at 109 on the Billboard 200 and reached 20 on the R&B charts.

== See also ==
- List of 1970 albums
