= Four Tops Second Album =

Studio album by Four Tops
- Released: November 13, 1965
- Studio: Hitsville U.S.A., Detroit
- Length: 32:09
- Label: Motown
- Producer: Brian Holland, Lamont Dozier, Smokey Robinson

Four Tops chronology
Four Tops (1964)	Four Tops Second Album (1965)	On Top (1966)

Singles from Four Tops Second Album
- 1. "I Can't Help Myself" Released: April 23, 1965; 2. "It's the Same Old Song" Released: July 9, 1965; 3. "Something About You" Released: October 21, 1965

Professional ratings
Review scores
Source	Rating
AllMusic	4/5 stars
Record Mirror	4/5 stars

Four Tops Second Album (also known as Second Album) is the second studio album by American R&B vocal quartet the Four Tops. The album, released on the Motown record label, reached No. 3 on Billboard's Black Albums chart and No. 20 on the Billboard Top LPs chart. The album contains three hit singles. "I Can't Help Myself (Sugar Pie, Honey Bunch)" reached No. 1 on both the Black Singles and Pop Singles charts, while "It's the Same Old Song" reached No. 2 and No. 5 respectively, and "Something About You" reached No. 9 and No. 19. In 1990, Motown bundled the Four Tops' first two albums together in a release titled Four Tops/Four Tops Second Album.

== Track listing ==
All songs written by Holland–Dozier–Holland (Brian Holland, Lamont Dozier, and Eddie Holland), unless otherwise noted.

Side 1

1. "I Can't Help Myself" – 2:45
2. "Love Feels Like Fire" – 2:08
3. "Is There Anything That I Can Do" (Warren "Pete" Moore, Smokey Robinson, Ronald White) – 3:07
4. "Something About You" – 2:44
5. "It's the Same Old Song" – 2:51
6. "Helpless" – 2:46

Side 2

1. "Just as Long as You Need Me" – 3:12
2. "Darling, I Hum Our Song" – 2:44
3. "I Like Everything About You" – 2:21
4. "Since You've Been Gone" – 2:33
5. "Stay in My Lonely Arms" – 2:21
6. "I'm Grateful" (Eddie Holland, Cleo Drake, George Fowler) – 2:37

== Personnel ==
=== Performance ===
- Levi Stubbs – lead baritone vocals (except tracks 2 and 11); backing vocals (tracks 2 and 11)
- Abdul Fakir – first tenor backing vocals
- Renaldo Benson – bass backing vocals
- Lawrence Payton – second tenor backing vocals (except tracks 2 and 11); lead vocals (tracks 2 and 11); keyboard
- The Andantes – backing vocals
- Instrumentation by the Funk Brothers
