= Catfish (Four Tops song) =

Single by Four Tops

from the album Catfish
- B-side: "Look at My Baby"
- Released: 1976
- Genre: Soul
- Label: ABC Records
- Songwriters: Fred Bridges, Mikki Farrow, Lawrence Payton

"Catfish" is a 1976 soul song by the Four Tops. Released as a single on ABC Records, it was the title track of the album of the same name. The track features a disco sound reminiscent of contemporary musical groups. In the United States, "Catfish" reached 71 on the Billboard Hot 100 pop singles chart and number 7 on the R&B singles chart. By the release of "Catfish" in 1976, the Four Tops popularity had begun to decline.
