= 7 Rooms of Gloom =

Single by Four Tops

from the album Reach Out
- B-side: "I'll Turn to Stone"
- Released: May 2, 1967
- Recorded: Hitsville U.S.A. (Studio A); 1967
- Genre: Soul, pop
- Length: 2:46
- Label: Motown
- Songwriter(s): Holland–Dozier–Holland
- Producer(s): Brian Holland; Lamont Dozier

Four Tops singles chronology
"Bernadette" (1967)	"7 Rooms of Gloom" (1967)	"You Keep Running Away" (1967)

"7 Rooms of Gloom" is a song originally recorded by the Motown Records vocal quartet the Four Tops. It was released as a single in 1967 on the Motown label and reached #14 on the Billboard Hot 100, and was a Top 10 R&B Hit, charting at #10. It was also a hit in the UK, their seventh, staying for nine weeks in the UK singles chart and reaching #12 and in the Netherlands where it made #23 in the Dutch Top 40.

Described as "throbbing with dread over a racing minor key dominated arrangement" it was written by Holland–Dozier–Holland. The single's B-side was "I'll Turn to Stone" also written by Holland-Dozier-Holland with R. Dean Taylor. That song made a separate chart entry, and peaked at #76 on the Billboard Hot 100 and #50 on the R&B Charts.

Cash Box called it a "thumping, fast-moving, blues-oriented rocker" that is a "real powerhouse." Record World called it "Top notch wailing from the Detroit group."

The song begins with Levi Stubbs doing a spoken recitation, which gets repeated twice with alterations.

== Personnel ==
- Levi Stubbs – lead vocals
- Abdul "Duke" Fakir – background vocals
- Renaldo "Obie" Benson – background vocals
- Lawrence Payton – background vocals
- Jackie Hicks – background vocals
- Marlene Barrow – background vocals
- Louvain Demps – background vocals
- Funk Brothers – instrumentation
