= Catfish (album) =

Studio album by Four Tops
- Released: 1976
- Genres: Disco; soul
- Length: 40:37
- Label: ABC
- Producers: Steve Barri; Lawrence Payton

Four Tops chronology
Night Lights Harmony (1975)	Catfish (1976)	The Show Must Go On (1977)

Catfish is the sixteenth studio album by American soul music vocal group, Four Tops, released by ABC Records.

== Reception ==
Editors at AllMusic Guide scored this release three out of five stars, with reviewer Andrew Hamilton praising the title track as "one of the Four Tops' most entrancing numbers", but complaining that "the rest is strictly second-rate songwriter-workshop stuff". The 1992 edition of The Rolling Stone Album Guide also rated this release two out of five stars.

== Track listing ==
1. "Catfish" (Fred Bridges, Mikki Farrow, and Lawrence Payton) – 6:36
2. "Feel Free" (Bridges, Dee Dee McNeil, and Payton) – 6:04
3. "You Can't Hold Back on Love" (Payton) – 4:25
4. "I Know You Like It" (Renaldo Benson, Bridges, and Joe Smith) – 3:31
5. "Strung Out for Your Love" (Benson, Marcus Cummings, and Clarence Paul) – 5:42
6. "Love Don't Come Easy" (Bridge, Farrow, and Payton) – 6:37
7. "Disco Daddy" (Greg "Thumper" Coles) – 3:44
8. "Look at My Baby" (Benson and Val Benson) – 3:58

== Personnel ==
Four Tops

- Renaldo Benson – bass vocals
- Abdul Fakir – first tenor vocals
- Lawrence Payton – second tenor vocals, keyboards, arrangement, production
- Levi Stubbs – lead baritone vocals

Additional personnel

- Johnny Allen – arrangement
- Gil Askey – arrangement
- Steve Barri – percussion, production
- Eddie "Bongo" Brown – percussion
- Richard "Buddy" Butson – keyboards
- Carl Austin & Co. – strings
- Clifford Carter – keyboards
- Dennis Coffey – guitar
- Greg "Thumper" Coles – bass guitar, rhythm arrangement
- Reginald Dozier – engineering
- The Funk Brothers – instrumentation
- Joe Guastella – guitar
- Doug Hyun – photography
- Johnny Trudell & Co. – horns
- Uriel Jones – drums
- Dave Penney – percussion
- Ken Sands – engineering
- Joe Smith – guitar
- Dave Van De Pitte – arrangement
- Earl Van Dyke – keyboards, rhythm arrangement
- Robert White – guitar, rhythm arrangement
- Eddie Willis – guitar

== Chart performance ==
Catfish peaked at 124 on the Billboard 200 and reached 26 on the R&B charts.

== See also ==
- List of 1976 albums
