= On Top (album) =

Studio album by Four Tops
- Released: July 8, 1966
- Length: 32:40
- Label: Motown
- Producer: Brian Holland, Eddie Holland, Lamont Dozier, Smokey Robinson

Four Tops chronology
Four Tops Second Album (1965)	On Top (1966)	On Broadway (1967)

Singles from On Top
- 1. "Shake Me, Wake Me (When It's Over)" Released: February 2, 1966; 2. "Loving You Is Sweeter Than Ever" Released: May 9, 1966

Professional ratings
Review scores
Source	Rating
Allmusic	2.5/5 stars

On Top is the third studio album recorded by the Four Tops. Issued by Motown Records on July 8, 1966, it reached number 32 on the US Billboard Top LPs chart and number 9 in the UK. It contains two singles: "Loving You Is Sweeter Than Ever" and "Shake Me, Wake Me (When It's Over)". The second half of the album consists of cover songs.

== Track listing ==
Side one

1. I Got a Feeling (Holland–Dozier–Holland) – 2:59
2. "Brenda" (Edward Holland, Jr.) – 2:37
3. "Loving You Is Sweeter Than Ever" (Ivy Jo Hunter, Stevie Wonder) – 2:46
4. "Shake Me, Wake Me (When It's Over)" (Holland–Dozier–Holland) – 2:41
5. "Until You Love Someone" (Holland–Dozier–Holland) – 3:11
6. "There's No Love Left" (Holland–Dozier–Holland) – 2:33

Side two

1. "Matchmaker, Matchmaker" (Jerry Bock, Sheldon Harnick) – 2:00
2. "Michelle" (John Lennon, Paul McCartney) – 2:35
3. "In the Still of the Night" (Cole Porter) – 2:32
4. "Bluesette" (Norman Gimbel, Toots Thielemans) – 2:33
5. "Quiet Nights of Quiet Stars" (Antônio Carlos Jobim, Gene Lees – 3:05
6. "Then" (Warren "Pete" Moore, Smokey Robinson, Bobby Rogers) – 3:04

== Personnel ==
=== Performance ===
- Renaldo Benson – bass vocals
- Abdul Fakir – first tenor vocals
- Lawrence Payton – keyboards, second tenor vocals
- Levi Stubbs – baritone lead vocals
- The Andantes - vocals
- The Funk Brothers - instrumentation
- Stevie Wonder - drums on "Loving You is Sweeter than Ever"
