= Changing Times =

Changing Times may refer to:

- Changing Times (magazine), the former name of Kiplinger Personal Finance
- Changing Times (Jon Stevens album)
- Changing Times (Four Tops album)
- Changing Times (film), a 2004 French drama film
- "Changing Times" (Falcon Crest), a 1988 television episode
- "Changin' Times", a song by the Scottish hard rock band Nazareth
- The Changin' Times, an American songwriting and performing duo
