= Ask the Lonely (Four Tops song) =

Single by Four Tops

from the album Four Tops
- B-side: "Where Did You Go"
- Released: 5 January 1965
- Recorded: Hitsville U.S.A. (Studio A); 1964
- Genre: Soul, pop
- Length: 2:27
- Label: Motown
- Songwriters: Ivy Jo Hunter, William "Mickey" Stevenson
- Producers: Eddie Holland, Lamont Dozier

Four Tops singles chronology
| "Without the One You Love (Life's Not Worth While)" (1964) | "Ask the Lonely" (1965) | "I Can't Help Myself (Sugar Pie Honey Bunch)" (1965) |

"Ask the Lonely" is a soul/pop ballad recorded by Motown singing group the Four Tops. Released as the group's third single, the single became the group's second successful single since signing with Motown in 1963. Released in 1965, the song rose to no. 24 on the pop chart and no. 9 on the R&B one. It is notable for being co-written by longtime Motown staffer Mickey Stevenson, as most of the group's hits on Motown were written and produced by Holland-Dozier-Holland. Levi Stubbs sang the lead, with The Andantes joining the other Tops (Renaldo "Obie" Benson, Lawrence Payton and Abdul "Duke" Fakir) on the background vocals. The music was performed by The Funk Brothers and the Detroit Symphony Orchestra provided the instrumentation.

Billboard described the song as a "strong ballad follow-up to [the Four Tops' previous single] 'Without the One You Love.'" Cash Box described the single as a "throbbing cha cha beat heartbreaker...that the [Four Tops] serve up with loads of feeling." Record World said that "the Tops should get a listen or two with this heavily produced rouser."
