= Still Water (Love) =

Single by The Four Tops

from the album Still Waters Run Deep
- B-side: "Still Water (Peace)"
- Released: 6 August 1970
- Genre: Soul, pop
- Length: 3:13
- Label: Motown
- Songwriters: Smokey Robinson, Frank Wilson
- Producers: Smokey Robinson, Frank Wilson

The Four Tops singles chronology
"It's All in the Game" (1970)	"Still Water (Love)" (1970)	"River Deep – Mountain High" (1970)

"Still Water (Love)" is a 1970 hit single written by Smokey Robinson and Frank Wilson (who also produced the track) for the Motown singing group Four Tops. The B-side was "Still Water (Peace)" and both songs appear on the 1970 album Still Waters Run Deep.

== Background ==
The socially conscious single was a departure from the group's past recordings and produced a smoother sound than the raucous Norman Whitfield productions that belayed on The Temptations. The single features Miracles member Marv Tarplin on guitar. Singers Brenda Joyce Evans and Billie Rae Calvin, brought to Motown by Bobby Taylor (and soon to be part of Norman Whitfield's group The Undisputed Truth), also add backing vocals. This song was noted for its repeated chord structure, beginning with E♭ major, shifting to C minor, then to B♭ major over F, before starting again at E♭ major, over and over again, without any changes or alterations to the song's fade.

== Chart performance ==
"Still Water (Love)" went to #4 on the Hot Soul Singles chart, and to #11 in the US Pop Chart. Outside the US, the song peaked at #10 on the UK Singles Chart.
