= Nature Planned It =

Studio album by the Four Tops
- Released: April 17, 1972
- Genres: R&B; soul
- Length: 38:32
- Label: Motown
- Producer: Frank Wilson

The Four Tops chronology
Dynamite (1971)	Nature Planned It (1972)	Keeper of the Castle (1972)

Nature Planned It is the eleventh studio album by American vocal group the Four Tops, released on April 17, 1972.

== Track listing ==
=== Side one ===
1. I Am Your Man — 4:30
2. (It's the Way) Nature Planned It — 3:50
3. I'll Never Change — 2:43
4. She's an Understanding Woman — 2:54
5. I Can't Quit Your Love — 3:35
6. Walk with Me Talk with Me, Darling — 2:35

=== Side two ===
1. Medley (Hey Man/We Got to Get You a Woman) — 7:14
2. You Got to Forget Him Darling — 2:38
3. If You Let Me — 2:50
4. Happy (Is a Bumpy Road) — 2:56
5. How Will I Forget You — 2:47

== Personnel ==
- The Four Tops – vocals
- Leonard Caston — keyboards
- Richard "Pistol" Allen, Andrew Smith — drums
- Jack Ashford — percussion
- Eddie "Bongo" Brown — congas, bongos
- Dennis Coffey, Eddie Willis, Mel Ragen — guitar
- James Jamerson — bass

== Production ==
- Frank Wilson — producer
- Cal Harris — recording engineer
- John Lewis — mastering engineer
- Jerry Long, David Van De Pitte — arrangements
