= You Keep Running Away =

Single by Four Tops

from the album Four Tops Greatest Hits Vol. 2
- B-side: "If You Don't Want My Love"
- Released: 1967
- Recorded: 1967
- Genre: R&B, soul
- Length: 2:48
- Label: Motown
- Songwriter: Holland-Dozier-Holland
- Producer: Holland-Dozier-Holland

Four Tops singles chronology
| "7 Rooms of Gloom" (1967) | "You Keep Running Away" (1967) | "Walk Away Renée" (1968) |

"You Keep Running Away" is a Holland-Dozier-Holland composition originally recorded in 1967 by the Four Tops. The song appears on their 1971 LP Four Tops Greatest Hits Vol. 2. Billboard described the single as a "solid easy heat rocker that moves from start to finish has all the ingredients for another chart topper."

== Background ==
As in many of their other songs, the Andantes augmented the background vocals. This was one of the last few HDH releases by the Four Tops.

== Chart history ==
"You Keep Running Away" went to number seven on the R&B charts and number nineteen on the Hot 100.

| Chart (1967) | Peak position |
|---|---|
| U.K. Singles Chart | 26 |
| U.S. Billboard Hot 100 | 19 |
| U.S. Billboard Hot Rhythm & Blues Singles | 7 |
