= Four Tops =

American vocal quartet

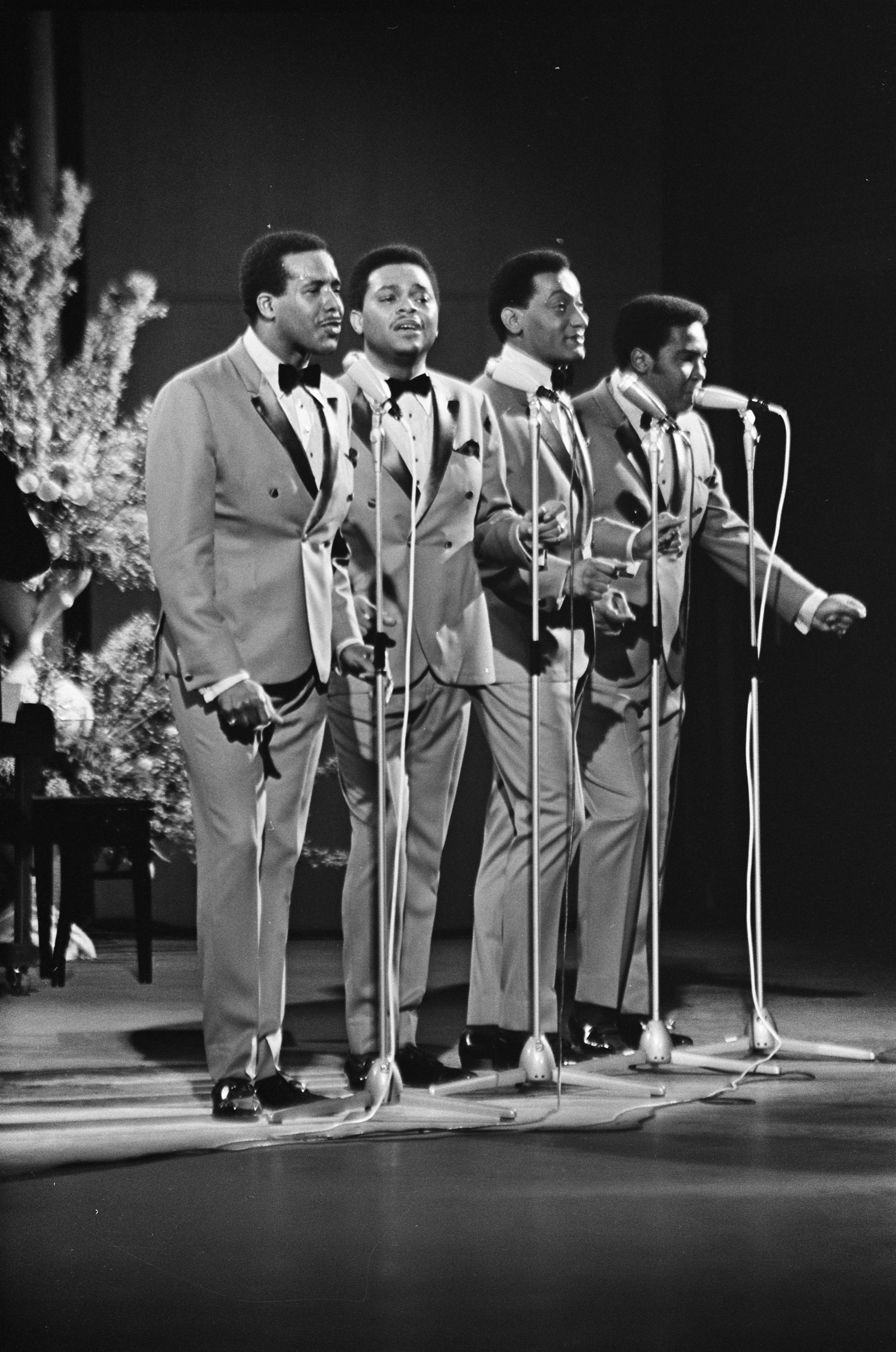
- Four Tops performing in 1968. From left: Levi Stubbs, Renaldo "Obie" Benson, Abdul "Duke" Fakir, and Lawrence Payton

Background information
- Also known as: The Four Aims; The Tops
- Origin: Detroit, Michigan, U.S.
- Genres: Soul; R&B; pop
- Works: Four Tops discography
- Years active: 1953–present
- Labels: Chess; Red Top; Riverside; Columbia; Motown; ABC-Dunhill; Casablanca; Arista
- Members: Theo Peoples; Ronnie McNeir; Lawrence Payton Jr.; Michael Brock
- Past members: Levi Stubbs; Duke Fakir; Renaldo Benson; Lawrence Payton; Harold Bonhart; Alexander Morris

The Four Tops is an American vocal group formed in Detroit, Michigan, in 1953 as the Four Aims. They were one of the most commercially successful American pop music groups of the 1960s and helped propel Motown Records to international fame. The group's repertoire has incorporated elements of soul, R&B, disco, adult contemporary, doo-wop, jazz, and show tunes. Lead singer Levi Stubbs, along with backing vocalists Abdul "Duke" Fakir, Renaldo "Obie" Benson and Lawrence Payton remained together in the group for more than four decades, performing until 1997 without a change in personnel. Along with fellow Motown groups the Miracles, the Marvelettes, Martha and the Vandellas, the Temptations, and the Supremes, the Four Tops helped to establish the "Motown sound"; pop-friendly soul and R&B with a clean, polished production quality. They were notable for having Stubbs, a baritone, as their lead singer, whereas most other male and mixed vocal groups of the time were fronted by tenors.

The group was the primary male vocal group for the highly successful songwriting and production team of Holland–Dozier–Holland, who wrote numerous hit singles for Motown. These included two Billboard Hot 100 number-one hits for the Tops: "I Can't Help Myself (Sugar Pie Honey Bunch)" in 1965 and "Reach Out I'll Be There" in 1966. The group continued to chart singles into the 1970s, including the million-seller "Ain't No Woman" (1973). The Four Tops were inducted into the Rock and Roll Hall of Fame in 1990, the Vocal Group Hall of Fame in 1999, and the National Rhythm & Blues Hall of Fame in 2013. In 2010, Rolling Stone ranked them number 79 on its list of the "100 Greatest Artists of All Time".

On July 20, 2024, the last surviving original member, Fakir, retired. He died two days later.

== History ==
=== Early years ===
All four members of the group began their careers together while they were high-school students in Detroit. At the insistence of their friends, Pershing High students Levi Stubbs and Abdul "Duke" Fakir performed with Renaldo "Obie" Benson and Lawrence Payton from Northern High at a local birthday party. The quartet decided to remain together and named the group the Four Aims. With the help of Payton's songwriter cousin Billy Davis, the Aims signed to Chess Records in 1956, changing their name to the Four Tops to avoid confusion with the Ames Brothers.

Over the next seven years, the Tops had unsuccessful tenures at Chess, Red Top, Riverside Records and Columbia Records. Without any hit records to their name, they toured frequently, developing a polished stage presence as an experienced supper club act, as well as supporting Billy Eckstine. In 1963, Berry Gordy, who had worked with Davis as a songwriter in the late 1950s, convinced the Tops to join the roster of his growing Motown record company.

=== Joining Motown ===
During their early Motown years, the Four Tops recorded jazz standards for the company's Workshop Jazz Records label. In addition, they sang backup on Motown singles by the Supremes ("Run, Run, Run", 1964), Martha and the Vandellas (on the 1966 hit "My Baby Loves Me") and others.

In 1964, Motown's main songwriting and production team, Holland–Dozier–Holland, created a complete instrumental track without any idea of what to do with it. They decided to craft the song as a more mainstream pop song for the Four Tops and proceeded to create "Baby I Need Your Loving" from the instrumental track. On its release in mid-1964, "Baby I Need Your Loving" made it to number 11 on the Billboard Hot 100.

The first follow-up single, "Without the One You Love (Life's Not Worth While)" (1964), just missed both the pop and R&B Top 40 charts, but "Ask the Lonely" (1965), written and produced by Motown A&R head William "Mickey" Stevenson with Ivy Jo Hunter, was a Top 30 pop hit and a Top 10 R&B hit in early 1965.

=== Success ===
After their first number 1 hit, "I Can't Help Myself (Sugar Pie, Honey Bunch)" in June 1965, the Four Tops released a long series of successful hit singles. Among the first wave of these hits were the Top 10 "It's the Same Old Song" (1965), "Something About You" (1965), "Shake Me, Wake Me (When It's Over)" (1966), and "Loving You Is Sweeter Than Ever" (1966).

Holland–Dozier–Holland wrote most of Stubbs' vocals in a tenor range, near the top of his range, in order to get a sense of strained urgency in his gospel preacher-inspired leads. They also wrote additional background vocals for a female group, the Andantes, on many of the songs, to add a high end to the low-voiced harmony of the Tops. Ivy Jo Hunter's "Loving You Is Sweeter Than Ever" (1966) was one of a few exceptions.

August 1966 brought the release of the Four Tops' all-time biggest hit and one of the most popular Motown songs ever. "Reach Out I'll Be There" reached number 1 on the U.S. pop and R&B charts and the UK chart and soon became the Tops' signature song. It was almost immediately followed by the similar-sounding "Standing in the Shadows of Love"; its depiction of heartbreak reflecting the opposite of the optimism in "Reach Out". It was another Top 10 hit for the Tops. The band recorded the first live album, Four Tops Live! at two dates in mid-1966 and Motown released the recording in November of that year.

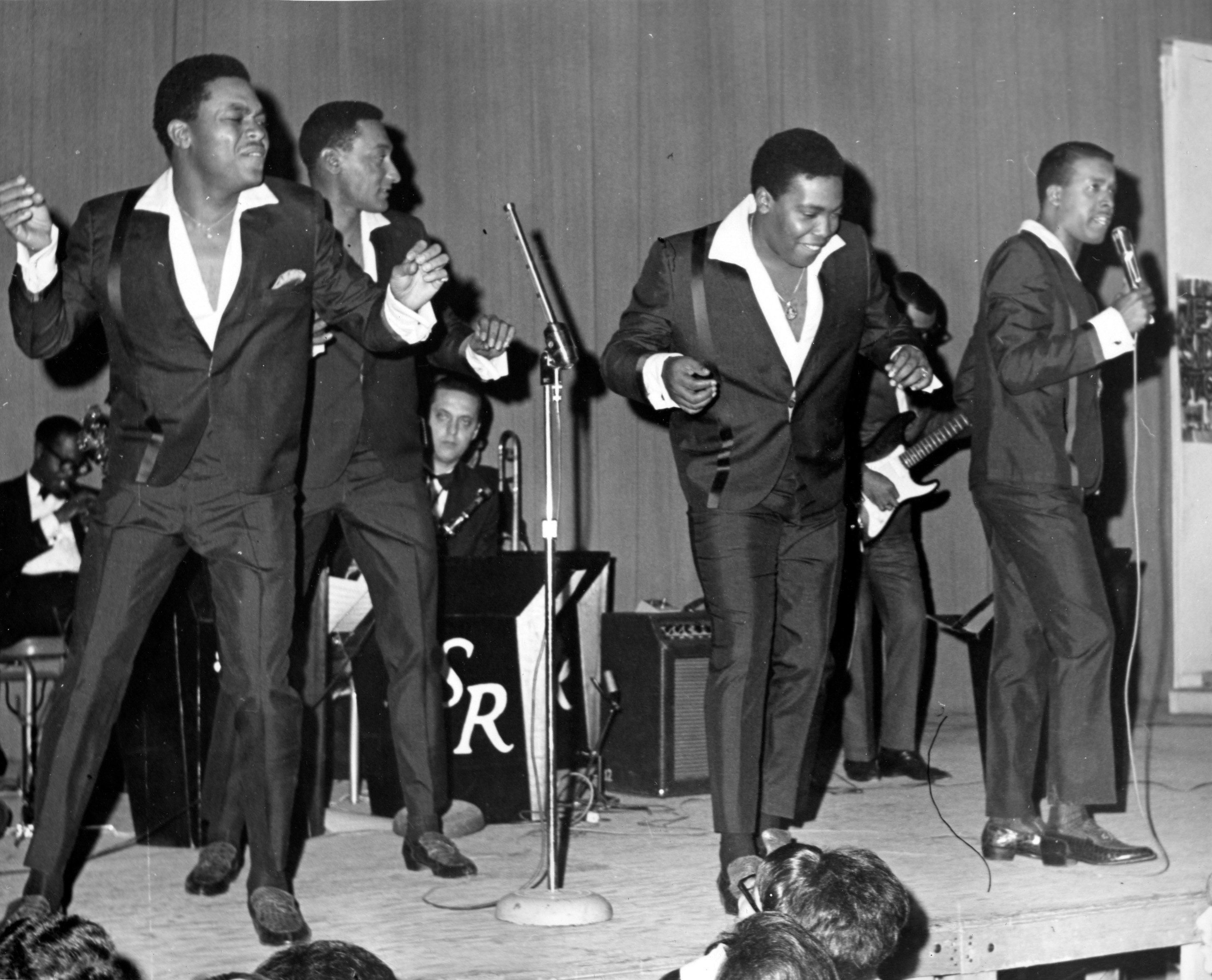
Performing at New Rochelle (New York) High School, c. 1967

The Top 10 U.S. hit "Bernadette" centered around a man's all-consuming obsession with his lover, continued the Four Tops' successful run into April 1967, followed by the Top 20 hits "7-Rooms of Gloom", and "You Keep Running Away". By now, the Tops were the most successful male Motown act in the United Kingdom (in the United States, they were second to the Temptations), and began experimenting with more mainstream pop hits. They scored hits with their versions of Tim Hardin's "If I Were a Carpenter" in late 1967 (mid-1968 in the U.S.) and the Left Banke's "Walk Away Renée" in early 1968. These singles and the original "I'm in a Different World" were their last hits produced by Holland–Dozier–Holland, who left Motown in 1967 after disputes with Berry Gordy Jr.

=== Late Motown period ===
Without Holland–Dozier–Holland, the hits became less frequent. The group worked with a wide array of Motown producers during the late 1960s, including Ivy Jo Hunter, Nickolas Ashford & Valerie Simpson, Norman Whitfield and Johnny Bristol, without significant chart success.

Their first major hit in a long time came in the form of 1970's "It's All in the Game", a pop Top 30/R&B Top Ten hit produced by Frank Wilson. Wilson and the Tops began working on a number of innovative tracks and albums together, echoing Whitfield's psychedelic soul work with the Temptations. Their 1970 album Still Waters Run Deep served as an inspiration for Marvin Gaye's 1971 classic album What's Going On, the title track of which was co-written by the Tops' Benson.

In addition to their own albums, the Tops were paired with The Supremes, who had just replaced lead singer Diana Ross with Jean Terrell, for a series of albums billed under the joint title The Magnificent 7 in 1970, and The Return of the Magnificent Seven and Dynamite! in 1971. While the albums themselves did not perform really well on the charts, The Magnificent 7 featured a Top 20 version of Ike & Tina Turner's "River Deep – Mountain High", produced by Ashford & Simpson.

The 1971 single "(A) Simple Game" was a Moody Blues cover and featured backing vocals from members of that band. The song did not fare well on the U.S. charts, but reached number three on the UK chart.

=== ABC/Dunhill Records and Casablanca Records ===
Motown as a company began to change during the early 1970s. Older acts such as Martha and the Vandellas and The Marvelettes were slowly moved aside or dropped to focus on newer acts, such as Michael Jackson and The Jackson 5, Rare Earth, and the now-solo Diana Ross. In addition, the company moved its operations from Detroit to Los Angeles, California, where Berry Gordy Jr. planned to break into the motion picture and television industries. In 1972, it was announced that the entire company would move west and that all its artists had to move as well. Many of the older Motown acts, already neglected by the label, opted to stay in Detroit, including The Funk Brothers studio backing band, Martha Reeves, and the Four Tops.

The Tops departed Motown for ABC-Dunhill, where they were assigned to writer-producers Dennis Lambert and Brian Potter and the label's head of A&R, Steve Barri as producer, with The Tops' own Lawrence Payton later also serving as a producer and writer. He also took over lead vocal duties on several tracks.

The group's first release on the label, "Keeper of the Castle" (1972) was their first pop Top 10 hit since "Bernadette" in 1967. Follow-ups included the 1973 million-selling "Ain't No Woman (Like the One I've Got)", also a top 10 pop hit and their third R&B number 1, and the Top 20 hit, "Are You Man Enough" (1973), (from the 1973 movie Shaft in Africa). "Sweet Understanding Love" (1973); "Midnight Flower (1974); and "One Chain Don't Make No Prison" (1974) all reached the R&B Top 10 between 1972 and 1974. Two ABC/Dunhill singles, 1974's "I Just Can't Get You Out of My Mind" and 1975's "Seven Lonely Nights" have become popular tunes in the southeast Beach/Shag Club Dance circuit.

After the release of "Catfish" (a top 10 R&B hit) in 1976, the major hits started to dry up and the Tops left ABC after an album recorded in Philadelphia with the MFSB musicians resulted in only minor chart success in 1978. The group disappeared from the recording scene until the early 1980s. Signing a deal with Casablanca Records, the Tops made a comeback in 1981 with the number 1 R&B hit "When She Was My Girl". Produced by David Wolfert, it just missed the Billboard pop Top 10, peaking at number 11. The group also scored a UK Top 10 hit with the song and had another hit there with the follow-up, "Don't Walk Away". In 1982, their song "Back to School Again" appeared in both the movie Grease 2 and its soundtrack.

=== Return to Motown ===
By 1983, The Tops had rejoined Motown, where their former ABC-Dunhill producer, Barri was vice-president of A&R. They were featured on the company's 1983 television special Motown 25: Yesterday, Today, Forever, taking part in one of the highlights of the show—a battle of the bands between The Tops and The Temptations, patterned after similar competitions Berry Gordy Jr. had staged during the 1960s. Stubbs and Temptation Otis Williams decided the Temptations/Tops battle would be a good one to take on the road, and both groups began semi-regular joint tours.

The first of The Tops' albums under their new Motown contract was Back Where I Belong (1983). A whole side of the album was produced by the Holland–Dozier–Holland production team, including the R&B Top 40 single "I Just Can't Walk Away". Only one more Tops album would be released by Motown, Magic in 1985. The lead single from that album, "Sexy Ways", was almost a Top 20 R&B hit, peaking at number 21 in mid-1985. In July of that year, the group performed at the Live Aid concert, singing five of their hit songs.

The group re-entered the studio in 1986 with producer Wolfert, who had previously produced them in many non-Motown releases. Despite working on the release for several months and issuing the single "Hot Nights" in July, the sessions did not result in a new album and the group signed to Arista Records in 1987. The title track of 1988's Indestructible was the group's final Top 40 hit, reaching number 35. It was also featured in the 1988 science-fiction cop film Alien Nation. Another track, "Loco in Acapulco", written and produced by British pop musician Phil Collins and former Motown composer-producer Lamont Dozier, climbed into the UK Top 10 and made number 7 in early 1989. The Arista contract provided an opportunity to pair Levi Stubbs with fellow Arista artist, another R&B vocalist from Detroit, Aretha Franklin, who was at the height of her own 1980s hit streak. This pairing resulted in the 1988 song "If Ever a Love There Was", which became a popular R&B and Adult Contemporary hit, as well as being featured on the soundtrack of the 1988 motion picture I'm Gonna Git You Sucka.

After completing their European tour in December 1988, the group was scheduled to return to the U.S. for Christmas on the ill-fated Pan Am Flight 103, which was destroyed over Lockerbie, Scotland, after a terrorist bomb was detonated on board. The group missed the flight due to a last-minute invite and prolonged filming of their performance at the British television show Top of the Pops; they instead took a later British Airways flight.

=== Later years ===
From the late 1980s, the Four Tops focused on touring and live performances. The group made guest appearances on labelmate Aretha Franklin's 1989 release Through the Storm and the 1992 Grover Washington Jr. album Next Exit, but they recorded only one album, returning again to Motown for 1995's Christmas Here with You. On June 20, 1997, 59-year-old Lawrence Payton died as a result of liver cancer, after singing for 44 years with the Four Tops who, unlike many other Motown groups, never had a single lineup change until then. At first, Stubbs, Benson and Fakir toured as a trio called The Tops. In 1998, they recruited former member of the Temptations Theo Peoples to restore the group to a quartet. By the turn of the century, Stubbs had become ill from cancer; Ronnie McNeir was recruited to fill the Lawrence Payton position and Peoples stepped into Stubbs' shoes as lead singer. Stubbs died on October 17, 2008, at his home in Detroit.

The group was featured in several television specials during this time, including Motown 45, and several by PBS, including a 50th-anniversary concert dedicated to the group (available on DVD). The concert featured a brief appearance of Stubbs using a wheelchair, and a memorial to Payton announced by Benson. Benson appeared on one more PBS special and died on July 1, 2005 from lung cancer. He was replaced by Payton's son, Lawrence Jr. The final PBS special, titled Motown: The Early Years, featured a message of Benson's passing following the credits.

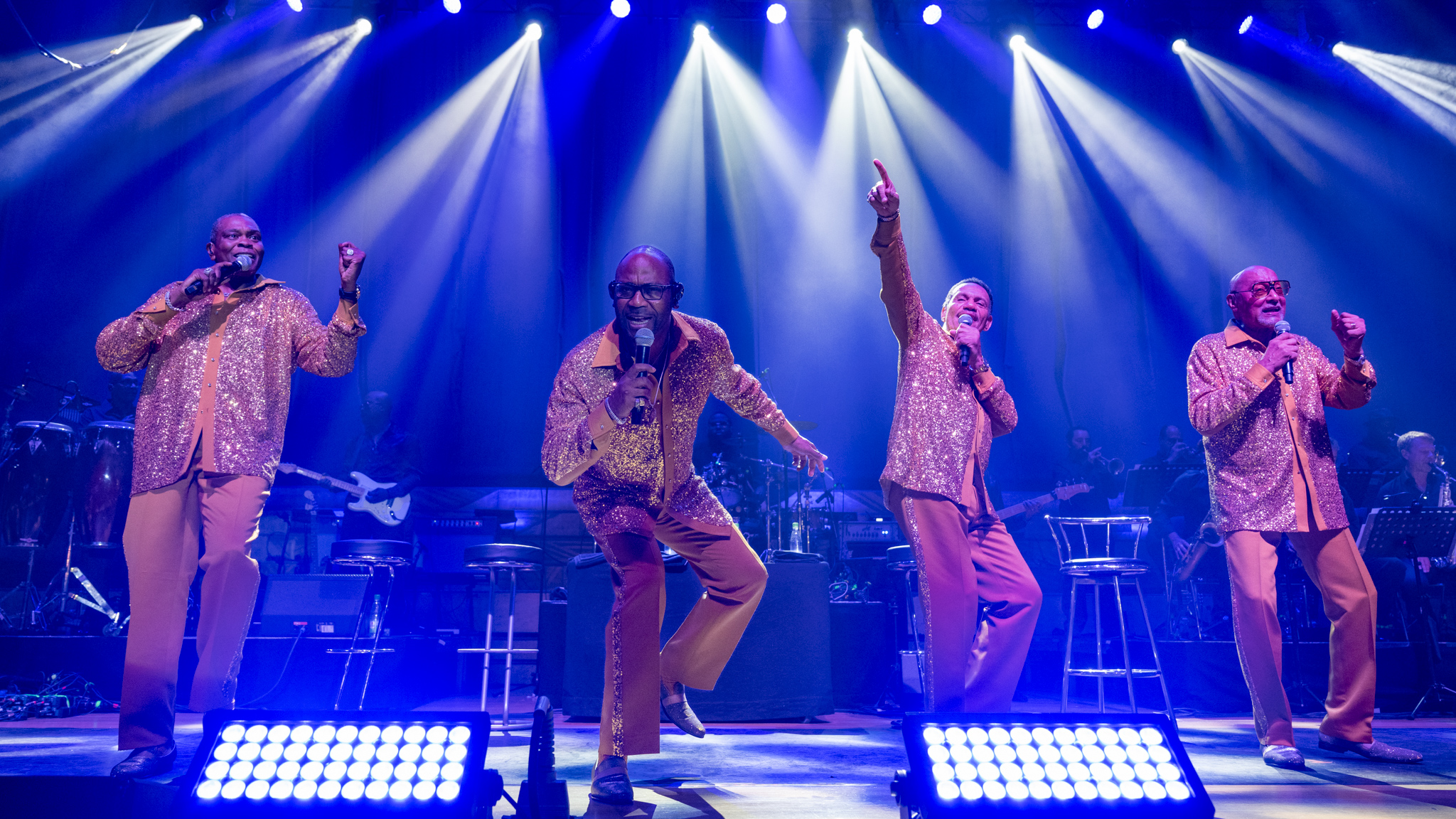
Four Tops in 2022, left to right: Alexander Morris, Lawrence Payton Jr., Ronnie McNeir and Duke Fakir

The group was inducted into the Rock and Roll Hall of Fame in 1990, and into the Vocal Group Hall of Fame in 1999. In 2004, Rolling Stone ranked them number 79 on their list of the 100 Greatest Artists of All Time. The Four Tops were inducted into the Michigan Rock and Roll Legends Hall of Fame in 2005.

The Four Tops sang the National Anthem before the start of game 5 for the 2011 baseball American League Championship Series (ALCS) between the Texas Rangers and Detroit Tigers on October 13, 2011, in Detroit, Michigan. When singing the last line of "The Star-Spangled Banner", "... and the home of the brave", they quickly sang the words "Ain't No Country Like the One I Got", before singing the last word, "brave". The Four Tops were honored with an induction into the Rhythm & Blues Hall of Fame at the Inaugural ceremony held at Cleveland State University's Waetejen Auditorium on Saturday August 17, 2013.

=== The Four Tops career awards ===
The Four Tops have won many awards, including the following:

- Rock and Roll Hall of Fame (1990)
- Vocal Group Hall of Fame (1999)
- Hollywood Walk of Fame (1997)
- Grammy Hall of Fame (Reach Out I'll Be There – 1998)("I Can't Help Myself (Sugar Pie Honey Bunch-2018)
- Grammy Lifetime Achievement Award (2009 – 51st Annual Grammy Awards)
- Rhythm and Blues Foundation Pioneer Award (1997)
- Billboard magazine Top 100 Artists of All Time (number 77)
- Rhythm & Blues Hall of Fame Induction (2013)
- 100 Greatest Artists of All Time (number 79 – Rolling Stone)
- Rolling Stone's 500 Greatest Songs of All Time (2003)
- Michigan Rock and Roll Legends Hall of Fame
- Grammy Lifetime Achievement Award

== Personnel ==
=== Current members ===
- Theo Peoples – lead vocals (2000–2010; 2025–present); second tenor vocals (1998–2000)
- Ronnie McNeir – second tenor vocals (1999–present)
- Lawrence Payton Jr. – bass-baritone vocals (2005–present)
- Michael Brock – first tenor vocals (2024–present)

=== Former members ===
- Levi Stubbs – lead vocals (1953–2000, 2004; died 2008)
- Abdul "Duke" Fakir – first tenor vocals (1953–2024; died 2024)
- Renaldo "Obie" Benson – bass-baritone vocals (1953–2005; his death)
- Lawrence Payton – second tenor vocals (1953–1997; his death)
- Harold "Spike" Bonhart – lead vocals (2010–2018)
- Alexander Morris – lead vocals (2018–2025)

=== Lineups ===
1953–1997	1997–1998	1998–2000
Abdul "Duke" Fakir - first tenor; Levi Stubbs - lead tenor; Lawrence Payton - second tenor; Renaldo "Obie" Benson - bass/baritone	Abdul "Duke" Fakir - first tenor; Levi Stubbs - lead tenor; Renaldo "Obie" Benson - bass/baritone	Adbul "Duke" Fakir - first tenor; Levi Stubbs - lead tenor; Theo Peoples - second tenor; Renaldo "Obie" Benson - bass/baritone
2000–2005	2005–2010	2010–2018
Abdul "Duke" Fakir - first tenor; Ronnie McNeir - second tenor; Theo Peoples - lead tenor; Renaldo "Obie" Benson - bass/baritone	Abdul "Duke" Fakir - first tenor; Ronnie McNeir- second tenor; Theo Peoples - lead tenor; Lawrence Payton Jr. - bass/baritone	Abdul "Duke" Fakir - first tenor; Ronnie McNeir - second tenor; Harold "Spike" Bonhart - lead tenor; Lawrence Payton Jr. - bass/baritone
2018–2024	2024–2025	2025–present
Abdul "Duke" Fakir - first tenor; Ronnie McNeir - second tenor; Alexander Morris - lead tenor; Lawrence Payton Jr. - bass/baritone	Michael Brock - first tenor; Ronnie McNeir - second tenor; Alexander Morris - lead tenor; Lawrence Payton Jr. - bass/baritone	Michael Brock - first tenor; Ronnie McNeir - second tenor; Theo Peoples - lead tenor; Lawrence Payton Jr. - bass/baritone

== Discography ==
- Four Tops (1965)
- Four Tops Second Album (1965)
- On Top (1966)
- On Broadway (1967)
- Reach Out (1967)
- Yesterday's Dreams (1968)
- Four Tops Now! (1969)
- Soul Spin (1969)
- Still Waters Run Deep (1970)
- Changing Times (1970)
- The Magnificent 7 (with The Supremes) (1970)
- The Return of the Magnificent Seven (with The Supremes) (1971)
- Dynamite (with The Supremes) (1971)
- Nature Planned It (1972)
- Keeper of the Castle (1972)
- Main Street People (1973)
- Meeting of the Minds (1974)
- Night Lights Harmony (1975)
- Catfish (1976)
- The Show Must Go On (1977)
- At the Top (1978)
- Tonight! (1981)
- One More Mountain (1982)
- Back Where I Belong (1983)
- Magic (1985)
- Indestructible (1988)
- Christmas Here with You (1995)

== See also ==
- List of best-selling music artists
