= Levi Stubbs =

American R&B singer (1936–2008)

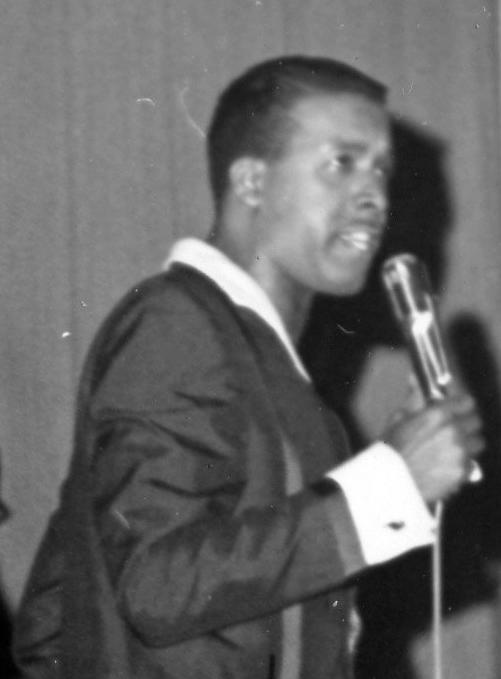
- Stubbs performing in 1967

Background information
- Born: Levi Stubbles; June 6, 1936; Detroit, Michigan, U.S.
- Died: October 17, 2008 (aged 72) Detroit, Michigan, U.S.
- Genres: R&B, soul
- Occupations: Singer, actor
- Years active: 1953–2000, 2004
- Label: Motown
- Formerly of: Four Tops

Levi Stubbs (born Levi Stubbles, June 6, 1936 – October 17, 2008) was an American baritone singer, widely known as the lead vocalist of the R&B group the Four Tops, that released a variety of Motown hit records during the 1960s and 1970s. He was noted for his powerful, emotional, and dramatic singing style. In 1990, Stubbs was inducted into the Rock and Roll Hall of Fame as a member of the Four Tops.

Stubbs was also a voice artist in film and television, and provided the voice of "Audrey II", the alien plant in the 1986 musical horror comedy film Little Shop of Horrors (an adaption of the stage musical of the same name), as well as Mother Brain in the 1989 TV series Captain N: The Game Master. Stubbs was admired by his peers for his impressive vocal range and influenced many later pop and soul artists, such as Daryl Hall of Hall and Oates.

Stubbs was born and spent much of his life in Detroit, Michigan. He had five children with his wife Clineice Stubbs, to whom he was married for almost 50 years. His last performance was at the Four Tops' "50th Anniversary Concert" on July 28, 2004, at the Detroit Opera House.

== Early life and music career ==
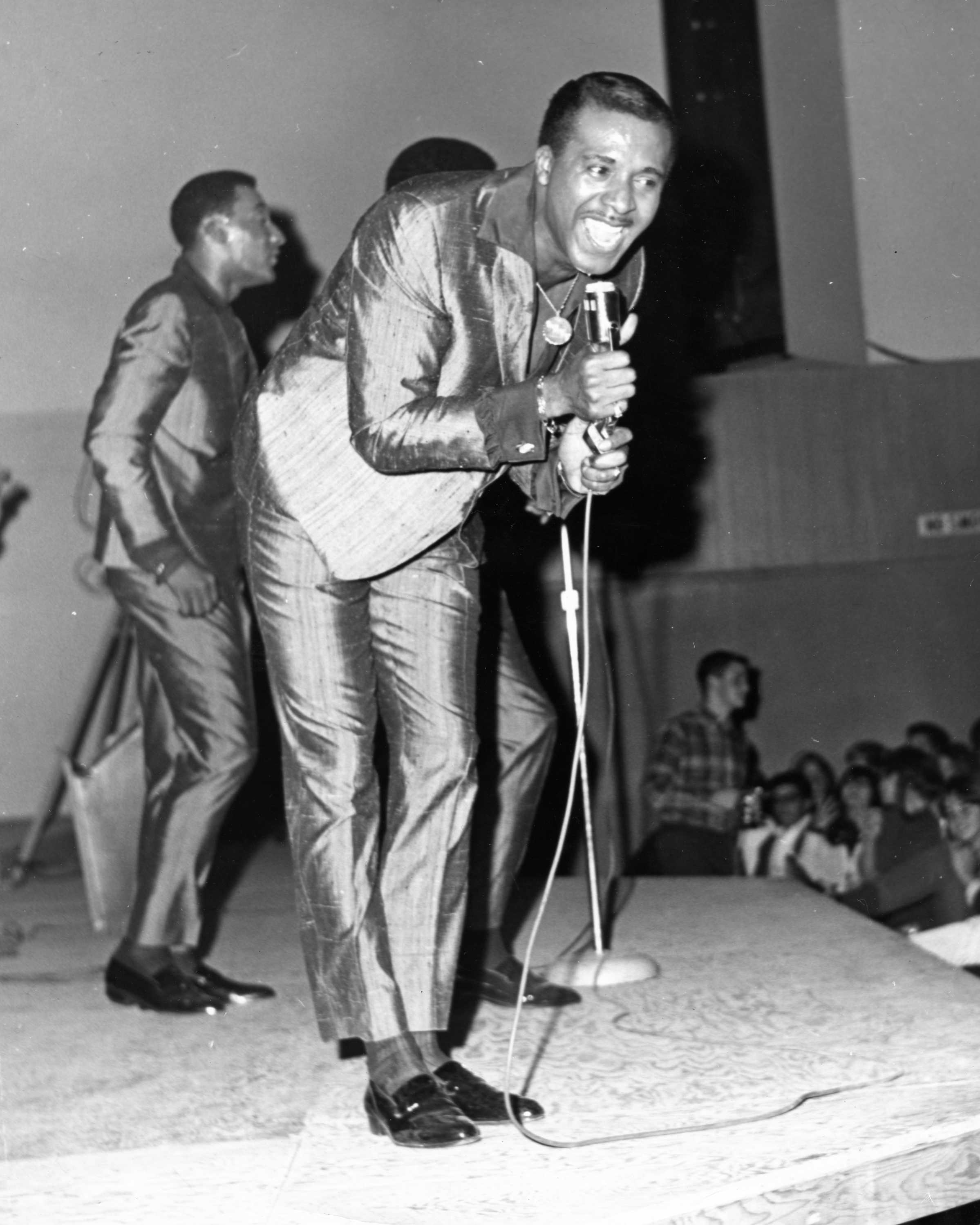
Stubbs performing at New Rochelle High School in 1966

Born in 1936 in Detroit, Michigan, Stubbs had a brother, Joe, who later became a member of 100 Proof (Aged in Soul), The Falcons, The Contours and The Originals. His cousin was Jackie Wilson. Stubbs attended Detroit Pershing High School, where he met Abdul "Duke" Fakir. He began his professional singing career with friends Fakir, Renaldo "Obie" Benson and Lawrence Payton, forming a singing group called the Four Aims in 1954.

Two years later, after signing with Chess Records, the group changed their name to the Four Tops. The name change was meant to avoid confusion with the then-popular Ames Brothers. The Four Tops began as a supper-club act before signing to Motown Records in 1963. By the end of the decade, they had over a dozen hits. The most popular of their hits (all of which featured Stubbs on lead vocals) include "Ask the Lonely", "Baby I Need Your Loving", "I Can't Help Myself (Sugar Pie, Honey Bunch)", "It's the Same Old Song", "I'll Turn to Stone", "Reach Out I'll Be There", "Standing in the Shadows of Love", "Bernadette", "Still Water (Love)", "Ain't No Woman (Like the One I've Got)", as well as the late hit "Loco In Acapulco".

Despite being the most prominent member of the group, Stubbs refused to have separate billing (in contrast to other Motown acts such as Smokey Robinson and the Miracles and Diana Ross and the Supremes), and he also turned down several offers for a solo career, out of loyalty to his bandmates. Stubbs and the other Tops remained a team until Lawrence Payton died in 1997, at which point Theo Peoples took his place. The Four Tops were inducted into the Rock and Roll Hall of Fame in 1990 and the National Rhythm & Blues Hall of Fame in 2013. They have sold over 50 million records worldwide.

During the band's long career it was signed to the Motown, ABC Dunhill, Arista and Casablanca record labels, and Stubbs' vocals influenced many later pop and soul artists, such as Daryl Hall of Hall and Oates. Hall has remarked that Stubbs' "unique" style rendered the Four Tops' material "timeless". Other musical peers expressing admiration for the Four Tops' work include Lonnie Jordan of War and Smokey Robinson of The Miracles, among many others.

In 2000, Theo Peoples replaced Stubbs as lead singer after Stubbs suffered a stroke, with Ronnie McNeir taking the place that Lawrence Payton originally held. Renaldo Benson died on July 1, 2005, leaving Duke Fakir as the only surviving member of the Four Tops' original lineup until his death in July 2024. Stubbs' final performance with the Four Tops was at the group's "50th Anniversary Concert" on July 28, 2004, at the Detroit Opera House.

=== Voice acting ===
Stubbs provided the voice of the carnivorous plant Audrey II in the 1986 film version of the musical Little Shop of Horrors. One of the songs he sang for the film, "Mean Green Mother from Outer Space", was nominated for an Oscar. He also was the voice of Mother Brain in the animated TV series Captain N: The Game Master (1989), using the same voice.

Stubbs also guest-starred in a number of TV shows as himself. Berry Gordy offered him the role of Louis McKay in the 1972 film Lady Sings the Blues, which would have starred him opposite Diana Ross as Billie Holiday. Stubbs turned the role down, however, once again not wishing to overshadow the other members of the Four Tops.

== Reputation ==
Stubbs has been regarded by some as one of the quintessential male soul singers. According to AllMusic's Ed Hogan, Stubbs had a "pleading urgency in his voice that perfectly captured the longing anxiousness of the songs written by the producing trio of Holland-Dozier-Holland". War band member Lonnie Jordan later told Billboard.com he felt "blessed" to meet Stubbs, and thought that the Four Tops singer's "voice was so good he was just, like, from another planet."

== Personal life ==
Stubbs and his wife Clineice were married for 48 years from 1960 until his death in 2008. The couple had five children along with eleven grandchildren and ten great-grandchildren. Clineice passed away on October 28,2026.

== Death ==
Stubbs was diagnosed with cancer in 1995, and after suffering a stroke in 2000, he was no longer able to tour with the Four Tops. He died in his sleep on October 17, 2008, at his home in Detroit. A memorial service for Stubbs was held at the Greater Grace Temple in Detroit on October 27. Many of Stubbs' friends from the music industry attended including Berry Gordy, Martha Reeves, Brian Holland, Ali-Ollie Woodson and Dennis Edwards. Detroit City Council member JoAnn Watson, along with Martha Reeves, presented a resolution naming Stubbs' birthday "Levi Stubbs Day" in Detroit. Stubbs is interred at Detroit's historic Woodlawn Cemetery.

== Cultural references ==
Stubbs features in Billy Bragg's 1986 song "Levi Stubbs' Tears", about a woman whose Four Tops cassette brings her comfort through difficult times.

== Filmography ==
=== Film ===
| Year | Title | Role | Notes |
|---|---|---|---|
| 1986 | Little Shop of Horrors | Audrey II; Black Resident | Voice; credited as Levi Stubbs of The Four Tops |

=== Television ===
| Year | Title | Role | Notes |
|---|---|---|---|
| 1989–1991 | Captain N: The Game Master | Mother Brain | Voice; credited as Levi Stubbs Jr. (final appearance) |

== Soundtrack ==
| Year | Artist/Writer | Song | Film |
|---|---|---|---|
| 1986 | Howard Ashman & Alan Menken | "Feed Me (Git It)" "Suppertime" "Mean Green Mother from Outer Space" | Little Shop of Horrors |
| 2003 | Lamont Dozier, Brian & Eddie Holland | "I Can't Help Myself (Sugar Pie Honey Bunch)" | Queer as Folk |
