= Renaldo Benson =

American musician (1936–2005)

Renaldo "Obie" Benson
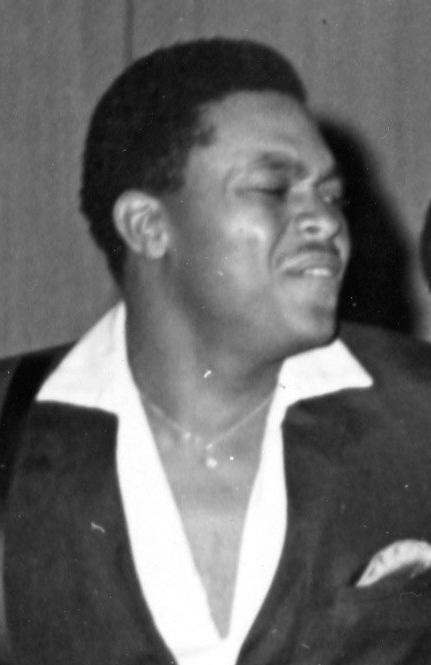
- Benson in 1967

Background information
- Also known as: Obie Benson
- Born: Renaldo Benson; June 14, 1936
- Died: July 1, 2005 (aged 69)
- Genres: R&B; rock and roll
- Occupation: Singer-songwriter
- Years active: 1953–2005
- Labels: Chess; Riverside; Columbia; Motown
- Formerly of: The Four Tops

Renaldo "Obie" Benson (June 14, 1936 – July 1, 2005) was an American soul and R&B singer and songwriter. He was best known as a founding member and the bass singer of Motown group the Four Tops, which he joined in 1953 and continued to perform with for over five decades, until April 8, 2005.

He also co-wrote "What's Going On" which became a No. 2 hit for Marvin Gaye in 1971, and which Rolling Stone rated as No. 4 on their List of Rolling Stone's 500 Greatest Songs of All Time released in 2004.

== Early life and education ==
Renaldo Benson was born in Detroit, Michigan on June 14, 1936. Benson attended Northern High School in Detroit, Michigan with Lawrence Payton.

== The Four Tops ==
=== Formation: 1953–1964 ===
The pair met Levi Stubbs and Abdul "Duke" Fakir while singing at a friend's birthday party in 1954 and decided to form a group called the Four Aims. Roquel Billy Davis, who was Payton's cousin, was a fifth member of the group for a time and a songwriter for the group. Davis played an instrumental role in the group being signed by Chess Records who were mainly interested in Davis' songwriting ability. The group changed their name to the Four Tops to avoid confusion with the Ames Brothers and had one single "Kiss Me Baby" released through Chess which failed to chart. The Four Tops left Chess although Davis stayed with the company.

The group then went to Red Top Records and Riverside Records before signing with Columbia Records where they released "Ain't That Love" in 1960. This record was a supper club style record and the Four Tops would sing at a number of jazz venues in the early 1960s. Benson was responsible for the Tops' choreography in the early years of the group.

=== Career success: 1964–2005 ===
In 1963 they signed with Motown, initially recording a track for Motown's Workshop Jazz label. Benson and the other members already knew Barrett Strong, as he had written songs with Davis for Jackie Wilson including "Lonely Teardrops". The Four Tops worked with Holland-Dozier-Holland who wrote and produced a number of soul music hits for them over the next few years, including "I Can't Help Myself (Sugar Pie, Honey Bunch)" and "Reach Out I'll Be There" which both topped the US pop charts.

After Holland-Dozier-Holland left Motown in 1967, the hits became less frequent for the Four Tops. When Motown left Detroit for Los Angeles in 1972, the Four Tops signed with ABC-Dunhill, and had Top 10 pop hits with "Keeper of the Castle" and "Ain't No Woman Like the One I've Got", their first Top 10 hits since "Bernadette" in 1967. While the Four Tops enjoyed a number of R&B hits in the next couple of years, the hits dried up again as disco became popular.

In 1981, The Four Tops returned to the R&B charts with a No. 1 hit in "When She Was My Girl" on Casablanca Records. The group returned to Motown for the Motown 25 special in 1983, and recorded a couple of albums before leaving for Arista Records. Benson appeared with the rest of the Four Tops on Aretha Franklin's 1989 album Through the Storm.

=== Hall of Fame induction: 1990–2013 ===
Benson was admitted as a member of the Four Tops to the Rock and Roll Hall of Fame in 1990. The group would be awarded a star on the Hollywood Walk of Fame in 1997, followed by the Vocal Group Hall of Fame in 1999, and in 2013 into the National Rhythm & Blues Hall of Fame

Until the death of Lawrence Payton in 1997, the Four Tops had the same membership for over forty years. Former Temptation Theo Peoples joined the group in 1998. Peoples soon became the lead vocalist, as Levi Stubbs fell ill, and Ronnie McNeir took Payton's place. Benson continued to tour extensively as part of the Four Tops, spending a third of the year on tour. The group would often tour with The Temptations as part of a double bill.

His last performance as a Four Top was on April 8, 2005, on the Late Show with David Letterman.

== "What's Going On" ==
Benson was on tour with the Four Tops when he witnessed the assault of protesters by the police in Berkeley over a disused urban lot which the protesters called People's Park. When he returned to Detroit after the tour ended, the experience inspired Benson to start writing the first draft of "What's Going On". He worked on the song with lyricist Al Cleveland, who was renting the upstairs section of Benson's duplex.

Benson wanted the Four Tops to record his song, but they refused on the grounds that it was a protest song. He approached Joan Baez to record the song while appearing on a British television show, but she declined. Finally, he approached Marvin Gaye, who liked the song, but wanted The Originals to cut a version of it.

Benson eventually persuaded Gaye to record the song by offering him a cut of the royalties. Gaye added lyrics and other touches to the song, and recorded it in June 1970. Motown refused to release it at first, claiming it was uncommercial. Finally, the song was released and reached No. 2 on the Billboard Pop Singles chart, while topping the R&B chart. "What's Going On" is widely acknowledged as one of the greatest rock or R&B songs of all time, reaching the top 5 of the "500 Greatest Songs of All Time" as rated by Rolling Stone in 2004 and as one of The Rock and Roll Hall of Fame's 500 Songs that Shaped Rock and Roll.

== Death ==
When Benson's leg was amputated in early 2005 due to circulation problems, doctors discovered cancer in his lungs. Benson went into cardiac arrest and died of lung cancer and other illnesses on July 1, 2005. He is survived by two daughters. Lawrence "Roquel" Payton, Jr. replaced Benson as a member of the Four Tops with Abdul Fakir remaining as the only original member. After Fakir's death, Payton, Jr. who is a legacy member of the group, has taken control.

== Legacy ==
Benson was admitted as a member of the Four Tops to the Rock and Roll Hall of Fame in 1990. The group would be awarded a star on the Hollywood Walk of Fame in 1997, followed by the Vocal Group Hall of Fame in 1999.

Benson is interred at Woodlawn Cemetery. Media coverage of Benson's death was almost completely overshadowed by that of another R&B star, Luther Vandross, who also died on the same day.

== Notes ==
- Allmusic.com article on Renaldo Benson
- History of Rock article on the Four Tops
- Ben Edmonds, What's Going On?: What's Going On and the Last Days of the Motown Sound Canongate US 2003 ISBN 1-84195-314-8 on the recording of "What's Going On?"
- Rolling Stone article on "What's Going On" as part of its 500 Greatest Songs of All Time article

=== Obituaries ===
- ABC News America article on Benson's death
- Washington Post article on Benson's death
- Washington Times obituary
- Detroit News Susan Whitall's Remembrance
- Funeral Photo Gallery: Renaldo "Obie" Benson
