= Duke Fakir =

American singer (1935–2024)

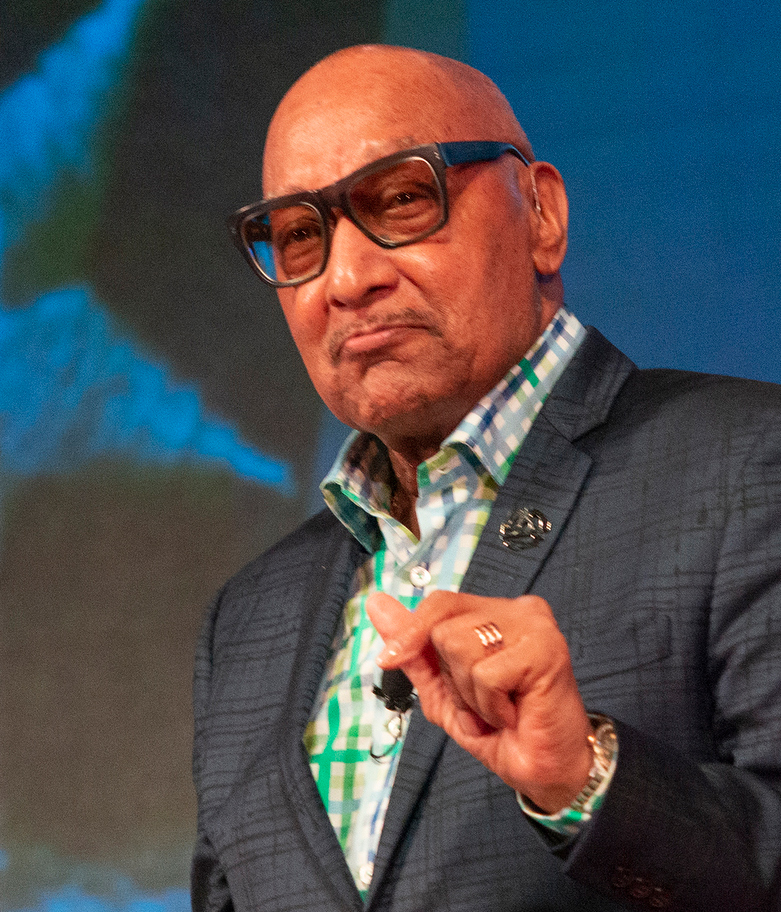
- Fakir at the LBJ Presidential Library in 2019

Background information
- Born: Abdul Kareem Fakir; December 26, 1935; Detroit, Michigan, U.S.
- Died: July 22, 2024 (aged 88) Detroit, Michigan, U.S.
- Genres: Soul; R&B; pop
- Occupation: Singer
- Years active: 1953–2024
- Member of: The Four Tops

Abdul Kareem "Duke" Fakir (December 26, 1935 – July 22, 2024) was an American singer. He co-founded the Motown quartet the Four Tops and performed in an ensemble under that name from 1953 until shortly before his death. He was the group's last surviving original member.

== Biography ==
Fakir was born on December 26, 1935, in Detroit, Michigan. His father was a factory worker who came from what is now Bangladesh. His mother was an African American from Sparta, Georgia. Fakir attended Detroit's Pershing High School, where he played basketball and football, and ran track. He first met fellow band member Levi Stubbs through neighborhood football games; at that time he was not aware Stubbs was a singer. Later, attending a variety show featuring the Lucky Millinder band, the band announced a talented young singer whom Fakir recognized as the boy he played football with. They became closer friends and Stubbs even traveled with Fakir to his sporting events, where they enjoyed singing and engaging teammates in sing-alongs.

With their shared love of singing, they tried working with a few other singers, then decided to ask Lawrence Payton and Renaldo "Obie" Benson. They invited Payton and Benson to join them at a party hosted by the Shahrazads, a local "it girl" club. When invited by the girls to sing, they decided Stubbs would take the lead and they would back him up. The group and party-goers enjoyed their sound so much, that they decided to begin rehearsing together. They originally gave themselves the name "The Four Aims", to describe their goals of achieving something great. But at their first recording session with Chess Records in Chicago, they were reminded that the Ames Brothers was a very popular singing quartet, and it was suggested that they change their own name to avoid confusion. After some discussion, their musical director Maurice King suggested the name the Four Tops, to go along with their original goal of shooting for the stars and reaching the top.

They became a popular local performing group, but recording success eluded them until they signed with the newly established Motown Records in 1963. They soon became one of the biggest recording groups of the 1960s, with 14 charted hits through the early 1980s. They are listed at number 77 in Billboard magazine "Top 100 Artists Of All Time". Fakir was a guest on the "Not My Job" segment of the NPR radio show Wait Wait…Don't Tell Me broadcast on January 21, 2012. In 2022, Fakir's memoir I'll Be There: My Life With The Four Tops was published. A musical based on the book, also titled I'll Be There, premiered the same year in Detroit.

By 2008, the other three Tops had died; Fakir controlled the Four Tops intellectual properties and was responsible for assembling the touring version of the band that would carry on the group's legacy. He had stated an intention never to retire and indeed continued to tour with the group until less than a month before his death. Shortly before his death, he named Michael Brock as his successor.

== Personal life ==
Fakir lived in the Palmer Park section of Detroit with his second wife Piper Gibson, who he was married to for 50 years. As of 2024, he had seven children (one of them having preceded him in death), 13 grandchildren, and nine great-grandchildren.

Fakir attributed his upbringing in Detroit as a strong influence in his choice to pursue his music career. Detroit is "full of churches. It's one of those cities in which gospel music has always been prevalent, jazz music had always been prevalent. Back in the day this was a jazz town... And when I was born we went to church, just like a couple of the other guys, so we sang all our lives pretty much... my mother worked at church and my cousins and I, we all went to choir, we grew up there." Both Renaldo Benson and Fakir received scholarships to attend the same college and were preparing to enter. However, the group received their first professional singing engagement during the summer of 1954 in Flint, Michigan, took a gamble, and decided to pursue their music career instead.

After the group had completed their tour of Europe in December 1988, Fakir and the other Tops were originally scheduled to return to the U.S. from London via the Pan Am Flight 103, which crashed over Lockerbie, Scotland, after a terrorist bomb was detonated on the plane, killing all on board. They missed the flight due to a prolonged filming of their performance on the British television show Top of the Pops.

Fakir was close friends with fellow Motown artist Mary Wilson of the Supremes until her death in 2021. The two were romantically linked and briefly engaged in 1964; however, their music careers were still developing and they decided it would be best to call it off. They appeared on Chicago's You and Me This Morning in 2013 to promote the Mary Wilson Holiday Spectacular With Special Guests The Four Tops. At the show they performed "Baby, It's Cold Outside" together.

In January 2023, it was reported that the U.S. Treasury Department was seeking $500,000 in unpaid taxes from Fakir.

Fakir died of heart failure at his Detroit home on July 22, 2024, at the age of 88.

== Awards and achievements ==
As a member of the Four Tops, Fakir was inducted into the Rock and Roll Hall of Fame in 1990, received a star on the Hollywood Walk of Fame in 1997, was inducted into the Vocal Group Hall of Fame in 1999, the Grammy Hall of Fame in 2018, received the Grammy Lifetime Achievement Award in 2009, and was included in the Billboard magazine Top 100 Recording Artists of All Time. The group was inducted into National Rhythm & Blues Hall of Fame in 2013.
