= Lawrence Payton =

American singer-songwriter (1938–1997)

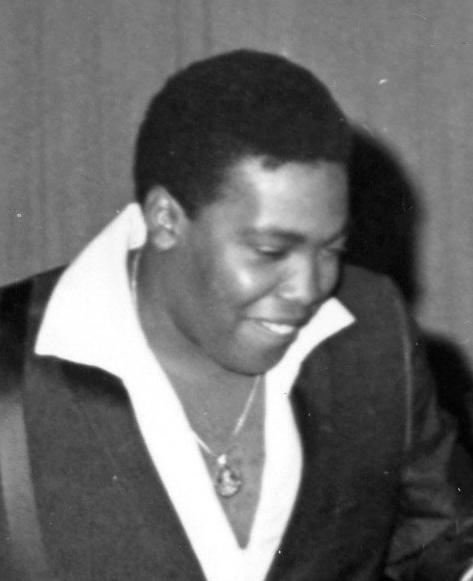
- Payton performing in 1967

Background information
- Born: Lawrence Albert Payton; March 2, 1938; Detroit, Michigan, U.S.
- Died: June 20, 1997 (aged 59) Southfield, Michigan, U.S.
- Occupations: Musician, record producer
- Years active: 1953–1997
- Formerly of: Four Tops
- Relatives: Billy Davis (cousin)

Lawrence Albert Payton Sr. (March 2, 1938 – June 20, 1997) was an American tenor, songwriter, vocal arranger, musician, and record producer for the popular Motown quartet, the Four Tops.

== Career ==
Payton and Obie Benson both attended Northern High School in Detroit and met Levi Stubbs and Duke Fakir at a school birthday party. The four teenagers began singing in 1953 as The Four Aims but later changed their name to the Four Tops to avoid confusion with the Ames Brothers. With the help of Payton's songwriter cousin Billy Davis, the Aims signed to Chess Records in 1956. Although successful in the local area as a performance group, recording success eluded them until signing with the newly established Motown label in 1963. They then became one of the biggest recording acts of the 1960s, charting more than two dozen hits through the early 1980s.

Payton is credited for the vocal arrangements and the "smooth seamless harmony" of the Four Tops' sound. He also sang lead on several songs such as the 1975 single "We All Gotta Stick Together", "Feel Free" (from the Catfish album) and "Love Feels Like Fire" and "Until You Love Someone" (from their Motown days), but he was often overshadowed as lead by the more popular Stubbs. Stubbs praised Payton's contribution saying, "He could pick notes out of the air. He had that gift. He was responsible for our harmonies."

== Personal life ==
The original Four Tops enjoyed continued success as a headline performance act and remained together for 43 years until Payton's death on June 20, 1997, from liver cancer in Southfield, Michigan aged 59. He was interred in Detroit's Woodlawn Cemetery.

Payton had 11 children. One of his sons, Lawrence Jr., nicknamed "Roquel", went on to sing with the Four Tops who continue to perform as of 2026, and still featuring original member Duke Fakir until his death in 2024.

== Accolades ==
As a member of the Four Tops, Payton was inducted into the Rock and Roll Hall of Fame in 1990, received a star on the Hollywood Walk of Fame shortly before his death in 1997, was posthumously inducted into the Vocal Group Hall of Fame in 1999, the Grammy Hall of Fame in 1998, received the Grammy Lifetime Achievement Award in 2009, and was ranked at number 77 in the Billboard magazine Top 100 Recording Artists of All Time. 2013 the group was inducted into the National Rhythm & Blues Hall of Fame
