= Catfish (disambiguation) =

Catfish are a group of primarily freshwater fish.

Catfish may also refer to:

- Ictaluridae, a family of catfish native to North America
  - Ictalurus, a genus of North American freshwater catfishes

== Places ==
- Catfish Creek (disambiguation), United States and Canada
- Catfish Mountain, New Jersey, United States

== Film and television ==
- Catfish (film), a 2010 film about a New York photographer engaged in an online romance
  - Catfish: The TV Show, an MTV program debuting in November 2012, based on the film
- "The Catfish" (The Amazing World of Gumball), a television episode

== Music ==
- Catfish Records, a British record label of the early 20th century
- Catfish (band), a band fronted by Don Walker
- Catfish (album), a 1976 album by Four Tops
- "Catfish" (Bob Dylan song), a song about Catfish Hunter on Dylan's The Bootleg Series Volumes 1–3 (Rare & Unreleased) 1961–1991
- "Catfish" (Four Tops song) (1976)
- "Catfish" (Tamar Braxton song) (2015)
- ”Catfish”, by Doechii (2024)
- "catfish", by Matt Proxy
- Catfish and the Bottlemen, Welsh indie rock band

== People ==
- James W. "Catfish" Cole (1924–1967), a leader of the Ku Klux Klan of North Carolina and South Carolina
- Catfish Collins (1944–2010), rhythm guitarist
- Catfish Hunter (1946–1999), American Major League Baseball pitcher
- Catfish Keith (born 1962), blues singer/songwriter Keith Daniel Kozacik
- Catfish McDaris (born 1953), American poet and author
- Catfish Metkovich (1920–1995), American Major League Baseball player
- Milburn Smith (1912–1994), American college football and basketball coach and All-American football player
- Vernon Smith (American football) (1908–1988), American college football, basketball and baseball player and basketball coach
- Catfish Billy (born 1979), alias of the American rapper Yelawolf

== Other uses ==
- Catfish, a label for various fluorescence in situ hybridization (FISH) assays
- Catfish, a railfan nickname for Norfolk Southern Railway wide cab locomotives
- Columbus Catfish, a baseball team in the South Atlantic League
- USS Catfish (SS-339), a submarine
- Catfish, the No Place counterpart of Big the Cat from Sonic Prime

== See also ==
- Catfishing, a slang term used for trying to elicit personal information from people on social media
- Mudcat (disambiguation)
