= Seringia undulata =

Scientific classification
- Kingdom: Plantae
- Clade: Tracheophytes
- Clade: Angiosperms
- Clade: Eudicots
- Clade: Rosids
- Order: Malvales
- Family: Malvaceae
- Genus: Seringia
- Species: S. undulata

Binomial name
- Seringia undulata C.F.Wilkins

Synonyms
- Keraudrenia cacaobrunnea subsp. undulata C.F.Wilkins MS

Species of flowering plant

Seringia undulata, commonly known as wavy-leaf fire-bush, is a species of flowering plant in the mallow family and is endemic to a small area of inland Western Australia. It is a suckering, upright shrub with hairy, rust-coloured young stems, oblong, wavy leaves and purple flowers arranged in groups of 6 to 8.

== Description ==
Seringia undulata is a suckering, upright shrub that typically grows to a height of 0.4–1.5 m (1 ft 4 in – 4 ft 11 in), about 0.5–2 m (1 ft 8 in – 6 ft 7 in) wide, and has rust-coloured, hairy stems. The leaves are oblong, 2–7 mm (0.079–0.276 in) long and 2–3 mm (0.079–0.118 in) wide on a petiole up to 3 mm (0.12 in) long with tiny stipules at the base. The edges of the leaves are curved downwards and wavy, the upper surface more or less glabrous and the lower surface densely covered with rust-coloured and white, star-shaped hairs. The flowers are arranged in a cyme about 30 mm (1.2 in) long with 6 to 8 flowers on a peduncle 4–7 mm (0.16–0.28 in) long, each flower on a pedicel 5–10 mm (0.20–0.39 in) long. The flowers are 20 mm (0.79 in) wide and purple with petal-like sepals joined at the base to form a tube with lobes two-thirds the length of the tube. Petals are absent and the stamens have yellow filaments, and dark coloured anthers. Flowering occurs from May to October.

== Taxonomy ==
Seringia undulata was first formally described by Carolyn F. Wilkins in the journal Australian Systematic Botany from specimens collected in the Bremer Range in 2003. The specific epithet (undulata) refers to the leaf margins.

== Distribution and habitat ==
This species of seringia is only known from the Bremer Range area where it grows on roadsides or in sandy or loamy soils over ironstone in the Coolgardie bioregion of inland Western Australia.

== Conservation status ==
Seringia undulata is listed as "Priority One" by the Western Australian Government Department of Biodiversity, Conservation and Attractions, meaning that it is known from only one or a few locations which are potentially at risk.
