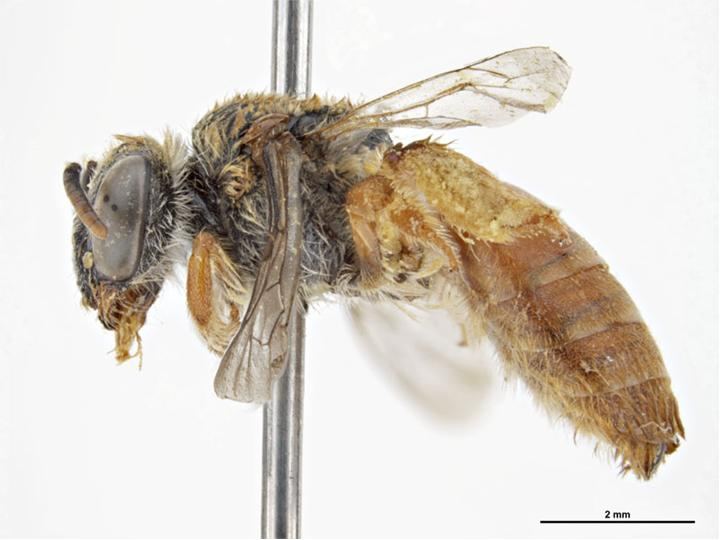
- Female

Scientific classification
- Kingdom: Animalia
- Phylum: Arthropoda
- Clade: Pancrustacea
- Class: Insecta
- Order: Hymenoptera
- Family: Colletidae
- Genus: Leioproctus
- Species: L. pachyodontus

Binomial name
- Leioproctus pachyodontus (Cockerell, 1915)

Synonyms
- Paracolletes pachyodontus Cockerell, 1915

= Leioproctus pachyodontus =

Species of bee

Leioproctus pachyodontus, or Leioproctus (Odontocolletes) pachyodontus, is a species of bee in the family Colletidae and subfamily Colletinae. It is endemic to Australia. It was described by British-American entomologist Theodore Dru Alison Cockerell in 1915.

== Description ==
Male body length is 8–9 mm. Colouration is mainly black and red, with white to brownish hair.

== Distribution and habitat ==
The species occurs in Western Australia. The type locality is Yallingup. It has also been recorded from north of Geraldton and the Hamersley Range.

== Behaviour ==
The adults are flying mellivores. Flowering plants visited by the bees include Baeckea, Seringia and Ptilotus species.

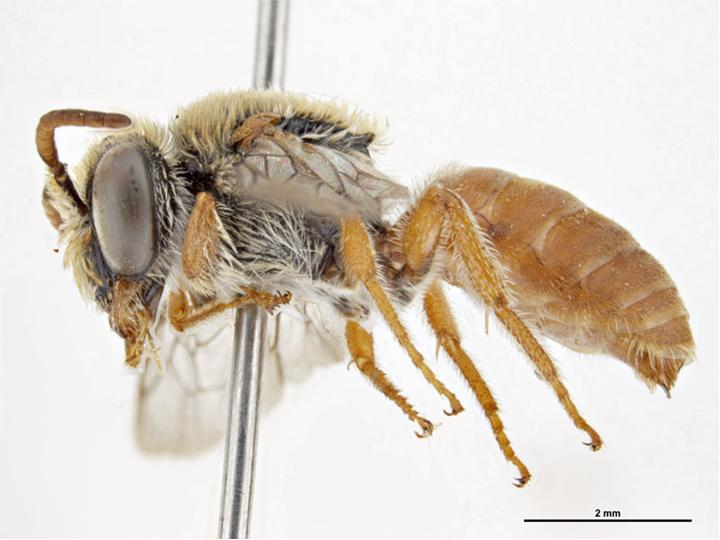
Male
