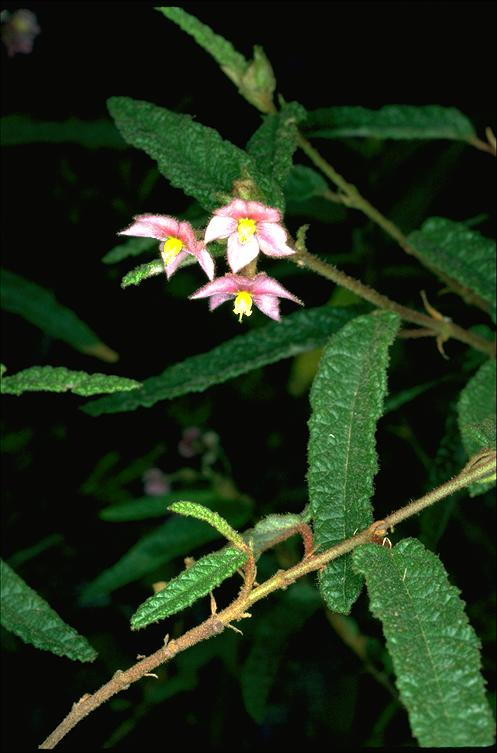
- In the Australian National Botanic Gardens

Scientific classification
- Kingdom: Plantae
- Clade: Tracheophytes
- Clade: Angiosperms
- Clade: Eudicots
- Clade: Rosids
- Order: Malvales
- Family: Malvaceae
- Genus: Seringia
- Species: S. hookeriana

Binomial name
- Seringia hookeriana (Walp.) F.Muell..

Synonyms
- Keraudrenia corollata var. acuminata Domin; Keraudrenia hookeri F.Muell. nom. illeg., nom. superfl.; Keraudrenia hookeriana Walp.; Keraudrenia integrifolia Hook. nom. illeg.; Keraudrenia sp. (Hannaford S.L. Everist 1769); Seringia hookeri F.Muell. orth. var.; Seringia corollata auct. non Steetz

= Seringia hookeriana =

Species of shrub

Seringia hookeriana is a species of flowering plant in the mallow family and is endemic to Queensland. It is a compact suckering shrub with rusty-hairy new growth, oblong leaves and deep purple flowers arranged in groups of 2 to 4.

== Description ==
Seringia hookeriana is a compact, suckering shrub that typically grows to a height of 0.5–2 m (1 ft 8 in – 6 ft 7 in) and 0.5–1 m (1 ft 8 in – 3 ft 3 in) wide, its new growth densely covered with rust-coloured hairs. The leaves are oblong to lance-shaped, 15–65 mm (0.59–2.56 in) long and 5–18 mm (0.20–0.71 in) wide on a petiole 2–8 mm (0.079–0.315 in) long with narrow stipules up to 6 mm (0.24 in) long at the base. The flowers are arranged in groups of 2 to 4 flowers on a linear peduncle 4–8 mm (0.16–0.31 in) long, each flower on 10–15 mm (0.39–0.59 in) in diameter on a pedicel 3–9 mm (0.12–0.35 in) long. The flowers are deep purple, with broadly-lobed sepals tapering to a sharp point. The petals are absent or tiny, and the anthers are held on yellow filaments alternating with the staminodes. Flowering occurs in most months, and the fruit is a bristly capsule up to 20 mm (0.79 in) in diameter.

== Taxonomy ==
This species was first formally described in 1851 by Wilhelm Gerhard Walpers who gave it the name Keraudrenia hookeriana in his Annales Botanices Systematicae. In 1860, Ferdinand von Mueller transferred the species to Seringia as S. hookeriana in his Fragmenta phytographiae Australiae. The specific epithet (hookeriana) honours Joseph Dalton Hooker.

== Distribution and habitat ==
This species grows as an understorey shrub in rocky hills and ranges in central Queensland, from near Ingham to Gungal in New South Wales.

== Conservation status ==
Seringia hookeriana is listed as of "least concern" in Queensland by the Queensland Government Department of Environment and Science.
