= Leaf sucker =

Leaf sucker can mean:

- a leaf blower in suction mode
- a street sweeper machine with suction ability, as translation of German Laubsauger
- an insect that sucks sap from leaves, see aphid or hemiptera

== See also ==
- Leaf (disambiguation)
- Sucker (disambiguation)
