= Leioproctus sicatus =

Scientific classification
- Kingdom: Animalia
- Phylum: Arthropoda
- Clade: Pancrustacea
- Class: Insecta
- Order: Hymenoptera
- Family: Colletidae
- Genus: Leioproctus
- Species: L. sicatus

Binomial name
- Leioproctus sicatus Batley, 2025

Species of bee

Leioproctus sicatus, or Leioproctus (Exleycolletes) sicatus, is a species of bee in the family Colletidae and subfamily Colletinae. It is endemic to Australia. It was described by entomologist Michael Batley in 2025.

== Etymology ==
The specific epithet sicatus (Latin: "dagger") is an anatomical reference to the long apical tooth of the mandible.

== Description ==
The holotype male body length is 9.7 mm, head width 3.0 mm; a female paratype body length 11.5 mm, head width 3.5 mm. Integumental colouration is mainly black, with brown markings. The hair is white to brown.

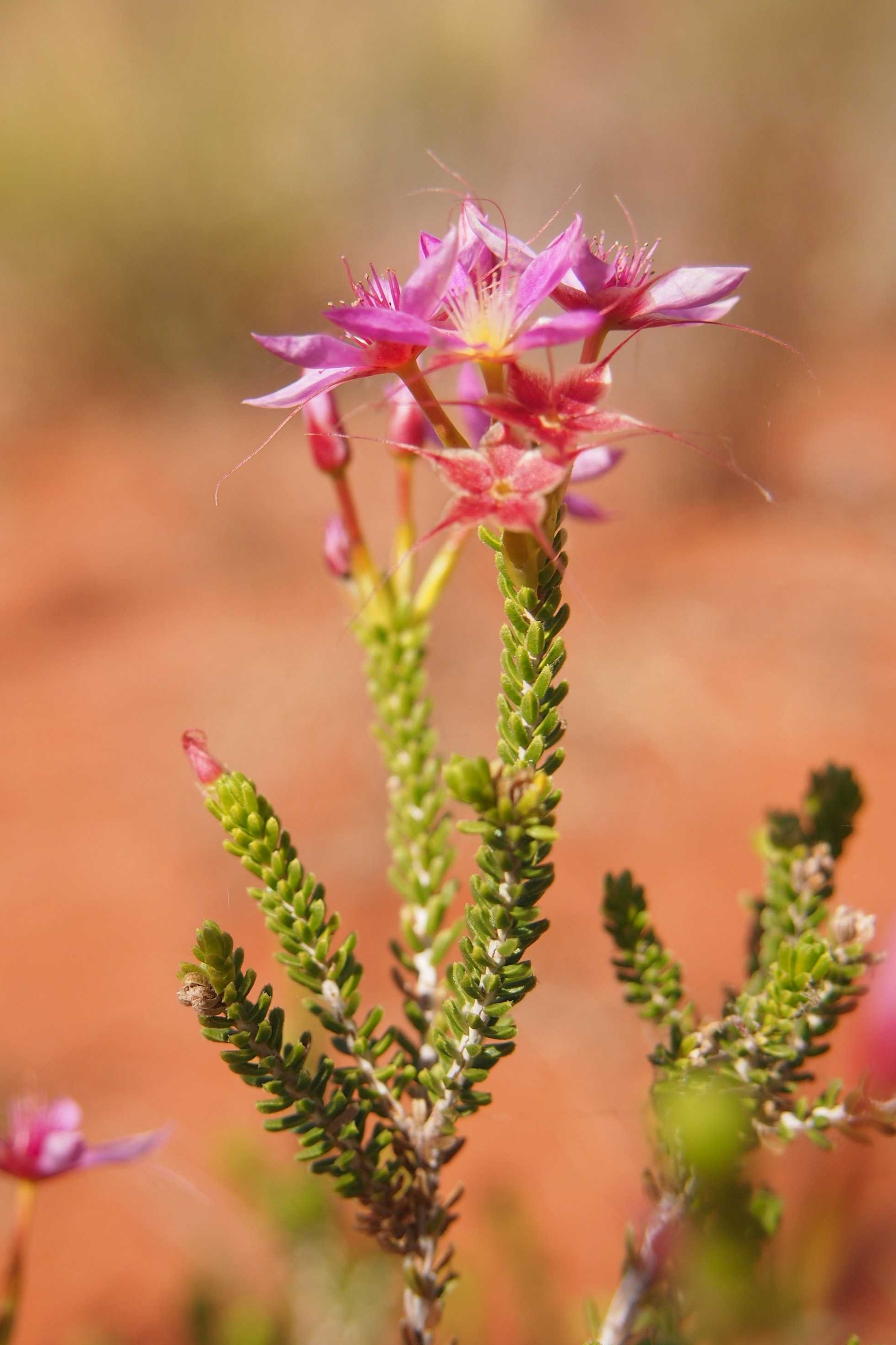
Calytrix longiflora (pink fringe myrtle), a forage plant of the bees

== Distribution and habitat ==
The species occurs in central Australia. The type locality is the Ledknapper Nature Reserve, near Enngonia in north-western New South Wales.

== Behaviour ==
The adults are flying mellivores. Flowering plants visited by the bees include Seringia nephrosperma and Calytrix longiflora.

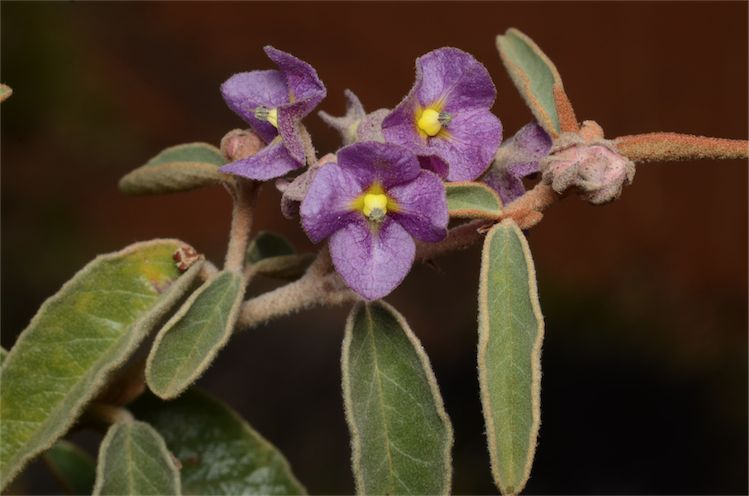
Seringia nephrosperma (free-carpel fire-bush), a forage plant of the bees
