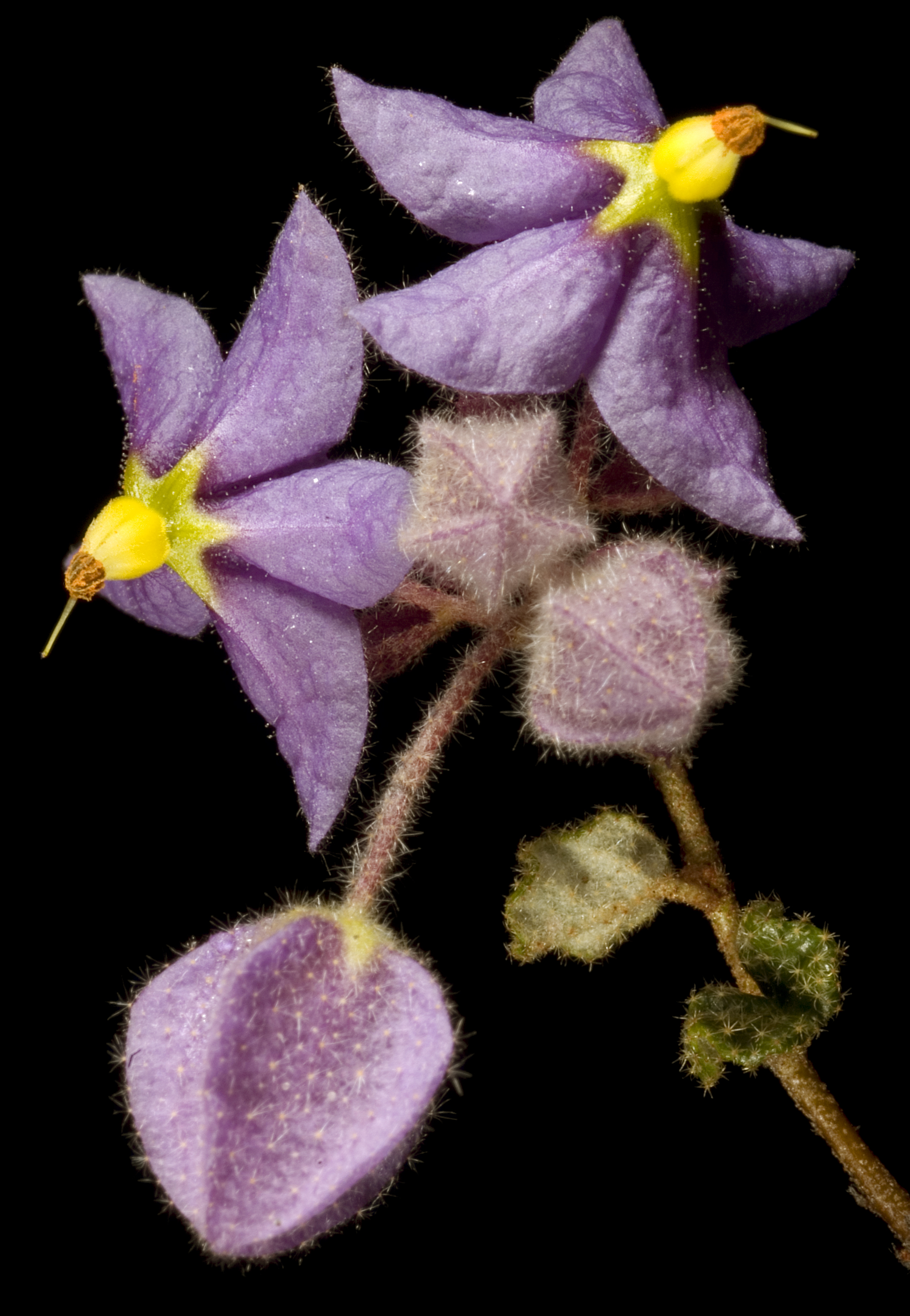

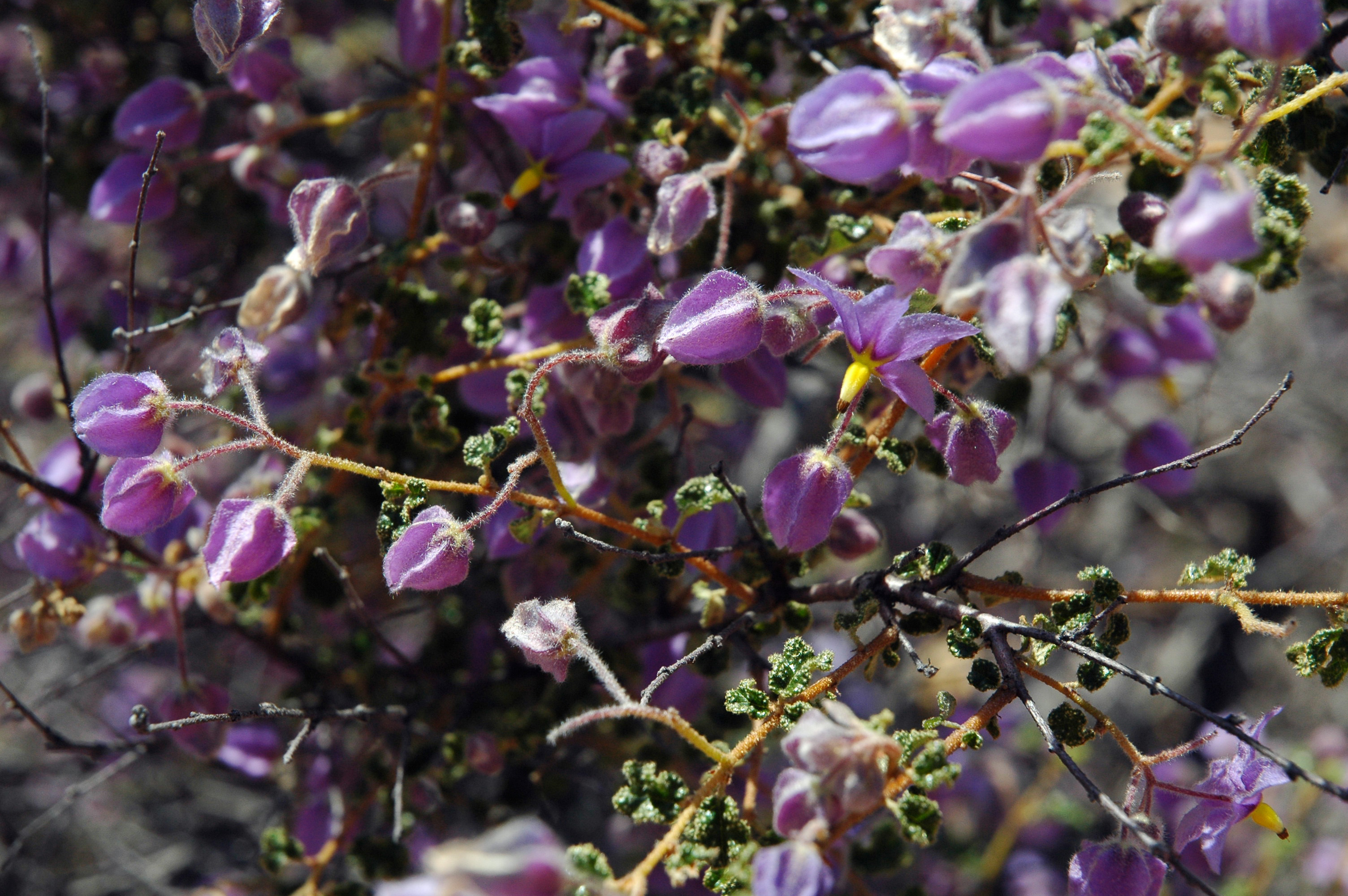

Scientific classification
- Kingdom: Plantae
- Clade: Tracheophytes
- Clade: Angiosperms
- Clade: Eudicots
- Clade: Rosids
- Order: Malvales
- Family: Malvaceae
- Genus: Seringia
- Species: S. hermanniifolia

Binomial name
- Seringia hermanniifolia (J.Gay) F.Muell.

Synonyms
- Keraudrenia hermanniaefolia J.Gay orth. var.; Keraudrenia hermanniifolia J.Gay; Keraudrenia microphylla Steetz; Seringea microphylla F.Muell. orth. var.; Seringia hermannifolia F.Muell. orth. var.; Seringia microphylla (Steetz) F.Muell.; ? Keraudrenia integrifolia auct. non Steud.; Keraudrenia microphylla auct. non Steetz

= Seringia hermanniifolia =

Species of shrub

Seringia hermanniifolia, commonly known as crinkle-leaved firebush, is a species of flowering plant in the mallow family and is endemic to the south-west of Western Australia. It is a low-growing or prostrate, suckering shrub with hairy new growth, hairy, wavy, oblong to egg-shaped leaves and mauve to bluish flowers arranged in groups of 3 to 8.

== Description ==
Seringia hermanniifolia is a low-growing or prostrate, suckering shrub that typically grows to a height of 0.3–1.3 m (1 ft 0 in – 4 ft 3 in) and 0.5–2.0 m (1 ft 8 in – 6 ft 7 in) wide, and has densely hairy new growth. The leaves are oblong to egg-shaped with wavy edges, 2.5–10 mm (0.098–0.394 in) long and wide on a petiole 1–3 mm (0.039–0.118 in) long with narrow stipules 1–2 mm (0.039–0.079 in) long at the base. The flowers are arranged in a cyme up to 15 mm (0.59 in) long with 3 to 8 flowers on a peduncle 10–15 mm (0.39–0.59 in) long, each flower on a pedicel 8–12 mm (0.31–0.47 in) long. The flowers are mauve to bluish with petal-like sepals 6–10 mm (0.24–0.39 in) and joined at the base to form a tube with lobes less than half the length of the tube. There are no petals, the staminodes tiny or absent, and the filaments are bright yellow. Flowering occurs in most months and the fruit is spherical and 14 mm (0.55 in) in diameter.

== Taxonomy ==
This species was first described in 1821 by Jaques Étienne Gay who gave it the name Keraudrenia hermanniifolia in Memoires du Museum d'Histoire Naturelle from specimens collected near Shark Bay. In 1860, Ferdinand von Mueller transferred the species to Seringia as S. hermanniifolia in his Fragmenta phytographie Australiae. The specific epithet (hermanniifolia) means "Hermannia-leaved".

== Distribution and habitat ==
Crinkle-leaved fire bush grows in sandy or gravelly soils in heath and is found from Dirk Hartog Island and Peron Peninsula in the north, to as far south as Badgingarra and Mogumber, in the Avon Wheatbelt, Carnarvon, Geraldton Sandplains, Jarrah Forest, Murchison, Swan Coastal Plain and Yalgoo bioregions of south-western Western Australia.

== Conservation status ==
Seringia hermanniifolia is listed as "not threatened" by the Western Australian Government Department of Biodiversity, Conservation and Attractions.
