= Succa =

Succa may refer to:

- Sukkah, the booths erected for Sukkot, the annual Jewish commemoration of the Exodus from Egypt
- Succa people, an early indigenous people of the Carolinas
- Succa, an eye dialect spelling of sucker
