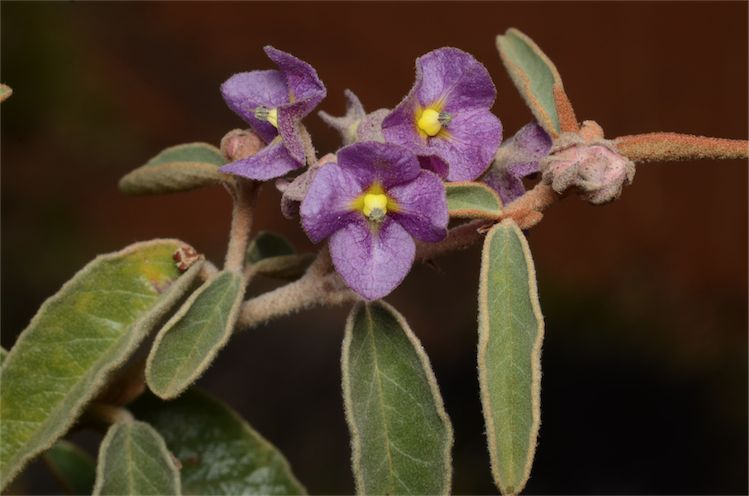
- In Welford National Park

Scientific classification
- Kingdom: Plantae
- Clade: Tracheophytes
- Clade: Angiosperms
- Clade: Eudicots
- Clade: Rosids
- Order: Malvales
- Family: Malvaceae
- Genus: Seringia
- Species: S. nephrosperma

Binomial name
- Seringia nephrosperma F.Muell.

Synonyms
- List: Keraudrenia collina var. multiflora Domin; Keraudrenia nephrosperma (F.Muell.) Benth. isonym; Keraudrenia nephrosperma (F.Muell.) F.Muell.; Keraudrenia sp. A; Keraudrenia sp. A Kimb. Flora; Keraudrenia sp. A Kimberley Flora (T.E.H.Aplin et al. 333) WA Herbarium; Seringea nephrosperma F.Muell. orth. var.; Keraudrenia integrifolia auct. non Steud.; ? Keraudrenia integrifolia auct. non Steud.: Guymer, G.P.

= Seringia nephrosperma =

Species of shrub

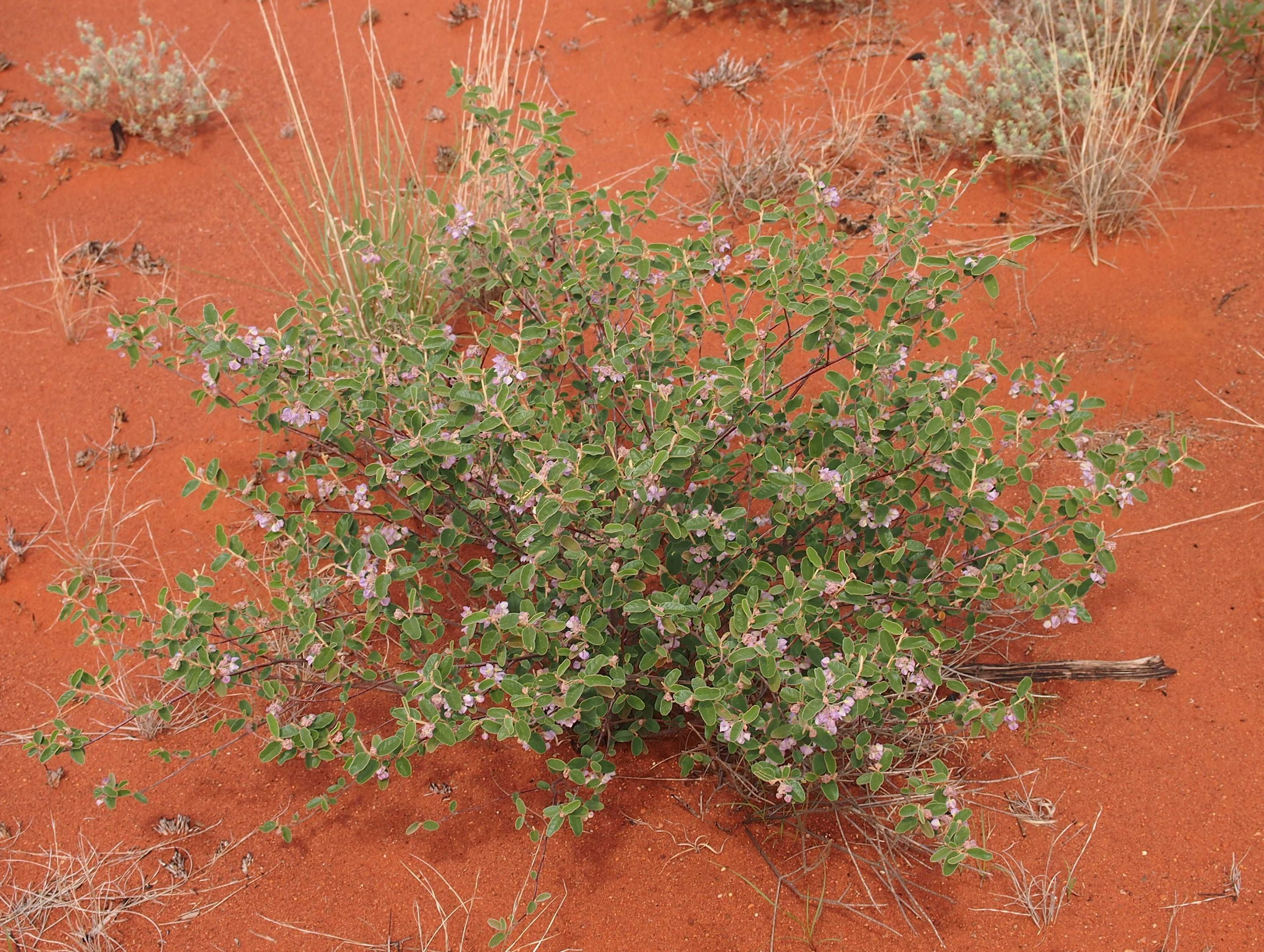
Habit

Seringia nephrosperma, commonly known as free-carpel fire-bush, is a species of flowering plant in the mallow family and is endemic to northern Australia. It is an upright, suckering shrub with hairy new growth, usually oblong to lance-shaped leaves, and purple flowers arranged in groups of 5 to 25.

== Description ==
Seringia nephrosperma is an upright, suckering shrub that typically grows to a height of 1.5 m (4 ft 11 in) and 1.0 m (3 ft 3 in) wide, its new growth covered with white, star-shaped hairs. The leaves are usually oblong to lance-shaped, greyish-green, 10–30 mm (0.39–1.18 in) long and 5–15 mm (0.20–0.59 in) wide on a twisted petiole 3–5 mm (0.12–0.20 in) long with tiny stipules at the base. The flowers are arranged in a cyme with 5 to 25 flowers on a peduncle 3–8 mm (0.12–0.31 in) long, each flower on a pedicel 3–10 mm (0.12–0.39 in) long. The flowers are purple with petal-like sepals opening to 20–30 mm (0.79–1.18 in) wide, covered on the back with white, star-shaped hairs. There are no petals, up to 5 staminodes, and the filaments are yellow. Flowering occurs in most months and the fruit is 3–4 mm (0.12–0.16 in) long and 2.5–3.5 mm (0.098–0.138 in) wide. This species is similar to S. exastia.

== Taxonomy ==
This species was first described in 1863 by Ferdinand von Mueller who gave it the name Keraudrenia nephrosperma in Hooker's Journal of Botany and Kew Garden Miscellany. In 1860, von Mueller transferred the species to Seringia as S. nephrosperma. The specific epithet (nephrosperma) means "kidney-shaped", referring to the shape of the seeds.

== Distribution and habitat ==
Free-carpel fire-bush usually grows in drier inland areas of New South Wales, the Northern Territory, Queensland, South Australia, and northern Western Australia.
