= Leioproctus arenastrus =

Scientific classification
- Kingdom: Animalia
- Phylum: Arthropoda
- Clade: Pancrustacea
- Class: Insecta
- Order: Hymenoptera
- Family: Colletidae
- Genus: Leioproctus
- Species: L. arenastrus

Binomial name
- Leioproctus arenastrus Batley, 2025

Species of bee

Leioproctus arenastrus, or Leioproctus (Euryglossidia) arenastrus, is a species of bee in the family Colletidae and subfamily Colletinae. It is endemic to Australia. It was described by entomologist Michael Batley in 2025.

== Etymology ==
The specific epithet arenastrus indicates that the species resembles Leioproctus arenarius.

== Description ==
Male body length is 5.5 mm, female body length 6.5 mm. Integumental colouration is mainly black. The hair is white and pale brown.

== Distribution and habitat ==
The species occurs in inland southern Western Australia. The type locality is Credo Station in the Goldfields–Esperance region.

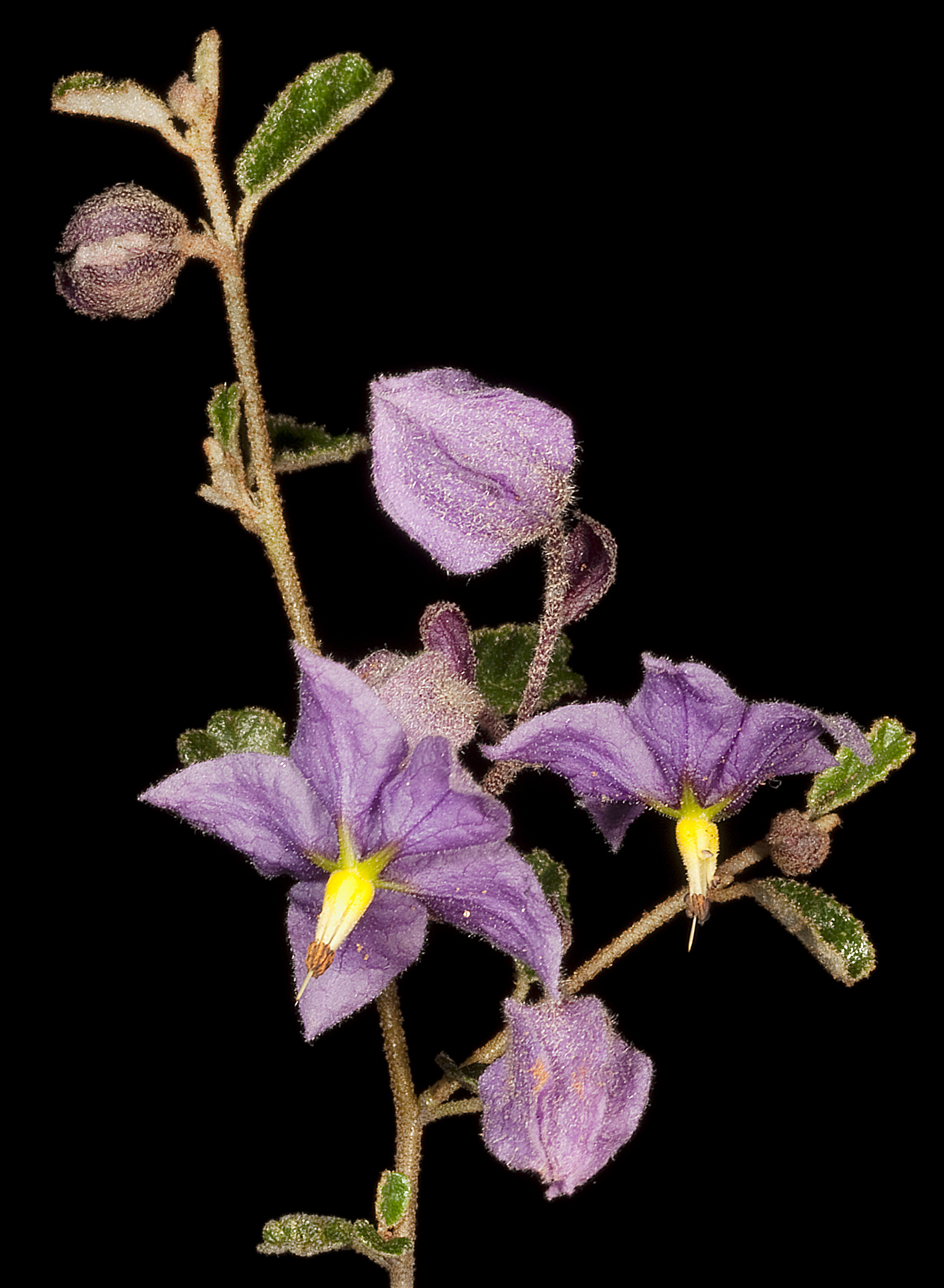
Flowers of Seringia integrifolia

== Behaviour ==
The adults are flying mellivores. Flowering plants visited by the bees include Seringia integrifolia, as well as Acacia species.

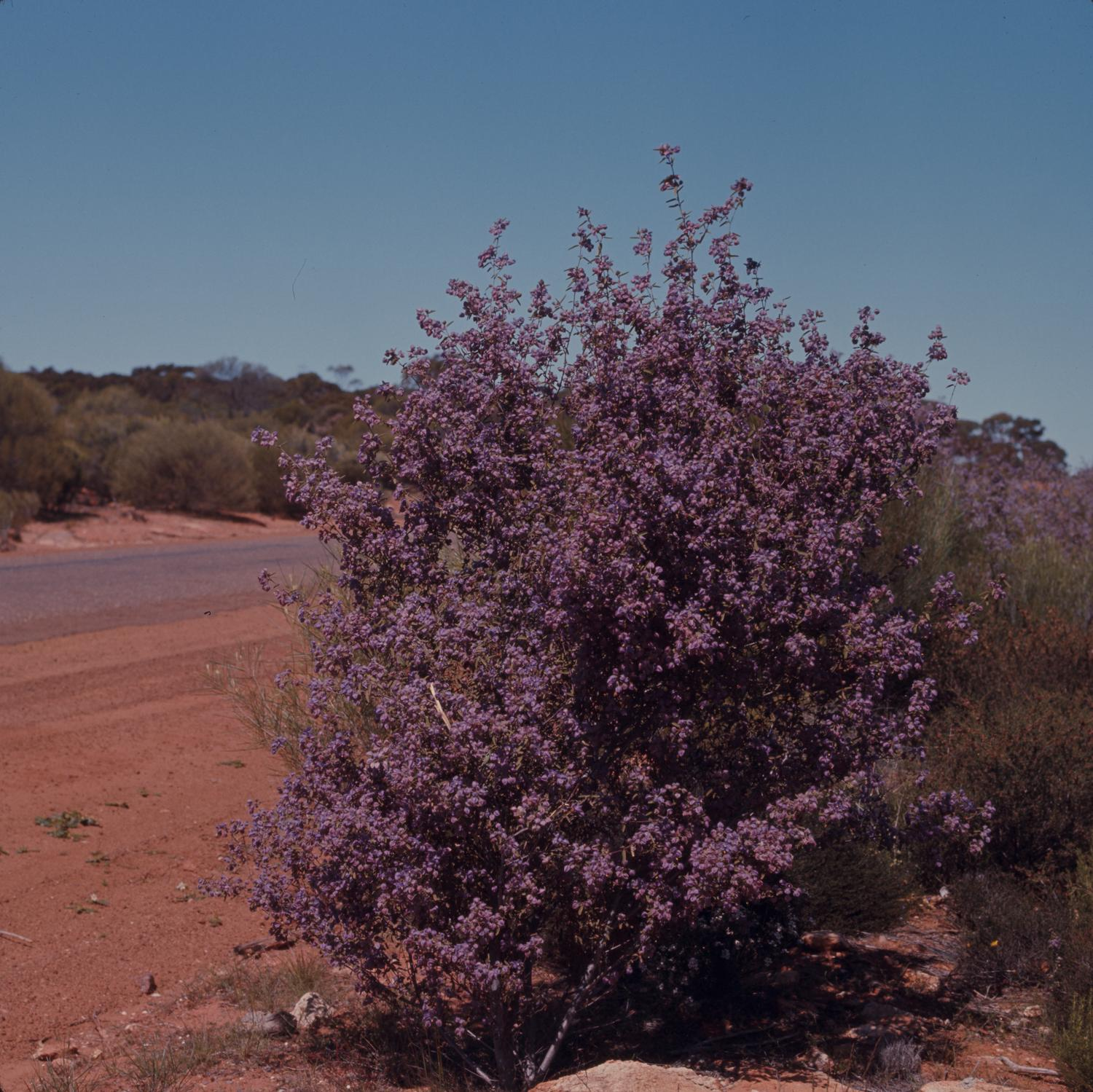
Seringia integrifolia (common firebush), a forage plant of the bees
