= Sucker catfish =

Sucker catfish may refer to:

- Members of Loricariidae, a family of catfishes with a suckermouth
- Members of Sisoridae, a family of catfishes that may have an adhesive apparatus on their thorax or on paired fins

== See also ==
- Suckerfish (disambiguation)
- Catfish (disambiguation)
