= Seringia × katatona =

Scientific classification
- Kingdom: Plantae
- Clade: Tracheophytes
- Clade: Angiosperms
- Clade: Eudicots
- Clade: Rosids
- Order: Malvales
- Family: Malvaceae
- Genus: Seringia
- Species: S. × katatona

Binomial name
- Seringia × katatona (C.F.Wilkins) C.F.Wilkins & Whitlock

Synonyms
- Keraudrenia exastia C.F.Wilkins

Species of flowering plant

Seringia × katatona, commonly known as red dune fire-bush, is a species of flowering plant in the mallow family and is endemic to northern Western Australia. It is an erect, compact, suckering shrub, with hairy young branches, egg-shaped to elliptic leaves and purple flowers arranged in groups of 9 to 17.

== Description ==
Seringia × katatona is an erect, compact shrub with many stems, and that typically grows up to 0.5–1.0 m (1 ft 8 in – 3 ft 3 in) high, 1 m (3 ft 3 in) wide, and sometimes forms suckers. The leaves are arranged alternately, at first trilobed or egg-shaped, about 35 mm (1.4 in) long and 18 mm (0.71 in) wide, later oblong, 12–28 mm (0.47–1.10 in) long and 6–10 mm (0.24–0.39 in) wide on a petiole 2.5–6 mm (0.098–0.236 in) long with narrowly egg-shaped stipules 2.0–4.5 mm (0.079–0.177 in) long at the base. The flowers are arranged in a cyme 9–17 mm (0.35–0.67 in) long with 9 to 17 flowers on a peduncle 3–7 mm (0.12–0.28 in) long, each flower on a pedicel 7–11 mm (0.28–0.43 in) long. The flowers are purple with petal-like, broadly egg-shaped sepals 7–9 mm (0.28–0.35 in) and joined at the base to form a tube with lobes half the length of the tube. Petals are absent, the staminodes tiny, and the filaments and anthers are yellow. Flowering occurs from March to August.

== Taxonomy ==
In 1999, Carolyn F. Wilkins described Keraudrenia katatona in the journal Nuytsia from specimens collected near the Broome airport in 1995. In 2016, Wilkins and Barbara Ann Whitlock changed the name to Seringia × katatona in Australian Systematic Botany. The specific epithet (katatona) means "broader than high", referring to the sepals.

== Distribution and habitat ==
Red dune fire-bush grows in red sand on desert dunes and is restricted to near Broome and near Port Hedland in the Dampierland and Great Sandy Desert bioregions of northern Western Australia.

== Conservation status ==
Seringia × katatona is listed as "not threatened" by the Western Australian Government Department of Biodiversity, Conservation and Attractions.
