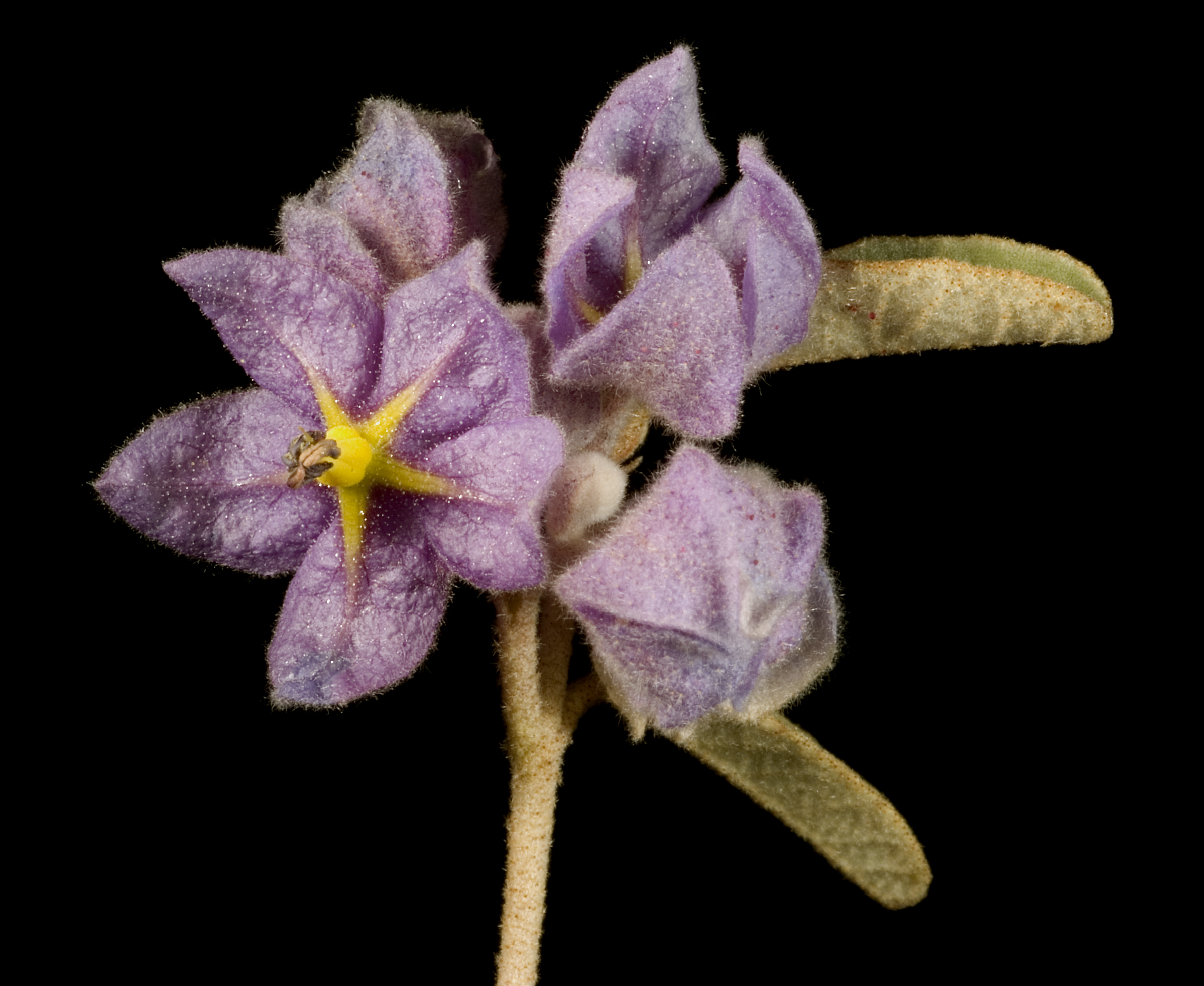

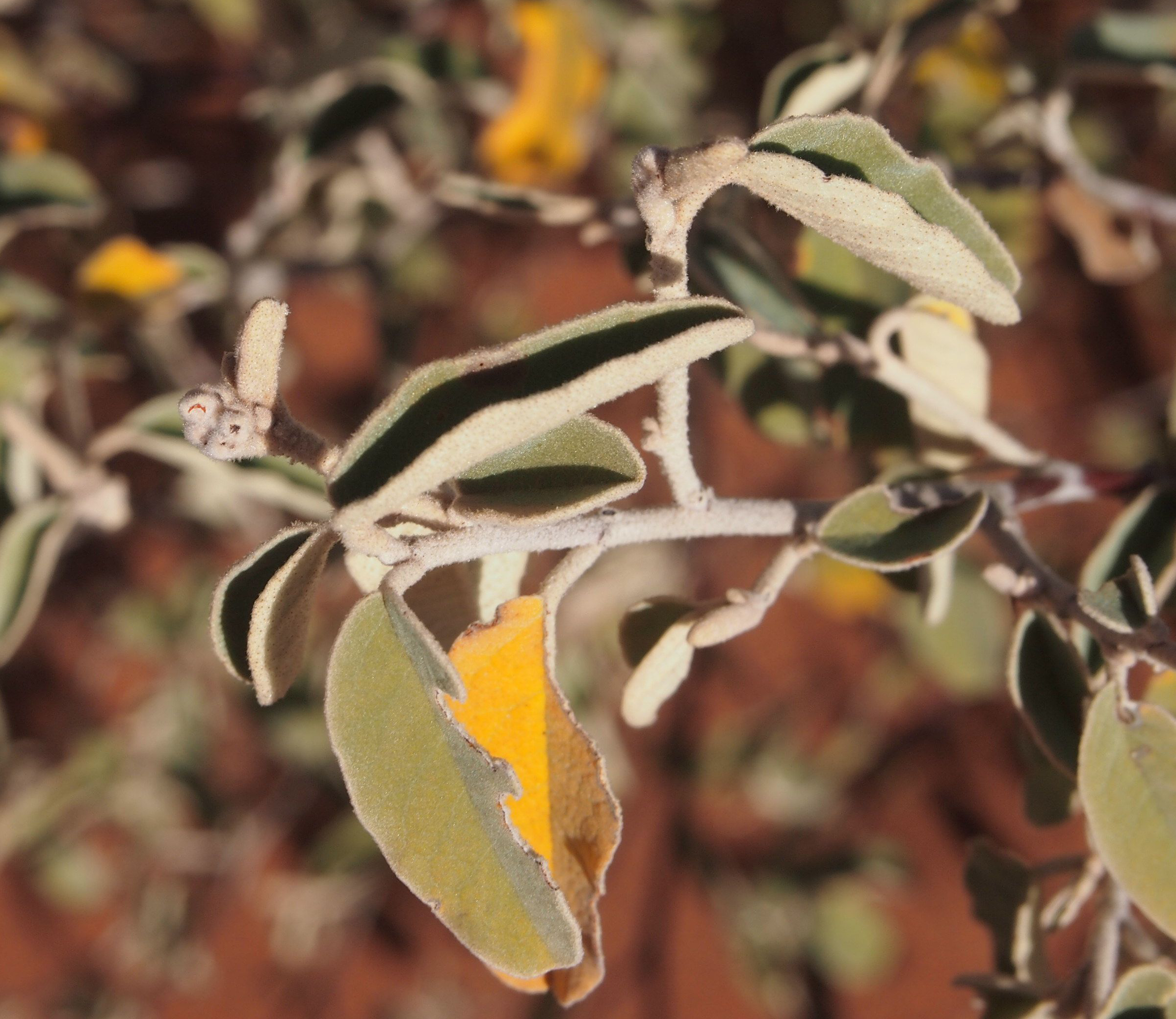

Scientific classification
- Kingdom: Plantae
- Clade: Tracheophytes
- Clade: Angiosperms
- Clade: Eudicots
- Clade: Rosids
- Order: Malvales
- Family: Malvaceae
- Genus: Seringia
- Species: S. velutina

Binomial name
- Seringia velutina (Steetz) F.Muell.

Synonyms
- Keraudrenia integrifolia var. velutina (Steetz) Benth.; Keraudrenia velutina Steetz; Seringea grandiflora F.Muell. orth. var.; Seringia grandiflora F.Muell.; Keraudrenia integrifolia auct. non Steud.: Grieve, B.J. (1998)

= Seringia velutina =

Species of shrub

Seringia velutina, commonly known as velvet firebush, is a species of flowering plant in the family Malvaceae family and is endemic to the south-west of Western Australia. It is a suckering shrub that sometimes forms dense colonies. Its leaves are narrowly elliptic to egg-shaped and it has 3 to 11 pale pink to purple flowers arranged in loose cymes.

== Description ==
Seringia velutina is a suckering shrub that typically grows to a height of 1–3 m (3 ft 3 in – 9 ft 10 in), about 0.5–1 m (1 ft 8 in – 3 ft 3 in) wide, and that sometimes forms dense colonies. Its young branches are covered in thick cream- or rust-coloured, star-shaped hairs. The leaves are narrowly oblong to egg-shaped, 5–35 mm (0.20–1.38 in) long and 3–8 mm (0.12–0.31 in) wide on a petiole 1–5 mm (0.039–0.197 in) long with stipules 1–4 mm (0.039–0.157 in) long at the base. The upper surface of the leaves is covered with pale, star-shaped and the lower surface is also sometimes covered with glandular hairs. The flowers are arranged in a cyme with 3 to 11 flowers on a peduncle 2–8 mm (0.079–0.315 in) long, each flower on a pedicel 4–12 mm (0.16–0.47 in) long. The flowers are 25 mm (0.98 in) wide and pale pink to purple petal-like sepals joined at the base and deeply lobed. Petals are absent and the stamens have yellow filaments, alternating with tiny staminodes. Flowering occurs in most months.

== Taxonomy ==
This species was first described in 1846 by Joachim Steetz who gave it the name Keraudrenia velutina in Leeman's Plantae Preissianae but was moved to the genus Seringia as S. velutina by Ferdinand von Mueller in 1860.

== Distribution and habitat ==
Seringia velutina is widespread and common between Kalbarri, Ravensthorpe and inland to the Great Victoria Desert on rocky outcrops, plains and along roadsides in the Avon Wheatbelt, Coolgardie, Esperance Plains, Geraldton Sandplains, Great Victoria Desert, Jarrah Forest, Mallee, Murchison and Yalgoo bioregions of Western Australia.
