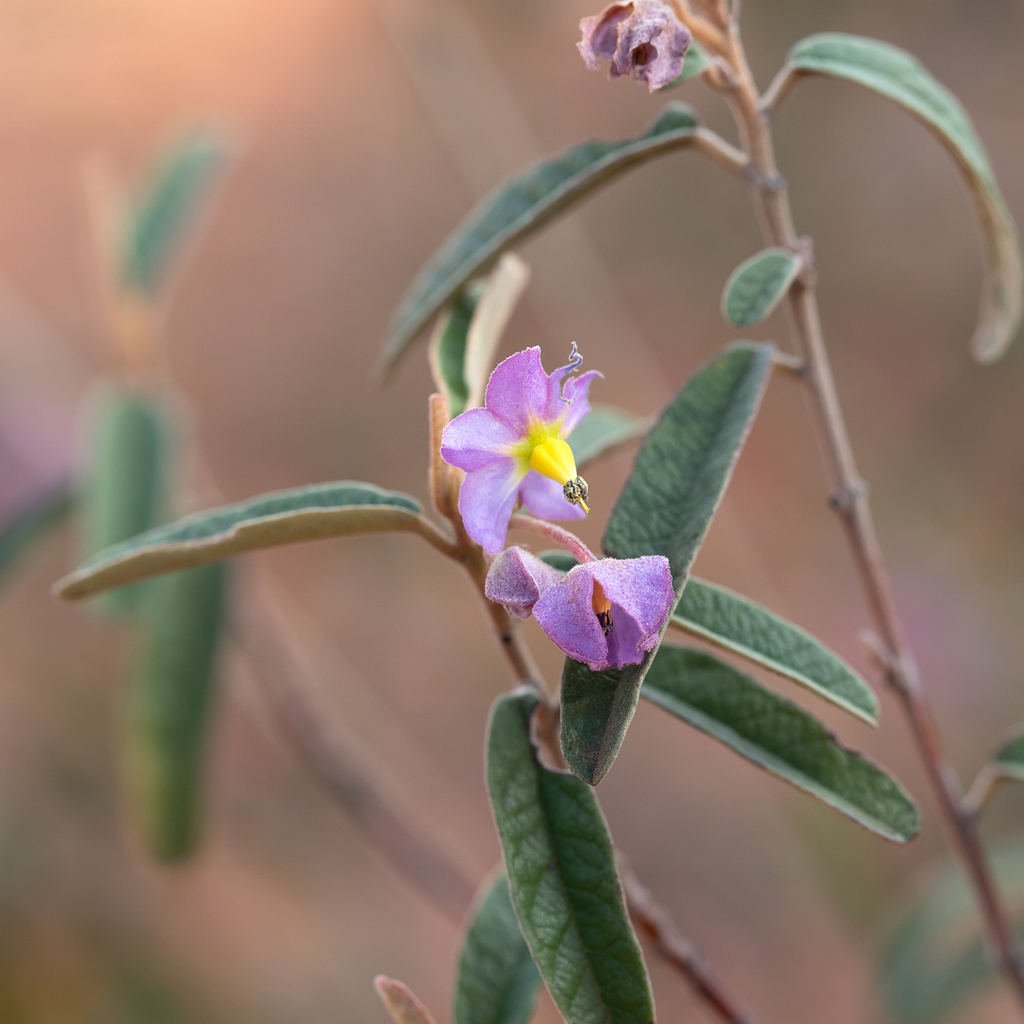
- Near Charleville

Scientific classification
- Kingdom: Plantae
- Clade: Tracheophytes
- Clade: Angiosperms
- Clade: Eudicots
- Clade: Rosids
- Order: Malvales
- Family: Malvaceae
- Genus: Seringia
- Species: S. collina

Binomial name
- Seringia collina (Domin) C.F.Wilkins & Whitlock

= Seringia collina =

Species of flowering plant

Seringia collina is a species of flowering plant in the family Malvaceae and is endemic to Queensland. It is a low growing, small rounded shrub with hairy branches, oblong to egg-shaped leaves and usually purple flowers in groups of 3 to 6.

== Description ==
Seringia collina is a low growing, small rounded suckering shrub that typically grows up to 0.3–1.5 m (1 ft 0 in – 4 ft 11 in) high and 0.5–2 m (1 ft 8 in – 6 ft 7 in) wide, its branchlets covered with rust-coloured hairs. The leaves are oblong to egg-shaped, 10–50 mm (0.39–1.97 in) long and 4–15 mm (0.16–0.59 in) wide on a petiole 2–4 mm (0.079–0.157 in) long, with narrow stipules up to 5 mm (0.20 in) long at the base. The upper surface of the leaves has a sparse covering of star-shaped hairs and the lower surface is covered with dense, star-shaped hairs and a few glandular hairs. The flowers are purple, rarely white, up to 15 mm (0.59 in) wide, borne in groups of 3 to 6 on a peduncle 3–7 mm (0.12–0.28 in) long, each flower on a pedicel 5–12 mm (0.20–0.47 in) long opposite the leaves. The sepals are wider than long, joined at the base for less than half their length, and there are no petals. The staminodes are tiny, and the filaments are longer than the anthers. Flowering occurs from January to November and the ovary is hairy with segmented carpels.

== Taxonomy ==
This species was first formally described in 1928 by Karel Domin who gave it the name Keraudrenia collina in Bibliotheca Botanica from specimens he collected near Jericho. In 2016, C.F.Wilkins and Whitlock transferred the species to Seringia as S. collina in Australian Systematic Botany. The specific epithet (collina) means "living an hills".

== Distribution and habitat ==
Seringia collina is widespread in Queensland where it grows in sandy clay soils on low hills and plains, and often on roadsides.

== Conservation ==
The species has been listed as "least concern" under the Queensland Government Nature Conservation Act 1992.
