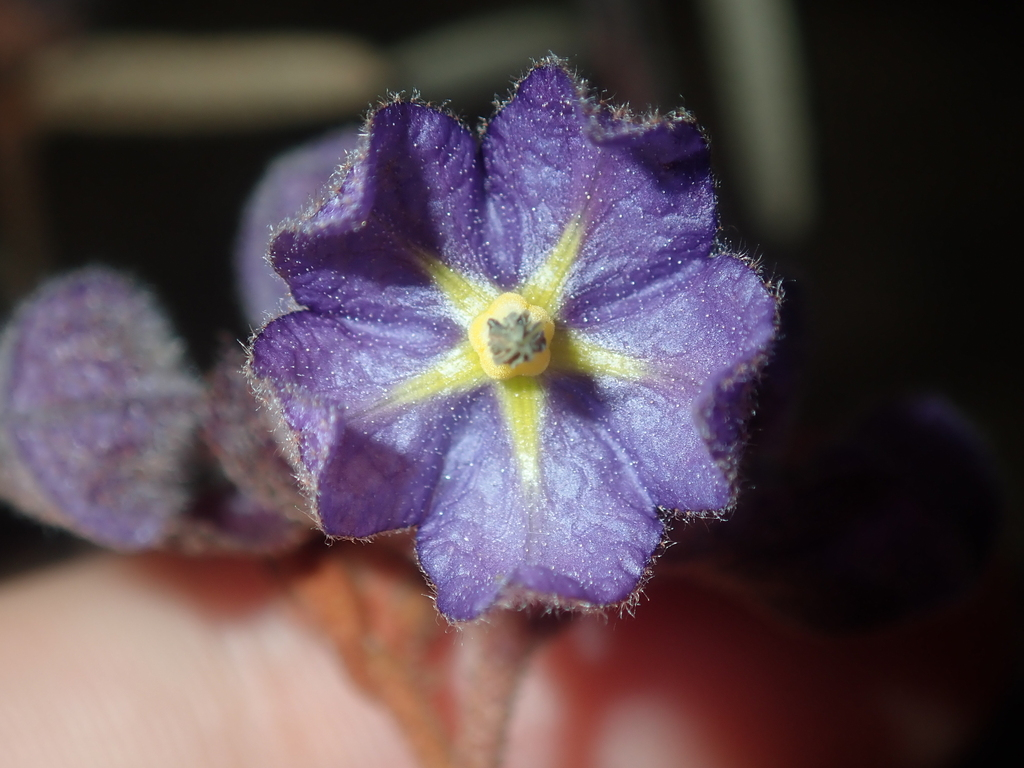

Scientific classification
- Kingdom: Plantae
- Clade: Tracheophytes
- Clade: Angiosperms
- Clade: Eudicots
- Clade: Rosids
- Order: Malvales
- Family: Malvaceae
- Genus: Seringia
- Species: S. cacaobrunnea

Binomial name
- Seringia cacaobrunnea C.F.Wilkins

= Seringia cacaobrunnea =

Species of flowering plant

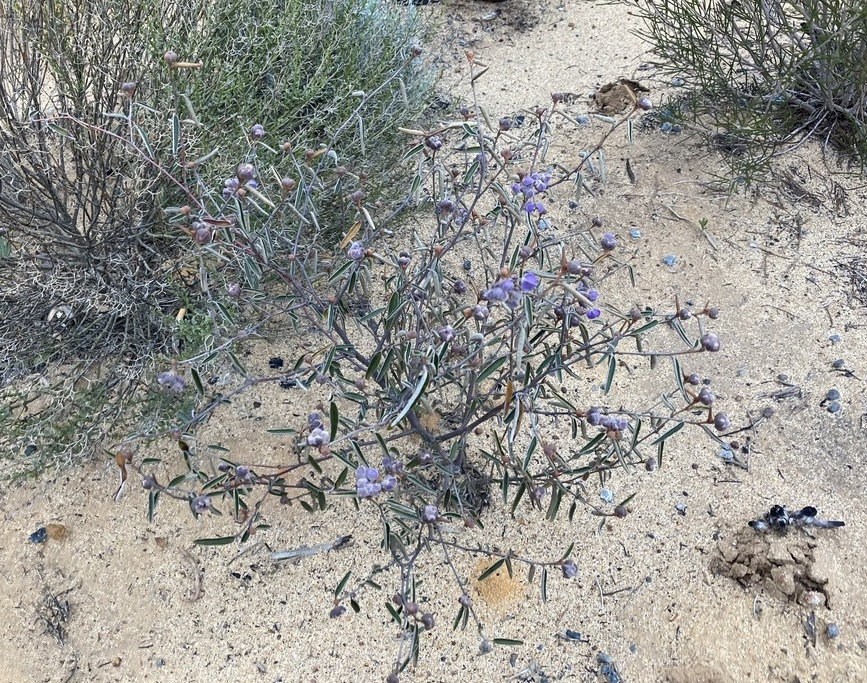
Habit near Coolgardie

Seringia cacaobrunnea, commonly known as chocolate fire-bush, is a species of flowering plant in the family Malvaceae and is endemic to the south-west of Western Australia. It is a bushy shrub with hairy new growth, oblong to elliptic leaves and purple flowers in groups of 3 to 11.

== Description ==
Seringia cacaobrunnea is a bushy, suckering shrub that typically grows up to 0.4–1.0 m (1 ft 4 in – 3 ft 3 in) high and 0.5–1 m (1 ft 8 in – 3 ft 3 in) wide, its young growth covered with dark brown, star-shaped hairs. The leaves are oblong to elliptic, 5–30 mm (0.20–1.18 in) long and 3–8 mm (0.12–0.31 in) wide on a petiole 1–5 mm (0.039–0.197 in) long, with narrow stipules up to 4 mm (0.16 in) long at the base. The upper surface of the leaves is more or less glabrous and the lower surface is covered with rust-coloured, star-shaped hairs. The flowers are purple, 12–15 mm (0.47–0.59 in) wide, borne in groups of 3 to 11 on a peduncle 2–8 mm (0.079–0.315 in) long, each flower on a pedicel 4–12 mm (0.16–0.47 in) long with rust-coloured bracts 4–10 mm (0.16–0.39 in) long at the base. The sepals are purple, 8–11 mm (0.31–0.43 in) and joined at the base for about half their length, and there are no petals. The staminodes are 2 mm (0.079 in) long, and the anthers are slightly shorter than the filaments. Flowering occurs from May to January, with a peak in September.

== Taxonomy ==
Seringia cacaobrunnea was first formally described in 2016 by Carolyn F. Wilkins in Australian Systematic Botany from specimens collected near the Norseman to Esperance Road in 2010. The specific epithet (cacaobrunnea) means "chocolate-brown" and refers to the hairs on the foliage.

== Distribution and habitat ==
Chocolate fire-bush grows in mallee heath and woodland in isolated populations near Ravensthorpe, Lake King, Mukinbudin and east of Salmon Gums in the Avon Wheatbelt, Coolgardie, Esperance Plains and Mallee bioregions of south-western Western Australia.

== Conservation ==
The species has been listed as "not threatened" by the Government of Western Australia Department of Biodiversity, Conservation and Attractions.
