= Seringia adenogyna =

Conservation status
- Priority Three — Poorly Known Taxa (DEC)

Scientific classification
- Kingdom: Plantae
- Clade: Tracheophytes
- Clade: Angiosperms
- Clade: Eudicots
- Clade: Rosids
- Order: Malvales
- Family: Malvaceae
- Genus: Seringia
- Species: S. adenogyna

Binomial name
- Seringia adenogyna C.F.Wilkins

Species of flowering plant

Seringia adenogyna, commonly known as skinny-leaved fire-bush, is a species of flowering plant in the family Malvaceae and is endemic to the south-west of Western Australia. It is an erect shrub with hairy new growth, linear to narrowly oblong leaves and purple flowers usually in groups of 2 to 4.

== Description ==
Seringia adenogyna is an erect shrub that typically grows up to 0.2–0.4 m (7.9 in – 1 ft 3.7 in) high and 1 m (3 ft 3 in) wide, its young growth covered with woolly, star-shaped hairs. The leaves are linear to narrowly oblong, 5–40 mm (0.20–1.57 in) long and 2–4 mm (0.079–0.157 in) wide on a petiole up to 4 mm (0.16 in) long, with narrow stipules 5 mm (0.20 in) long at the base. Both sides of the leaves are covered with star-shaped and glandular hairs, and the edges are rolled under. The flowers are purple, 15–20 mm (0.59–0.79 in) wide, borne in groups of 2 to 4 on a short peduncle each flower on a pedicel 6–13 mm (0.24–0.51 in) long with bracts up to 5 mm (0.20 in) long at the base. The sepals are 8–10 mm (0.31–0.39 in) wide and fused for half their length. There are no petals, the staminodes are yellow, and the anthers are bright red, later purple. Flowering occurs from June to October.

== Taxonomy ==
Seringia adenogyna was first formally described in 2016 by Carolyn F. Wilkins in Australian Systematic Botany from specimens collected near the Norseman to Lake King Road in 2010. The specific epithet (adenogyna) refers to the glands on the immature ovary.

== Distribution and habitat ==
Skinny-leaved fire-bush grows in mallee, shrubland and heath in widely separated areas near Cape Riche, Ongerup, Hyden and Lake King in the Coolgardie, Mallee and Esperance Plains bioregions of south-western Western Australia.

== Conservation ==
The species has been listed as "Priority Three" by the Government of Western Australia Department of Biodiversity, Conservation and Attractions, meaning that it is poorly known and known from only a few locations but is not under imminent threat.
