= Sucker Punch =

A sucker punch is a blow made without warning.

Sucker Punch or suckerpunch may also refer to:

== Books ==
- Sucker Punch (play), a 2010 play by the British playwright Roy Williams

== Film and TV ==
- Sucker Punch (2008 film), a film featuring Gordon Alexander and Antonio Fargas
- Sucker Punch (2011 film), an action-fantasy film featuring Emily Browning
- "Sucker Punch" (Castle), an episode of the TV series Castle
- "Sucker Punch" (Suits), a 2012 television episode

== Music ==
=== Albums ===
- Sucker Punch (Haji's Kitchen album), 2001
- Sucker Punch (soundtrack), soundtrack album for the 2011 film
- Sucker Punch (Sigrid album), 2019
- The Sucker Punch Show, the third full-length album released by indie rock band Lovedrug
- Suckapunch (album), a 2021 album by You Me at Six
- Suckerpunch (Maggie Lindemann album), 2022
- Suckerpunch, 2022 album by Chloe Moriondo

=== Songs ===
- "Sucker Punch" (song), a 2018 single by Sigrid
- "Sucker Punch", a song by MacKenzie Porter from Nobody's Born with a Broken Heart
- "Sucker Punch", a song by OneRepublic from Waking Up
- "Sucker Punch", a song by Savage Republic from Customs
- "Suckerpunch", a song by All Time Low from Everyone's Talking!
- "Suckerpunch", a song by Bowling for Soup from Let's Do It for Johnny!
- "Suckerpunch", a song by Delain from Moonbathers
- "Suckerpunch", a song by Five Iron Frenzy from Our Newest Album Ever!
- "Suckerpunch", a song by the Mayfield Four from Fallout
- "Suckerpunch", a single by the Wildhearts taken from Earth vs the Wildhearts

== Gaming ==
- Sucker Punch Productions, an American video game developer

== See also ==
- Sucker (disambiguation)
- Punch (disambiguation)
