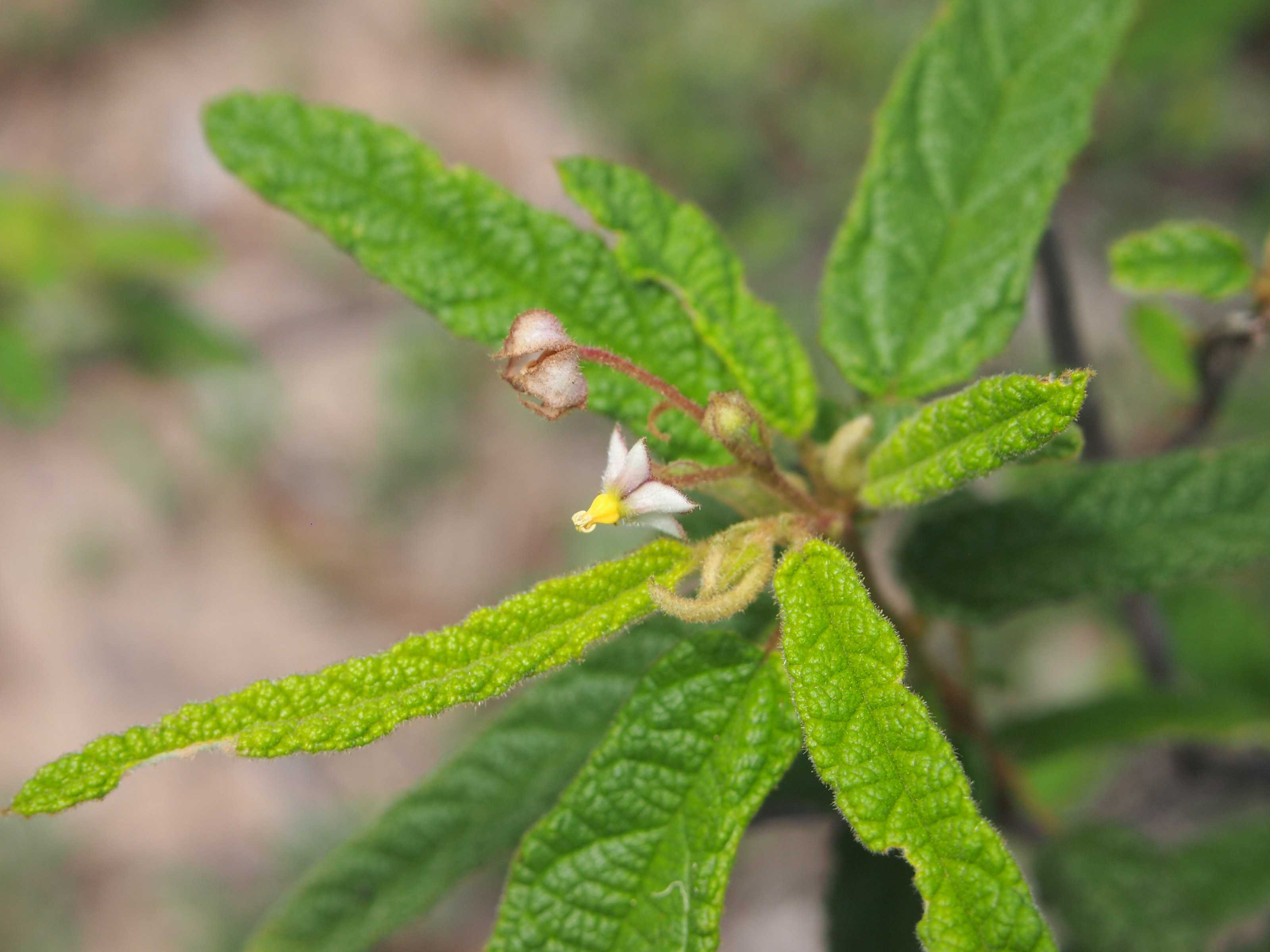

Scientific classification
- Kingdom: Plantae
- Clade: Tracheophytes
- Clade: Angiosperms
- Clade: Eudicots
- Clade: Rosids
- Order: Malvales
- Family: Malvaceae
- Genus: Seringia
- Species: S. corollata

Binomial name
- Seringia corollata Steetz

Synonyms
- Keraudrenia corollata (Steetz) Druce (1917); Keraudrenia corollata var. acuminata Domin (1928)

= Seringia corollata =

Species of shrub

Seringia corollata is a species of flowering plant in the family Malvaceae and is endemic to north-eastern Australia. It is a small, low-growing shrub with hairy young branches, egg-shaped to lance-shaped leaves and mauve flowers arranged singly or in groups of up to 3.

== Description ==
Seringia corollata is a small, low-growing shrub that typically grows up to 0.3–1.5 m (1 ft 0 in – 4 ft 11 in) high and 0.5–1 m (1 ft 8 in – 3 ft 3 in) wide, its branchlets covered with rust-coloured and white hairs when young, later glabrous. The leaves are egg-shaped to lance-shaped, 20–70 mm (0.79–2.76 in) long and 5–20 mm (0.20–0.79 in) wide on a petiole 3–8 mm (0.12–0.31 in) long, with narrowly triangular stipules 2–5 mm (0.079–0.197 in) long at the base. The upper surface of the leaves is deeply wrinkled and the lower surface is densely covered, with soft, white hairs and prominent veins. The flowers are mauve, borne in singly or in groups of up to 3 on a peduncle 3–8 mm (0.12–0.31 in) long, each flower on a pedicel 5–10 mm (0.20–0.39 in) long. The sepals are 10–13 mm (0.39–0.51 in) in diameter, the lobes longer than wide, and there are usually no petals. The staminodes are less than 2 mm (0.079 in) long, and the filaments and anthers are yellow. Flowering occurs in most months and the fruit is spherical, 1.0–1.5 mm (0.039–0.059 in) long and has obvious wings.

== Taxonomy ==
Seringia corollata was first formally described in 1846 by Joachim Steetz in Lehmann's Plantae Preissianae from specimens collected by Ferdinand Bauer. The specific epithet (corollata) refers to the presence of a corolla.

== Distribution and habitat ==
Seringia collina grows in the understorey of woodland and is widespread from Mount Mulligan in Queensland to near Rylstone in New South Wales, and on Groote Eylandt and in eastern Kakadu in the Northern Territory.
