= Suckerfish =

Suckerfish or sucker may refer to:

- the remoras (family Echeneidae): ray-finned fishes that use suction to hold onto larger marine animals
- the family Catostomidae (suckers): freshwater fish found mostly in North America
- the species Hypostomus plecostomus (the suckermouth catfish), or other members of family Loricariidae
- Chinese sucker fish (Beaufortia kweichowensis): a hillstream loach species native to the riverine fauna of China

== See also ==
- Sucker (disambiguation)
- Fish (disambiguation)
- Sucker barb (Barbichthys laevis), a ray-finned fish species
- Sucker catfish (disambiguation)
- Suckermouth
