= Sucker =

Sucker may refer to:

== General use ==
- Lollipop or sucker, a type of confection
- Sucker (slang), a slang term for a very gullible person
- Hard candy
  - Cough drop
  - Mint (candy)

== Biology ==
- Sucker (botany), a term for a shoot that arises underground from the roots of a tree or shrub
- Sucker (zoology), various adhesive organs
- Suckerfish (disambiguation)

== In arts and entertainment ==
=== Film and television ===
- Suckers (film), a 1999 comedy-drama film directed by Roger Nygard
- The Suckers, a 1972 sexploitation film directed by Stu Segall
- "The Sucker" (The Amazing World of Gumball), a 2018 episode of The Amazing World of Gumball
- Sucker, a 2011 horror film produced by Kimberley Kates
- "Suckers", a 2003 episode of the fourth season of CSI: Crime Scene Investigation
- Suckers, an animated television series by Spanish animation studio BRB Internacional

=== Books ===
- Suckers: How Alternative Medicine Makes Fools of Us All, a 2008 book about alternative medicine written by Rose Shapiro

=== Music ===
- Suckers (band), a Brooklyn-based band
- Sucker (Charli XCX album), a 2014 album and its title track by Charli XCX
- Sucker (Ian Sweet album), a 2023 album by Ian Sweet
- "Sucker" (song), a 2019 song by the Jonas Brothers
- "Sucker", a 1994 song by Baboon from Face Down in Turpentine
- "Sucker", a 1973 song by The J.B.'s from Doing It to Death
- "Sucker", a 2024 song by Marcus King from Arcane League of Legends: Season 2
- "Sucker", a 1972 song by Mott the Hoople from All the Young Dudes
- "Sucker", a 2000 song by New Found Glory from New Found Glory
- "Sucker", a 2000 song by Peaches from The Teaches of Peaches
- "Sucker", a 1999 song by Self from Breakfast with Girls
- "Suckers!", a 2007 song by Super Furry Animals from Hey Venus!

== See also ==
- Sücka
- Sucker Lake (disambiguation)
- Suckermouth
- Sucker punch (disambiguation)
- Sucker River
- Sucker State, unofficial nickname for Illinois
- Suction cup
- No Sucker, a 2020 song by Lil Baby and Moneybagg
