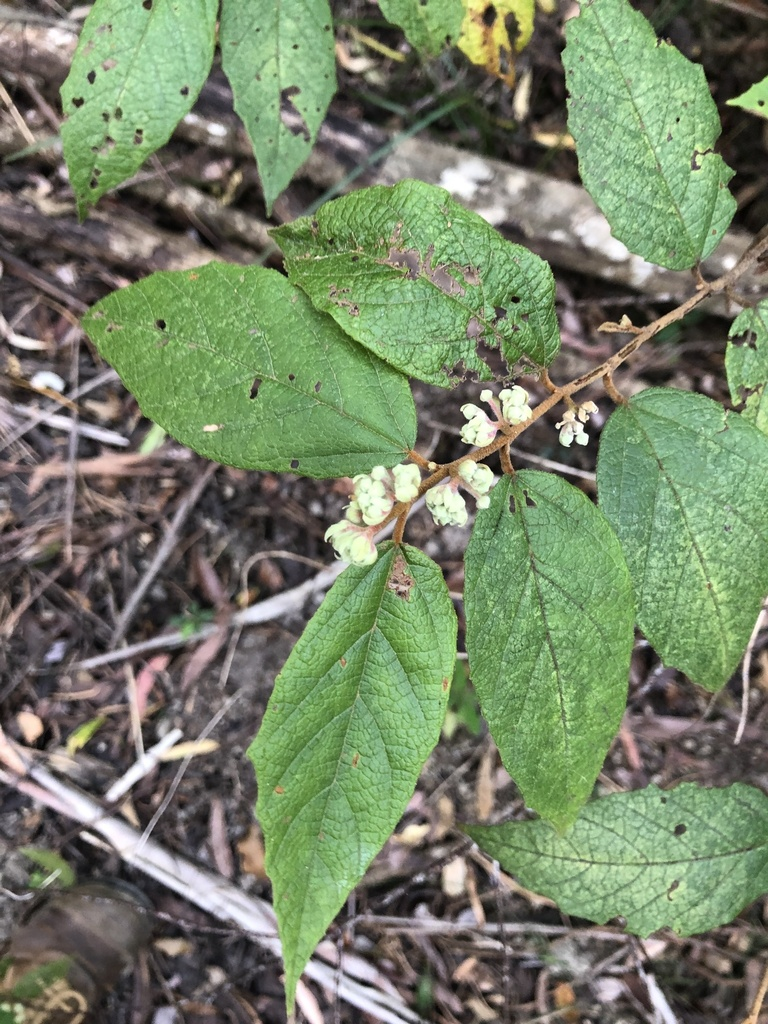
- In the Nightcap National Park

Scientific classification
- Kingdom: Plantae
- Clade: Tracheophytes
- Clade: Angiosperms
- Clade: Eudicots
- Clade: Rosids
- Order: Malvales
- Family: Malvaceae
- Genus: Seringia
- Species: S. arborescens

Binomial name
- Seringia arborescens (Aiton) Druce

Synonyms
- Gaya platyphylla Spreng. nom. illeg.; Lasiopetalum arborescens W.T.Aiton; Seringea platyphylla F.Muell. orth. var.; Seringia platyphylla J.Gay nom. illeg., nom. superfl.; Seringia platyphylla J.Gay isonym

= Seringia arborescens =

Species of tree

Seringia arborescens is a species of flowering plant in the family Malvaceae and is endemic to eastern Australia. It is an erect, spreading shrub or small tree with egg-shaped to lance-shaped leaves and cream-coloured or greenish-white flowers, usually in groups of 10 to 40.

== Description ==
Seringia arborescens is an erect, spreading shrub that typically grows up to 2–4 m (6 ft 7 in – 13 ft 1 in) high and 2 m (6 ft 7 in) wide, but sometimes a small tree up to 8 m (26 ft). Its young branches are covered with rust-coloured, woolly hairs. The leaves are egg-shaped to lance-shaped, 50–150 mm (2.0–5.9 in) long and 15–60 mm (0.59–2.36 in) wide on a petiole 5–10 mm (0.20–0.39 in) long, with narrow stipules 2–4 mm (0.079–0.157 in) long at the base of the petiole. The upper surface of the leaves is more or less glabrous, the lower surface with raised veins and a dense covering of fine, star-shaped hairs. The flowers are cream-coloured or greenish-white, in cymes of 10 to 40 on a hairy peduncle 2–12 mm (0.079–0.472 in) long, each flower on a hairy pedicel 3–7 mm (0.12–0.28 in) long with bracts less than 5 mm (0.20 in) long, but that fall off as the flowers open. The sepal lobes are 3–5 mm (0.12–0.20 in) long, densely hairy on the back and more or less glabrous on the front. There are no petals but 5 tiny staminodes, and the anthers are yellow. Flowering occurs from June to October, and the fruit is a capsule, 5–10 mm (0.20–0.39 in) in diameter and covered with rust-coloured hairs.

== Taxonomy ==
This species was first formally described in 1811 by William Aiton, who gave it the name Lasiopetalum arborescens in his Hortus Kewensis from specimens collected by George Caley. In 1917, George Claridge Druce transferred the species to Seringia as S. arborescens. The specific epithet (arborescens) means "becoming tree-like".

== Distribution and habitat ==
Seringia arborescens grows in forest, often along the banks of rivers, and occurs in near-coastal areas from Danbulla in Queensland to Ulladulla in New South Wales.
