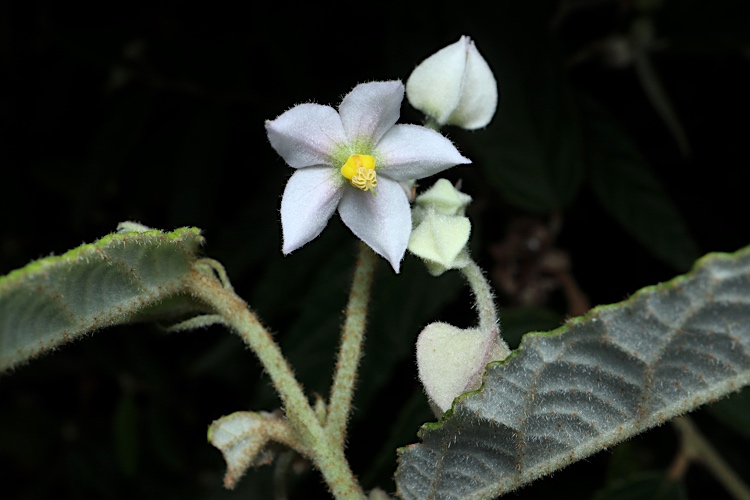
- In the Australian National Botanic Gardens

Scientific classification
- Kingdom: Plantae
- Clade: Tracheophytes
- Clade: Angiosperms
- Clade: Eudicots
- Clade: Rosids
- Order: Malvales
- Family: Malvaceae
- Genus: Seringia
- Species: S. denticulata

Binomial name
- Seringia denticulata (C.T.White) C.F.Wilkins

Synonyms
- Keraudrenia corollata var. denticulata C.T.White; Keraudrenia sp. (Chermside S.T.Blake 23068); Seringia sp. (Chermside S.T.Blake 23068)

= Seringia denticulata =

Species of flowering plant

Seringia denticulata is a species of flowering plant in the family Malvaceae and is endemic to eastern Australia. It is a spindly shrub, densely covered with rust-coloured hairs, has egg-shaped to elliptic leaves and usually white flowers in groups of 6 to 10.

== Description ==
Seringia denticulata is a single-stemmed, spindly shrub densely covered with rust-coloured hairs. It typically grows up to 1–2 m (3 ft 3 in – 6 ft 7 in) high and wide. Its leaves are egg-shaped to elliptic, 150–180 mm (5.9–7.1 in) long and 5–35 mm (0.20–1.38 in) wide on a petiole 3–8 mm (0.12–0.31 in) long, with broad stipules 3–6 mm (0.12–0.24 in) long at the base. The edges of the leaves are toothed, the upper surface wrinkled and dark green, and the lower surface is densely covered with pale hairs. The flowers are white, up to 12 mm (0.47 in) wide, borne in groups of 6 to 10 on a peduncle 5–12 mm (0.20–0.47 in) long, each flower on a pedicel 8–11 mm (0.31–0.43 in) long. The sepals are 5–8 mm (0.20–0.31 in) long, joined at the base for less than half their length, and there are usually no petals. The staminodes are tiny, and the filaments are yellow and about the same length as the anthers. Flowering occurs from August to February and the fruit is a hairy capsule 6–10 mm (0.24–0.39 in) wide and 8–17 mm (0.31–0.67 in) wide.

== Taxonomy ==
This species was first formally described in 1942 by Cyril Tenison White who gave it the name Keraudrenia corollata var. denticulata in the Proceedings of the Royal Society of Queensland from specimens collected near Aspley in 1928. In 2016, C.F.Wilkins raised the variety to species status as S. denticulata in Australian Systematic Botany. The specific epithet (denticulata) means "toothed", referring to the edges of the leaves.

== Distribution and habitat ==
Seringia denticulata grows in sandstone country in forest from Tully Falls in far north Queensland to near Brisbane in Queensland, but has also been recorded as far south as Grafton in New South Wales, and near the Colo River.

== Conservation ==
The species has been listed as "least concern" under the Queensland Government Nature Conservation Act 1992.
