= Seringia saxatilis =

Scientific classification
- Kingdom: Plantae
- Clade: Tracheophytes
- Clade: Angiosperms
- Clade: Eudicots
- Clade: Rosids
- Order: Malvales
- Family: Malvaceae
- Genus: Seringia
- Species: S. saxatilis

Binomial name
- Seringia saxatilis C.F.Wilkins

Synonyms
- Keraudrenia saxatilis C.F.Wilkins MS; Keraudrenia hermanniifolia auct. non J.Gay: Grieve, B.J. (1998)

Species of flowering plant

Seringia saxatilis, commonly known as gorge fire-bush, is a species of flowering plant in the mallow family and is endemic to Kalbarri National Park in Western Australia. It is a sprawling, open shrub with hairy young stems, oblong to broadly elliptic leaves and purple flowers arranged in groups of 3 to 6.

== Description ==
Seringia saxatilis is a sprawling, open shrub that typically grows to a height of 0.4–1 m (1 ft 4 in – 3 ft 3 in), about 1 m (3 ft 3 in) wide, and has hairy stems. The leaves are oblong to broadly elliptic, mostly 2–8 mm (0.079–0.315 in) long and 4–5 mm (0.16–0.20 in) wide on a petiole up to 2.5 mm (0.098 in) long with stipules up to 2 mm (0.079 in) long at the base. The leaves are lobed, crinkled and undulating, with deeply impressed veins on the upper surface. The flowers are arranged in a cyme with 3 to 6 flowers on a peduncle 4–9 mm (0.16–0.35 in) long, each flower on a pedicel 2–8 mm (0.079–0.315 in) long. The flowers are 15 mm (0.59 in) wide and purple with petal-like sepals joined at the base to form a tube with lobes 75% the length of the tube. Petals are absent and the stamens have yellow filaments, and dark coloured anthers. Flowering occurs from July to October.

== Taxonomy ==
In 1999, Carolyn F. Wilkins described Seringia saxatilis in the journal Australian Systematic Botany from specimens collected in Kalbarri National Park in 2010. The specific epithet (saxatilis) means "dwelling among rocks".

== Distribution and habitat ==
This species of seringia is only known from the Kalbarri area where it grows among sandstone boulders in the Geraldton Sandplains bioregions of Western Australia.

== Conservation status ==
Seringia saxatilis is listed as "Priority Two" by the Western Australian Government Department of Biodiversity, Conservation and Attractions, meaning that it is poorly known and from only one or a few locations.
