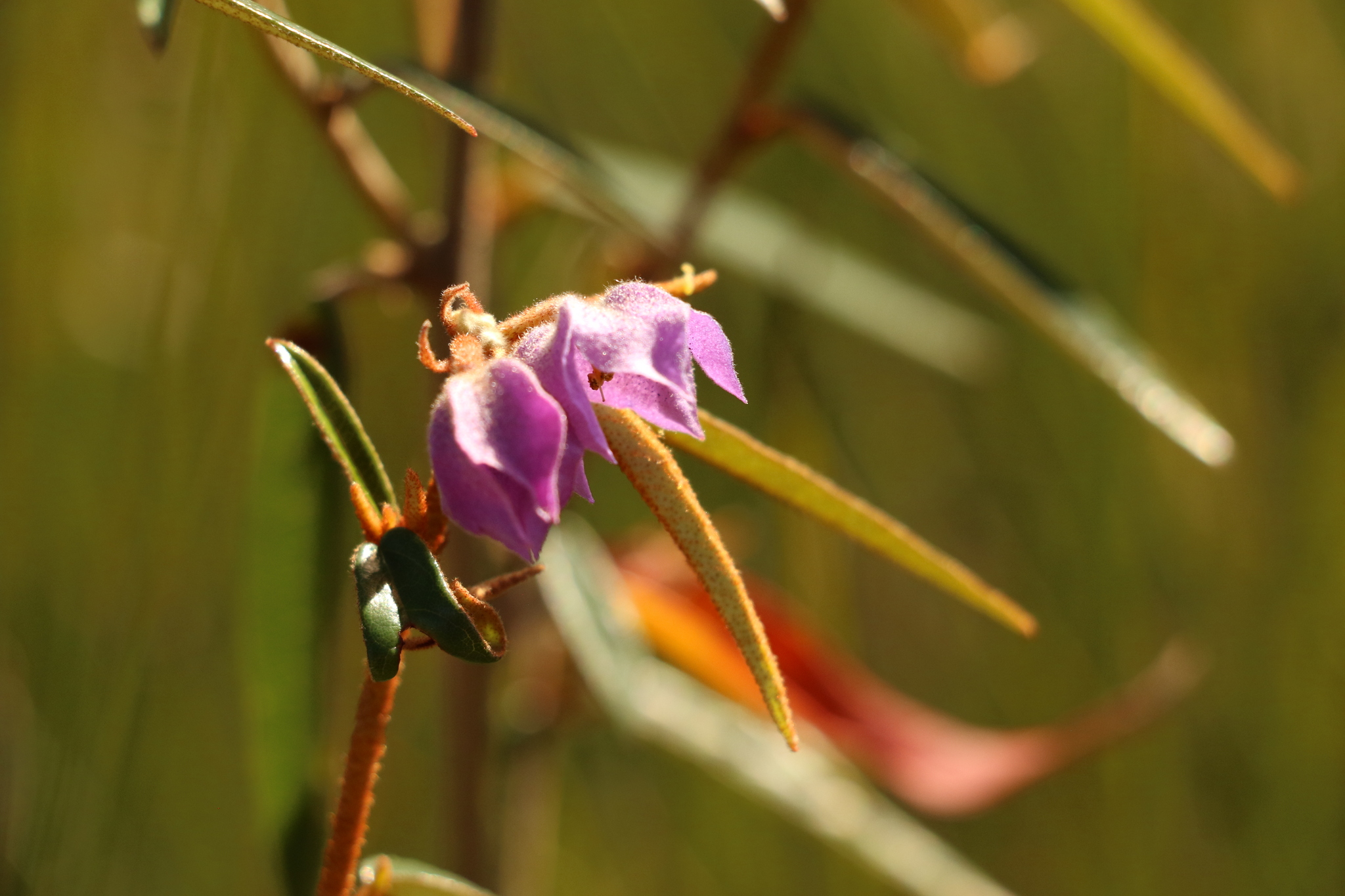
- In Moogerah Peaks National Park

Scientific classification
- Kingdom: Plantae
- Clade: Tracheophytes
- Clade: Angiosperms
- Clade: Eudicots
- Clade: Rosids
- Order: Malvales
- Family: Malvaceae
- Genus: Seringia
- Species: S. hillii

Binomial name
- Seringia hillii (F.Muell. ex Benth.) F.Muell.

Synonyms
- Keraudrenia hillii F.Muell. ex Benth.; Keraudrenia hillii F.Muell. ex Benth. var. hillii; Keraudrenia hillii var. velutina C.T.White; Seringea hillii F.Muell. orth. var.

= Seringia hillii =

Species of shrub

Seringia hillii is a species of flowering plant in the mallow family and is endemic to eastern Australia. It is a single-stemmed shrub with hairy new growth, egg-shaped leaves and usually mauve flowers arranged in groups of 2 to 9.

== Description ==
Seringia hermanniifolia is a single-stemmed shrub that typically grows to a height of 1–3 m (3 ft 3 in – 9 ft 10 in) and 1.0–1.5 m (3 ft 3 in – 4 ft 11 in) wide, its new growth covered with rust-coloured hairs. The leaves are egg-shaped to linear or lance-shaped, 40–90 mm (1.6–3.5 in) long and usually 4–8 mm (0.16–0.31 in) wide on a petiole up to 10 mm (0.39 in) long with narrow, leaf-like stipules 2–8 mm (0.079–0.315 in) long at the base. The flowers are arranged in a cyme with 2 to 9 flowers up to 20 mm (0.79 in) wide, on a peduncle 5–15 mm (0.20–0.59 in) long, each flower on a pedicel 5–15 mm (0.20–0.59 in) long. The flowers are mauve, sometimes white or pink, with deeply divided sepals. There are no petals, the stamens alternate with the staminodes, and the filaments are yellow and twice as long as the anthers. Flowering occurs in most months with a peak in spring and summer, and the fruit is a spherical capsule 12–15 mm (0.47–0.59 in) in diameter.

== Taxonomy ==
This species was first formally described in 1863 by George Bentham who gave it the name Keraudrenia hillii in Flora Australiensis from an unpublished description by Ferdinand von Mueller. In 1882, Ferdinand von Mueller transferred the species to Seringia as S. hillii in his Systematic Census of Australian Plants. The specific epithet (hillii) honours Walter Hill.

== Distribution and habitat ==
This species grows around cliffs and in rocky country near Stanthorpe, the Glasshouse Mountains and Mount Barney in south-east Queensland and on the coast and ranges north from Port Stephens in New South Wales.

== Conservation status ==
Seringia hillii is listed as of "least concern" in Queensland by the Queensland Government Department of Environment and Science.
