= Sucker Lake =

Sucker Lake may refer to:

In Ontario, Canada:

- Sucker Lake (Manitoulin), a lake in the municipality of Assiginack, Manitoulin District
- Sucker Lake (Nipissing District), in the Unorganized North Part of Nipissing District

In the United States:

- Oswego Lake, a lake in Lake Oswego, Oregon, United States, known as Sucker Lake until 1913
- Sucker Lake (New York), in St. Lawrence County
