= Seringia adenolasia =

Scientific classification
- Kingdom: Plantae
- Clade: Tracheophytes
- Clade: Angiosperms
- Clade: Eudicots
- Clade: Rosids
- Order: Malvales
- Family: Malvaceae
- Genus: Seringia
- Species: S. adenolasia

Binomial name
- Seringia adenolasia F.Muell.

Synonyms
- Keraudrenia adenolasia F.Muell. nom. inval., pro syn.; Keraudrenia adenolasia (F.Muell.) F.M.Bailey; Seringea adenolasia F.Muell. orth. var.

Species of flowering plant

Seringia adenolasia is a species of flowering plant in the family Malvaceae and is endemic to northern Australia. It is a sticky, aromatic densely hairy shrub with egg-shaped to lance-shaped leaves sometimes with toothed edges, and creamy-pink or purple flowers, usually in groups of up to 5.

== Description ==
Seringia adenolasia is a sticky, aromatic shrub that typically grows up to 3 m (9.8 ft) high and 1 m (3 ft 3 in) wide, its branchlets, upper leaf surfaces and flower stalks densely covered with star-shaped hairs and many short, glandular hairs. The leaves are egg-shaped to lance-shaped, 25–115 mm (0.98–4.53 in) long and 10–60 mm (0.39–2.36 in) wide on a petiole 2–12 mm (0.079–0.472 in) long, with narrow triangular to egg-shaped stipules 2–8 mm (0.079–0.315 in) long at the base. The base of the leaves is heart-shaped, the lower surface white, and the edges sometimes with 2 or 3 lobes 2–8 mm (0.079–0.315 in) long. The flowers are creamy-pink or purple, about 13 mm (0.51 in) wide, borne in groups of up to 5 on a peduncle 5–15 mm (0.20–0.59 in) long, each flower on a pedicel 5–15 mm (0.20–0.59 in) long with elliptic bracts 3–6 mm (0.12–0.24 in) long at the base. The five sepals are 4–9 mm (0.16–0.35 in) long and densely hairy. The petals and staminodes are tiny, and the anthers are yellow. Flowering occurs from February to September, and the fruit is a globe-shaped capsule, 10–12 mm (0.39–0.47 in) in diameter and covered with soft bristles.

== Taxonomy ==
Seringia adenolasia was first formally described in 1877 by Ferdinand von Mueller in his Fragmenta Phytographiae Australiae from specimens collected by William Edington Armit. The specific epithet (adenolasia) means "hairy gland".

== Distribution and habitat ==
This fire-bush grows in open woodland on rocky hills and escarpments in northern Queensland and in Kakadu and Nitmiluk National Parks in the Northern Territory.
