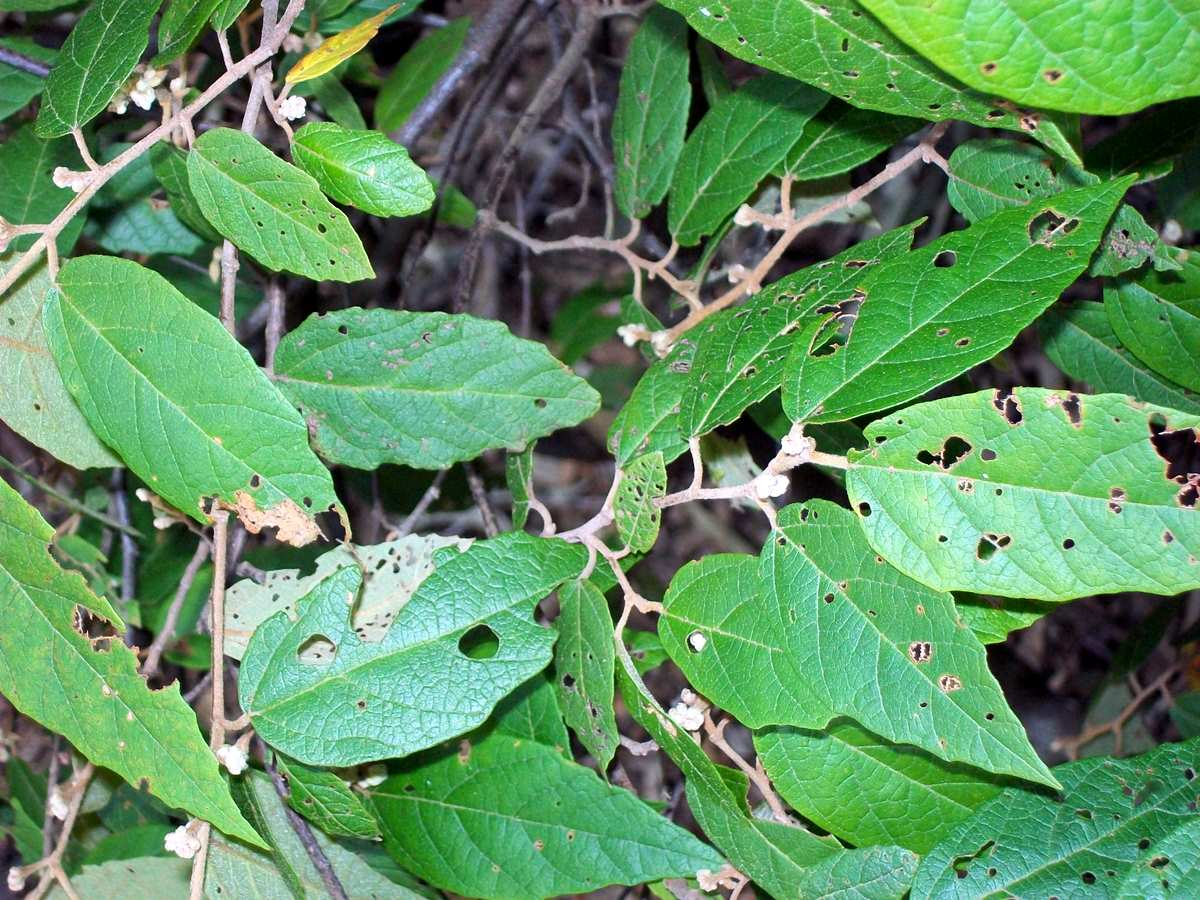
- Seringia arborescens

Scientific classification
- Kingdom: Plantae
- Clade: Tracheophytes
- Clade: Angiosperms
- Clade: Eudicots
- Clade: Rosids
- Order: Malvales
- Family: Malvaceae
- Subfamily: Byttnerioideae
- Tribe: Lasiopetaleae
- Genus: Seringia; J.Gay (1821)

Synonyms
- Gaya Spreng. (1824), nom. illeg., nom. superfl.; Kerandrenia Steud. orth. var.; Keraudrenia J.Gay (1821); Keraudrenia J.Gay isonym; Seringea F.Muell. orth. var.; Seringia J.Gay isonym

= Seringia =

Genus of trees

Seringia is a genus of about 18 species of plants in the family Malvaceae. Species of Seringia are native to Australia, New Guinea, and Madagascar. They are small shrubs with soft silken leaves. The flowers are purple or mauve and appear in profusion. The calyx is the most conspicuous part of the flower.

The following is a list of Seringia species recognised by the Plants of the World Online:

- Seringia adenogyna C.F.Wilkins – skinny-leaved fire-bush (Western Australia)
- Seringia adenolasia F.Muell. – northern Northern Territory and north-central Queensland
- Seringia arborescens W.T.Aiton – southeastern Queensland and eastern New South Wales
- Seringia botak Cheek – New Guinea
- Seringia cacaobrunnea C.F.Wilkins – Western Australia
- Seringia collina (Domin) C.F.Wilkins & Whitlock – Queensland
- Seringia corollata Steetz – northeastern Northern Territory, Queensland, and New South Wales
- Seringia denticulata (C.T.White) C.F.Wilkins – Queensland and New South Wales
- Seringia exastia (C.F.Wilkins) C.F.Wilkins & Whitlock – Western Australia
- Seringia hermanniifolia F.Muell. – northwestern and western Western Australia
- Seringia hillii (F.Muell. ex Benth.) F.Muell. – Queensland and New South Wales
- Seringia hookeriana (Walp.) F.Muell. – Western Australia and Northern Territory
- Seringia integrifolia (Steud.) F.Muell. – Western Australia and Northern Territory
- Seringia × katatona (C.F.Wilkins) C.F.Wilkins & Whitlock – Western Australia
- Seringia macrantha (Baill.) C.F.Wilkins & Whitlock – Madagascar
- Seringia nephrosperma F.Muell. – New South Wales, Northern Territory, Queensland, South Australia, and Western Australia
- Seringia saxatilis C.F.Wilkins – Western Australia
- Seringia undulata C.F.Wilkins – Western Australia
- Seringia velutina (Steetz) F.Muell. – Western Australia
