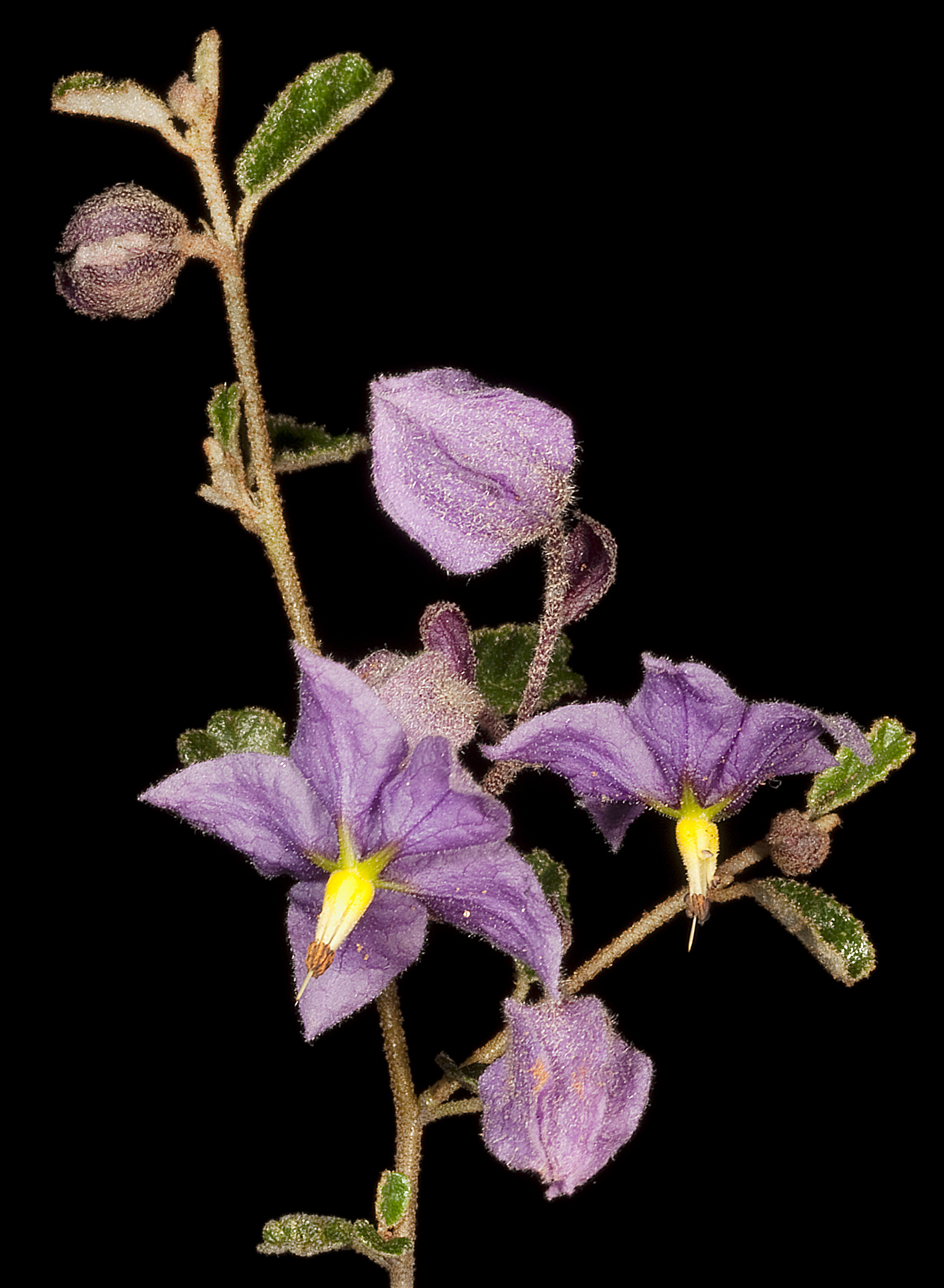

Scientific classification
- Kingdom: Plantae
- Clade: Embryophytes
- Clade: Tracheophytes
- Clade: Angiosperms
- Clade: Eudicots
- Clade: Rosids
- Order: Malvales
- Family: Malvaceae
- Genus: Seringia
- Species: S. integrifolia

Binomial name
- Seringia integrifolia (Steud.) F.Muell.

Synonyms
- List: Keraudrenia integrifolia Steud.; Keraudrenia integrifolia Steud. var. integrifolia; Seringea integrifolia F.Muell. orth. var.; Keraudrenia microphylla auct. non Steetz: Steetz, J. in Lehmann, J.G.C. (ed.) (1846); Keraudrenia velutina auct. non Steetz: Steetz, J. in Lehmann, J.G.C. (ed.) (1846)

= Seringia integrifolia =

Species of plant

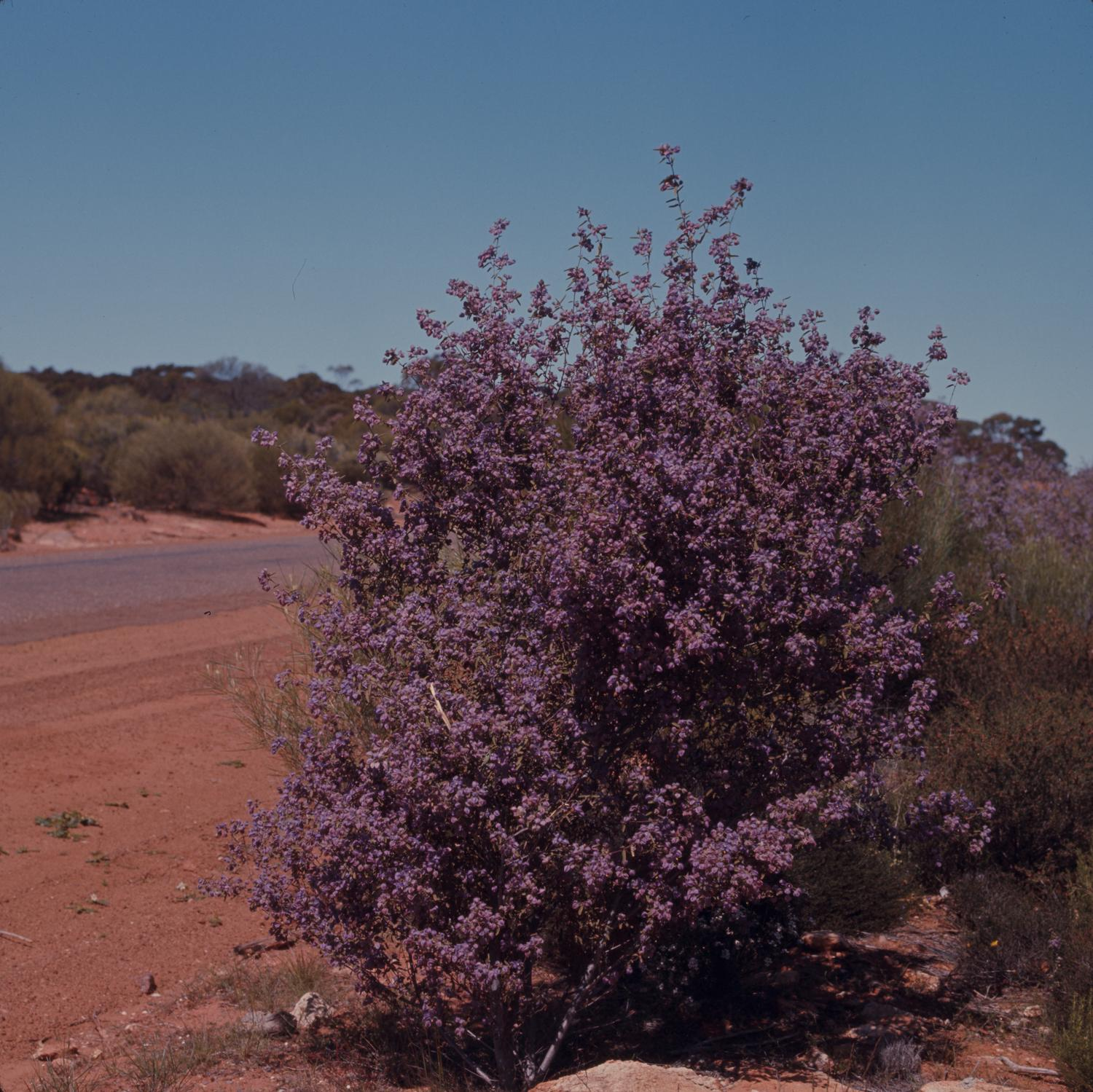
Flowering Seringia integrifolia in Coolgardie

Seringia integrifolia, commonly known as common firebush, is a species of flowering plant in the family Malvaceae and endemic to the south-west of Western Australia. It is a compact shrub, its new growth densely covered with star-shaped hairs, and has mostly narrowly leaves and many deep blue to purple flowers arranged in groups of 4 to 10.

== Description ==
Seringia integrifolia is a compact, suckering shrub that typically grows to a height of 0.5–1.5 m (1 ft 8 in – 4 ft 11 in) and 0.5–2.5 m (1 ft 8 in – 8 ft 2 in) wide and often forms dense, extensive colonies, its new growth densely covered with pale or rust-coloured hairs. The leaves are narrowly oblong, sometimes narrowly elliptic, 2–15 mm (0.079–0.591 in) long and 2–7 mm (0.079–0.276 in) wide on a less than petiole 2.5 mm (0.098 in) long with leaf-like stipules 1–2 mm (0.039–0.079 in) long sometimes present at the base. The flowers are arranged in groups of 4 to 10 on a linear peduncle 2–10 mm (0.079–0.394 in) long, each flower on 20 mm (0.79 in) in diameter on a pedicel 5–15 mm (0.20–0.59 in) long. The flowers are deep blue to purple, the petals are absent, and the stamens have golden filaments and tiny staminodes. Flowering occurs from August to November, and the fruit is a spherical capsule up to 12 mm (0.47 in) in diameter.

== Taxonomy ==
This species was first formally described in 1845 by Ernst Steudel, who gave it the name Keraudrenia integrifolia in Lehmann's Plantae Preissianae from specimens collected near the Swan River in 1839. The specific epithet (integrifolia) means "whole-leaved", referring to the leaves that lack serrations or lobes.

In 1860, Ferdinand von Mueller changed the name to Seringia integrifolia in his Fragmenta Phytographiae Australiae.

== Distribution and habitat ==
Seringia integrifolia grows in heathy shrubland and open woodland between Carnamah and Quairading with a disjunct population near Hopetoun in the Avon Wheatbelt, Esperance Plains, Geraldton Sandplains, Jarrah Forest, Swan Coastal Plain and Yalgoo bioregions of south-western Western Australia.
