= Catfish Creek =

Catfish Creek may refer to:

== Creeks ==
- Catfish Creek (Florida) — see Allen David Broussard Catfish Creek Preserve State Park
- Catfish Creek (Iowa)
- Catfish Creek (Chartiers Creek tributary), a stream in Washington County, Pennsylvania
- Catfish Creek (Texas)
- Catfish Creek (Lake Erie, Elgin), in Ontario's Elgin County
- Catfish Creek (Lake Erie, Norfolk), a tributary to Ontario's Lynn River, in Norfolk County

== Other ==
- Catfish Creek Baptist Church, Latta, South Carolina, on the National Register of Historic Places
