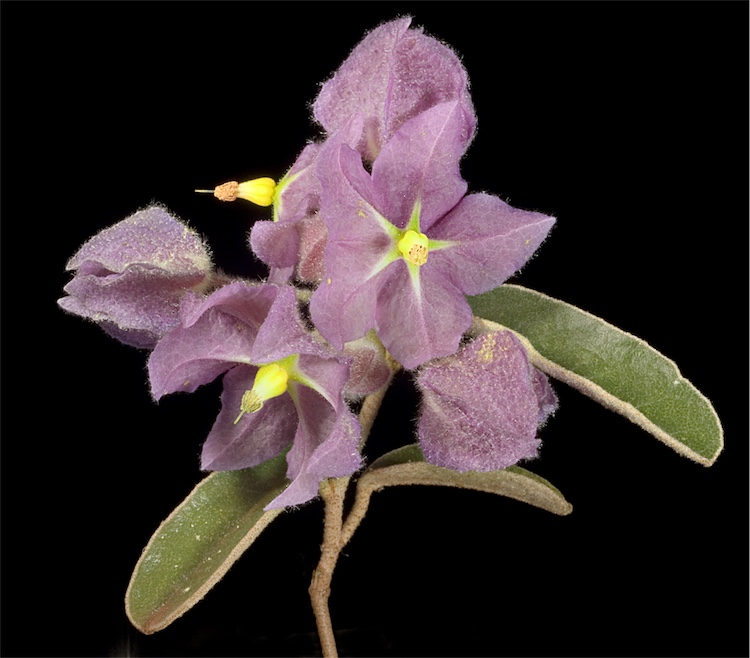
- In Karijini National Park

Scientific classification
- Kingdom: Plantae
- Clade: Tracheophytes
- Clade: Angiosperms
- Clade: Eudicots
- Clade: Rosids
- Order: Malvales
- Family: Malvaceae
- Genus: Seringia
- Species: S. exastia

Binomial name
- Seringia exastia (C.F.Wilkins) C.F.Wilkins & Whitlock

Synonyms
- Keraudrenia exastia C.F.Wilkins

= Seringia exastia =

Species of flowering plant

Seringia exastia, also known as fringed fire-bush, is a species of flowering plant in the mallow family and is endemic to northern Western Australia. It is an erect, compact shrub with hairy young branches, narrowly egg-shaped, elliptic or oblong leaves and purple flowers arranged in groups of 7 to 9.

== Description ==
The species grows as an erect, compact and multi-stemmed shrub that typically grows to a height of 70–90 cm (28–35 in) and has hairy stems. The leaves are arranged alternately, narrowly egg-shaped, elliptic or oblong, mostly 15–20 mm (0.59–0.79 in) long and 5–10 mm (0.20–0.39 in) wide on a petiole 3–6 mm (0.12–0.24 in) long with egg-shaped stipules 1.5–4 mm (0.059–0.157 in) long at the base. The flowers are arranged in a cyme 15–22 mm (0.59–0.87 in) long with 7 to 9 flowers on a peduncle 2–3 mm (0.079–0.118 in) long, each flower on a pedicel 4–7 mm (0.16–0.28 in) long. The flowers are purple with petal-like sepals 9–12 mm (0.35–0.47 in) and joined at the base to form a tube with lobes 65–80% the length of the tube. Petals are usually absent, the staminodes narrowly triangular and 1.3 mm (0.051 in) long, and the filaments and anthers are yellow. Flowering occurs from April to December.

== Taxonomy ==
In 1999, Carolyn F. Wilkins described Keraudrenia exastia in the journal Nuytsia from specimens collected on the Dampier Peninsula in 1995. In 2016, Wilkins and Barbara Ann Whitlock changed the name to Seringia exastia in Australian Systematic Botany. The specific epithet (exastia) means "rough edge" or "fringe", referring to the fringed edge of the calyx and bract.

== Distribution and habitat ==
The plant is found in the Carnarvon, Central Ranges, Coolgardie, Dampierland, Gascoyne, Gibson Desert, Great Sandy Desert, Great Victoria Desert, Little Sandy Desert, Murchison, Pilbara and Yalgoo IBRA bioregions of Western Australia. It grows on pindan heathland.

== Conservation status ==
Seringia exastia is listed as "not threatened" by the Western Australian Government Department of Biodiversity, Conservation and Attractions.
