= Catfish Mountain =

Mountain peak in New Jersey, United States

Highest point
- Elevation: 1,560 ft (480 m) NGVD 29
- Prominence: 280 ft (85 m)
- Coordinates: 41°2′51″N 74°58′21″W

Geography
- Location: Warren County, New Jersey, U.S.
- Parent range: Kittatinny Mountains

Climbing
- Easiest route: Hiking

Catfish Mountain is a peak of the Kittatinny Mountains in Warren County, New Jersey, United States. The mountain stands 1,560 feet (475 m) in height. It lies along the Appalachian Trail in the Delaware Water Gap National Recreation Area. Catfish Pond is to the southwest; it is drained by Yards Creek, which flows through Catfish Pond Gap.
