= Sucker Lake (Manitoulin) =

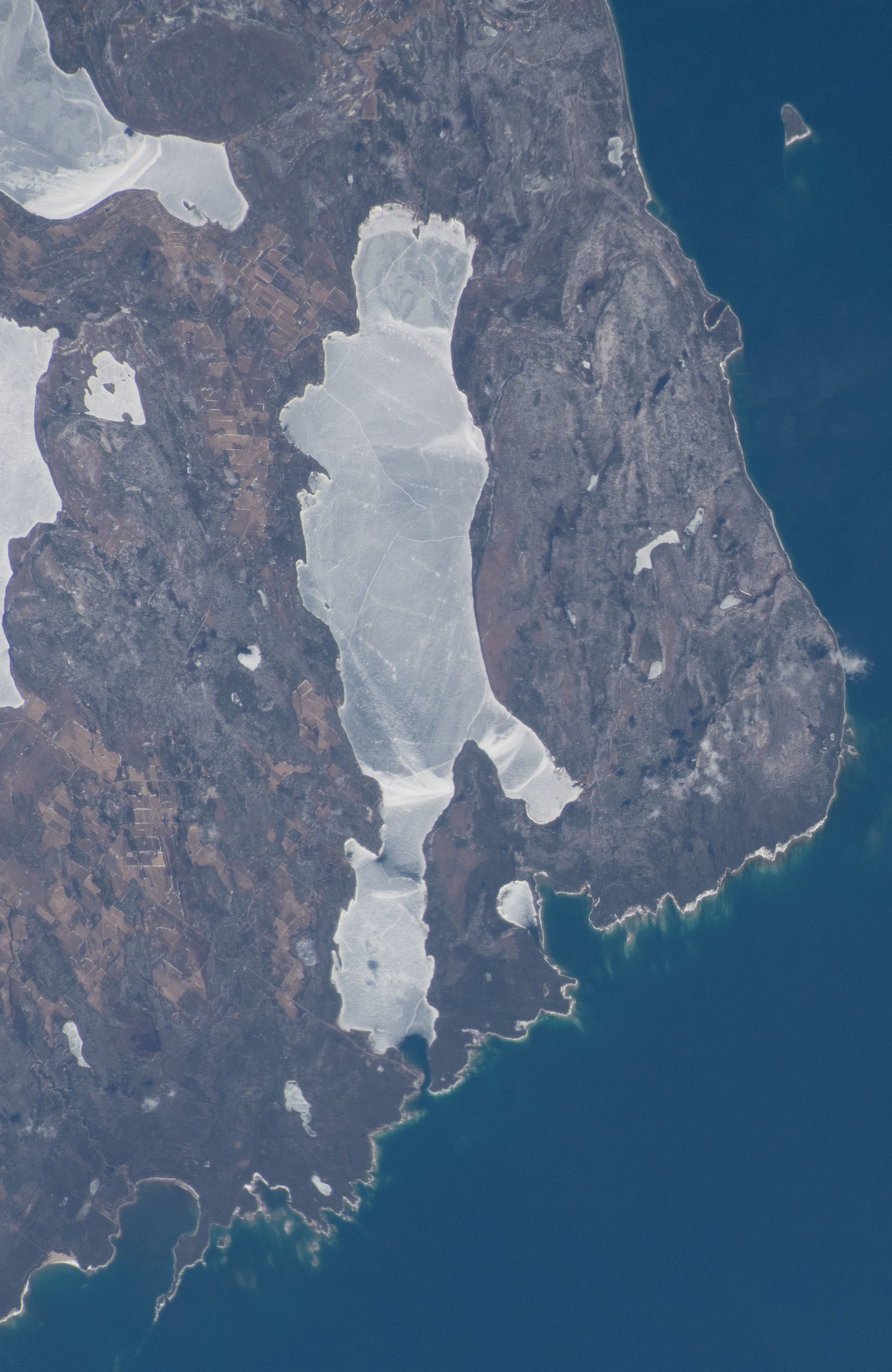
- Sucker Lake is covered in ice on the left side, just to the right of the edge of Lake Manitou along the left border and between Lake Manitou and South Bay which is also frozen over. North is oriented towards the upper left in this photo taken from the International Space Station on April 10, 2022.

- Location in Ontario
- Location: Manitoulin District, Ontario
- Coordinates: 45°43′18″N 81°52′21″W
- Type: Endorheic lake
- Basin countries: Canada
- Surface elevation: 246 m (807 ft)
- Islands: 3

Sucker Lake is an endorheic lake in the municipality of Assiginack, Manitoulin District in Northeastern Ontario, Canada. It is on Manitoulin Island about 5 kilometres (3.1 mi) southwest of the community of Manitowaning and about 1.5 kilometres (0.93 mi) southeast of the much larger Lake Manitou. It has three islands, the largest of which is named Maple island, and there is a prevalent population of brown trout near a shoal off Bubs Island. The lake can be accessed from Sucker Lake Road, which connects to Ontario Highway 6.

== See also ==
- List of lakes in Ontario
