= Mudcat =

Mudcat may refer to:

== Sports teams ==
- Carolina Mudcats, a minor league baseball team in Zebulon, North Carolina, U.S.
- Columbus Mudcats, were a Minor League Baseball team in Georgia
- Dunnville Jr. Mudcats, a Junior ice hockey team in Dunnville, Ontario, Canada
- Topeka Mudcats, a women's professional American football team in Kansas, U.S.

== Other use ==
- Flathead catfish, also called mudcat
- Mudcat Café, a folk music website
- Mudcat Grant (1935–2021), American baseball player
- David Saunders (political strategist), American political consultant nicknamed Mudcat
