= Basal shoot =

Shoot growing from an adventitious bud

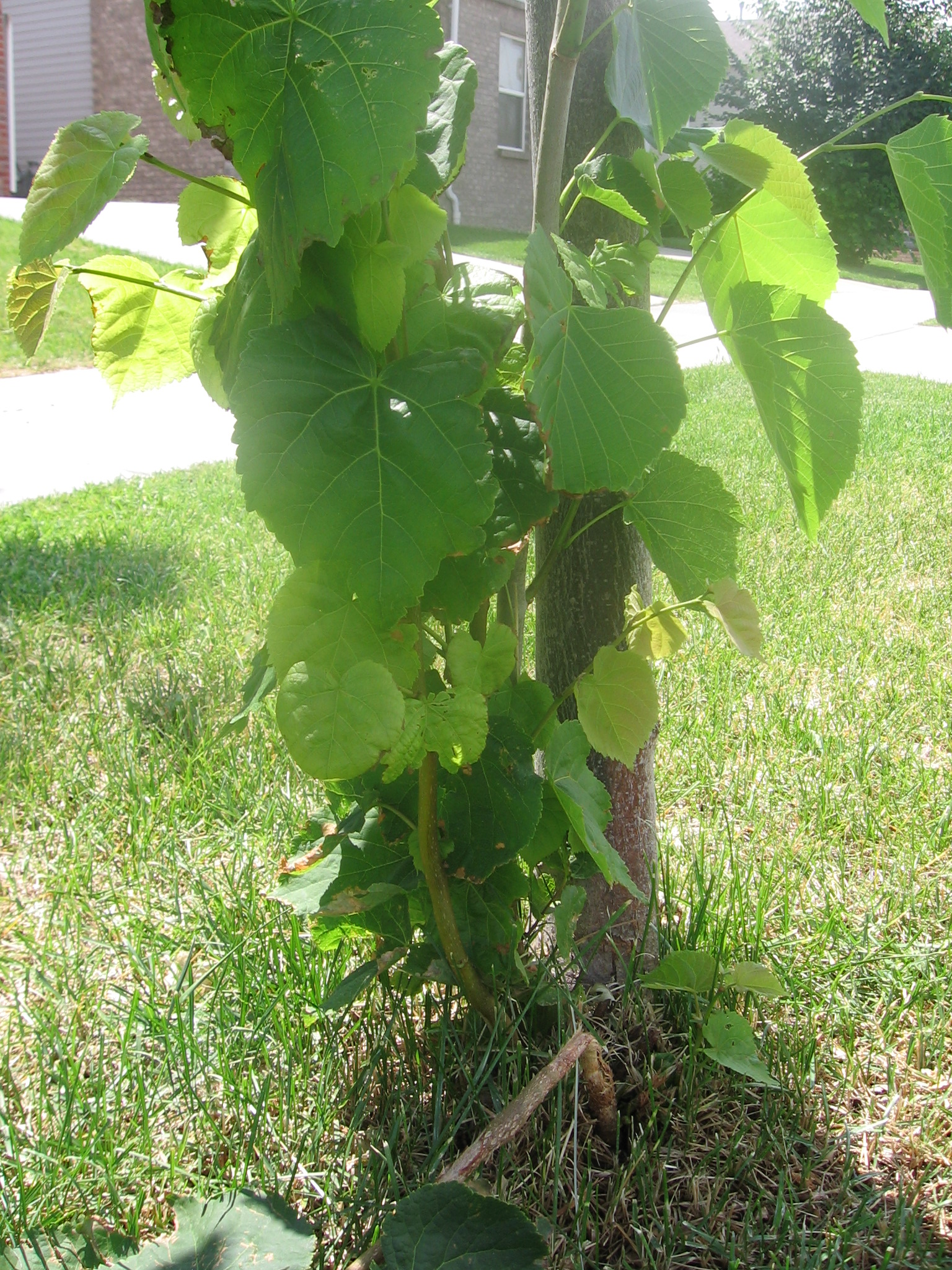
A basal shoot emerging from the base of a juvenile tree

Basal shoots, root sprouts, adventitious shoots, and suckers are words for various kinds of shoots that grow from adventitious buds on the base of a tree or shrub, or from adventitious buds on its roots. Shoots that grow from buds on the base of a tree or shrub are called basal shoots; these are distinguished from shoots that grow from adventitious buds on the roots of a tree or shrub, which may be called root sprouts or suckers. A plant that produces root sprouts or runners is described as surculose. Water sprouts produced by adventitious buds may occur on the above-ground stem, branches or both of trees and shrubs. Suckers are shoots arising underground from the roots some distance from the base of a tree or shrub.

== In botany and ecology ==
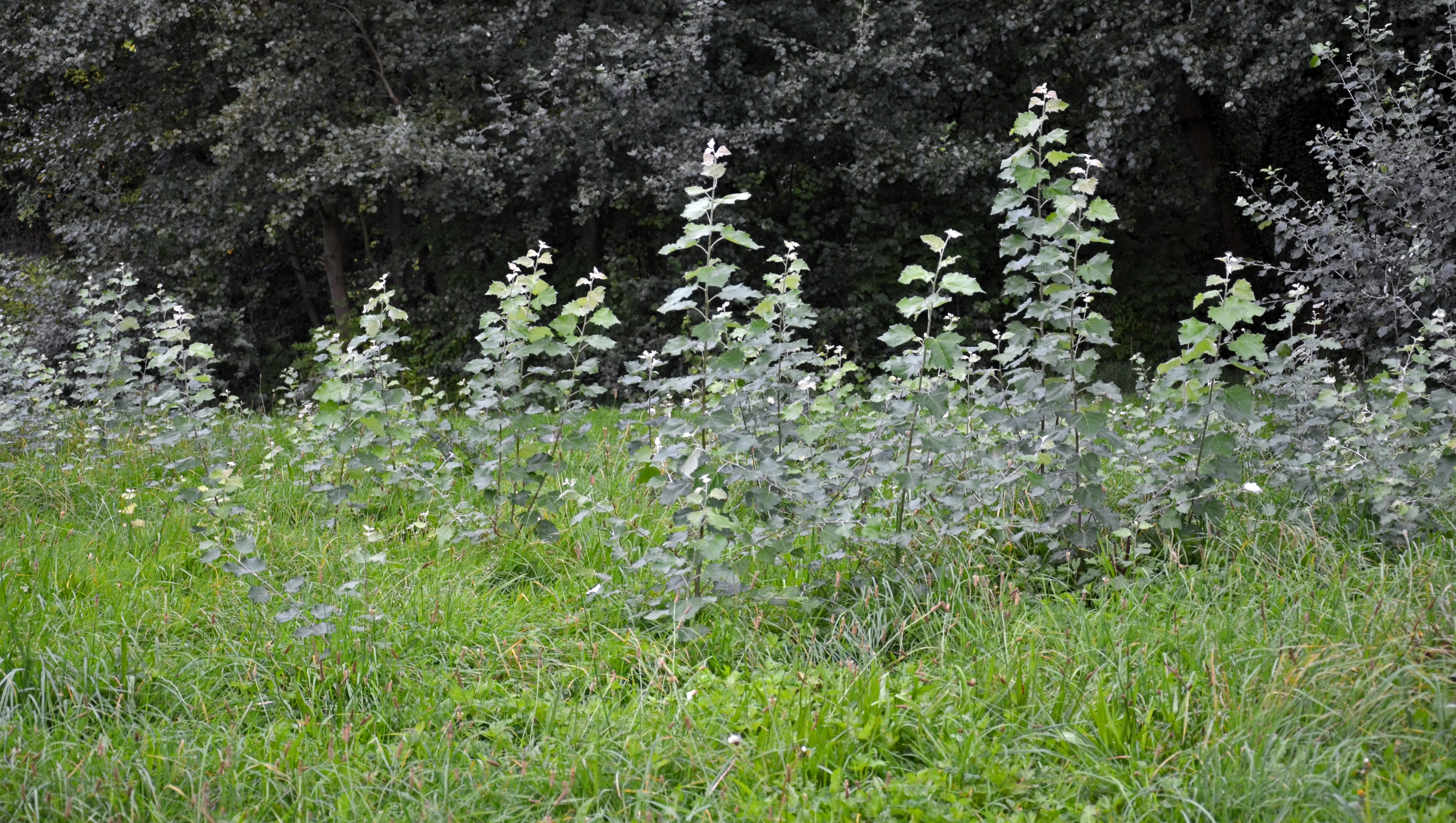
Poplar root sprouts (suckers) emerging along the root of an originating tree (not visible)

In botany, a root sprout or sucker is a severable plant that grows not from a seed but from the meristem of a root at the base of or a certain distance from the original tree or shrub. Root sprouts may emerge a substantial distance from the base of the originating plant, are a form of vegetative dispersal, and may form a patch that constitutes a habitat in which that surculose plant is the dominant species. Root sprouts also may grow from the roots of trees that have been felled. Tree roots ordinarily grow outward from their trunks a distance of 1.5 to 2 times their heights, and therefore root sprouts can emerge a substantial distance from the trunk.

This is a phenomenon of natural "asexual reproduction", also denominated "vegetative reproduction". It is a strategy of plant propagation. The complex of clonal individuals and the originating plant comprise a single genetic individual, i.e., a genet. The individual root sprouts are clones of the original plant, and each has a genome that is identical to that of the originating plant from which it grew. Many species of plants reproduce through vegetative reproduction, e.g., Canada thistle, cherry, apple, guava, privet, hazel, lilac, tree of heaven, and Asimina triloba.

The root sprout is a form of dispersal vector that allows plants to spread to habitats that favor their survival and growth. Some species, such as poplars and blackthorn, produce root sprouts that can spread rapidly, and they can form thick mats of roots that can reclaim areas that have been cleared of vegetation by logging, erosion, pasturing. The giant aspen, "Pando" is a dramatic example. These plants could be considered invasive, but they are cultivated or permitted to grow to stabilize soils and even to then be naturally replaced by non-pioneer species in locations as such those that have been developed for public works and along channels of waterways that may flood and reservoirs. These plants form shaded areas wherein new species may grow and gradually replace them.

Stolons are stems that grow on the surface of the soil or immediately below it and form adventitious roots at their nodes, and new clonal plants from the buds. Not all horizontal plant stems are stolons. Plants with stolons are described as "stoloniferous". Stolons, especially those above the surface of the soil are often called "runners". Rhizomes, in contrast, are root-like stems that may either grow horizontally on the surface of the soil or in other orientations underground.

== In horticulture ==
Root sprouts and basal shoots can be used to propagate woody plants. Root sprouts can be dug or severed with some of the roots still attached. As for basal shoots, stool beds involve cutting a juvenile plant near the surface of the soil and heaping soil over the cut so that basal shoots will form adventitious roots and later can be severed to form multiple, rooted, new plants. The technique is used especially for vegetative propagation of rootstocks for apple trees.
