= The Ultimate Collection (Four Tops album) =

Compilation album by The Four Tops
- Released: October 7, 1997
- Recorded: 1964–1972
- Genre: Pop, soul
- Length: 72:32
- Label: Motown
- Producer: Harry Weinger

The Four Tops chronology
Christmas Here with You (1995)	The Ultimate Collection (1997)

Professional ratings
Review scores
Source	Rating
Allmusic	5/5 stars

The Ultimate Collection is a greatest hits album by The Four Tops, released on Motown Records, catalogue 314530825-2, in October 1997, being their first album released after Lawrence Payton's death four months prior. It is a collection of singles comprising many of the group's greatest hits, with liner notes written by Stu Hackel.

== Content ==
The disc contains all but three of the Top 40 hits on the Billboard Hot 100 enjoyed by the Four Tops and released on the Motown Records imprint. Four of the tracks included were b-sides — "I Got A Feeling," "If You Don't Want My Love," "I'll Turn to Stone," and "Sad Souvenirs" — "I Got A Feeling" being the flip to "Bernadette," and "Sad Souvenirs" the flip to "I Can't Help Myself." "A Simple Game" was recorded in collaboration with The Moody Blues, and hit #3 on the UK Singles Chart. Every iconic song by the group is present, and five of the tracks were in the top ten on the chart, with "I Can't Help Myself" and "Reach Out I'll Be There" both going to #1. The disc was part of an "Ultimate Collection" series issued that year by Motown for many of their top-selling classic artists.

Starting in the late 1960s and early 1970s, standard industry practice shifted to a focus on album sales, where a single became less a separate entity and more simply an advertisement for an LP, and a lead single would be pulled off an album as a promotional tool. Prior to this, singles were concentrated upon as a profitable commodity, especially for smaller record labels, and albums were often built around already successful singles. Since Motown fixated on the hit single until the very end of its stay in Detroit, single versions of songs often featured different mixes than versions that would be later placed on albums. Singles were usually mixed "punchier" and "hotter" to sound better on car radios receiving AM broadcast. The single versions are the ones appearing here.

== Personnel ==
- Levi Stubbs – lead baritone vocals
- Abdul "Duke" Fakir –first tenor vocals
- Renaldo "Obie" Benson – bass vocals
- Lawrence Payton – second tenor vocals
- The Andantes – additional soprano backing vocals on certain tracks
- The Funk Brothers – instruments
- Members of the Detroit Symphony Orchestra conducted by Gordon Staples – strings

== Track listing ==
Singles chart peak positions from Billboard charts; no R&B chart existed from November 30, 1963, through January 23, 1965. Track with The Moody Blues marked with an asterisk. All tracks written by Brian Holland, Lamont Dozier, and Edward Holland, Jr., except where noted.

Track	Catalogue	Release date	Pop Chart	R&B Chart	Song title	Writer(s)	Time
1.	Motown 1098	8/18/66	#1	#1	"Reach Out I'll Be There"		2:59
2.	Motown 1102	11/28/66	#6	#2	"Standing in the Shadows of Love"		2:36
3.	Motown 1104	2/16/67	#4	#3	"Bernadette"		3:00
4.	Motown 1073	1/5/65	#24	#9	"Ask the Lonely"	William "Mickey" Stevenson and Ivy Jo Hunter	2:45
5.	Motown 1062	7/10/64	#11		"Baby I Need Your Loving"		2:44
6.	Motown 1069	11/64	#43		"Without the One You Love (Life's Not Worth While)"		2:53
7.	Motown 1081	7/9/65	#5	#2	"It's the Same Old Song"		2:45
8.	Motown 1096	5/9/66	#45	#12	"Loving You Is Sweeter Than Ever"	Stevie Wonder, Hunter	2:45
9.	Motown 1076	4/23/65	#1	#1	"I Can't Help Myself (Sugar Pie, Honey Bunch)"		2:43
10.	Motown 1084	10/21/65	#19	#9	"Something About You"		2:48
11.	Motown 1104b	2/16/67			"I Got a Feeling"		2:59
12.	Motown 1132	10/68	#51	#23	"I'm in a Different World"		3:05
13.	Motown 1119	1/18/68	#14	#15	"Walk Away Renée"	Michael Brown, Bob Calilli, Tony Sansome	2:43
14.	Motown 1147	4/10/69	#53		"What Is a Man"	Johnny Bristol and Doris McNeil	2:33
15.	Motown 1196	1/4/72	#90	#34	"A Simple Game" *	Mike Pinder	2:56
16.	Motown 1170	8/70	#11	#4	"Still Water (Love)"	Frank Wilson and Smokey Robinson	3:11
17.	Motown 1210	8/72	#53	#8	"(It's the Way) Nature Planned It"	Pam Sawyer, Wilson	3:18
18.	Motown 1164	4/70	#24	#6	"It's All in the Game"	Charles G. Dawes and Carl Sigman	2:50
19.	Motown 1113	9/67	#19	#7	"You Keep Running Away"		2:48
20.	Motown 1113b	9/67			"If You Don't Want My Love"		3:27
21.	Motown 1110	5/4/67	#14	#10	"7-Rooms of Gloom"		2:53
22.	Motown 1110b	5/4/67			"I'll Turn to Stone"	Holland–Dozier–Holland, R. Dean Taylor	2:33
23.	Motown 1090	2/2/66	#18	#5	"Shake Me, Wake Me (When It's Over)"		2:41
24.	Motown 1076b	4/23/65			"Sad Souvenirs"	Stevenson and Hunter	2:39
25.	Motown 1127	6/27/68	#49	#31	"Yesterday's Dreams"	Sawyer, Vernon Bullock, Jack Goga, Hunter	2:56

== Charts ==
Chart (2026)	Peak position
Greek Albums (IFPI)	10

== Certifications ==
Region	Certification	Certified units/sales
United Kingdom (BPI)	Gold	100,000^{‡}
^{‡} Sales+streaming figures based on certification alone.
