= Yesterday's Dreams =

Yesterday's Dreams may refer to:

- "Yesterday's Dreams" (song), a 1968 single by the Four Tops
- Yesterday's Dreams (Four Tops album), 1968
- Yesterday's Dreams (Alphonso Johnson album), 1976
- Yesterday's Dreams (TV series), a British romantic drama television series
