= Stay with Me (Kiki Dee album) =

Studio album by Kiki Dee
- Released: 1979
- Studio: Cherokee Studios (Hollywood, California); Studio 55 (Los Angeles, California); Redwing Studios (Tarzana, California); Celebration Recording Studios (New York City, New York)
- Genre: Rock; pop
- Length: 35:13
- Label: The Rocket Record Company
- Producer: Bill Schnee

Kiki Dee chronology
| Kiki Dee (1977) | Stay with Me (1979) | Greatest Hits (1980) |

Stay with Me is the sixth studio album by English singer Kiki Dee, released by the Rocket Record Company in 1978. The album was reissued by EMI in 2008 on CD with two bonus tracks.

The album's lead single was the title track, released in November 1978. Although it gained airplay on UK radio, it failed to enter the UK Singles Chart. The second single, "One Jump Ahead of the Storm", suffered a similar fate when released in January 1979.

== Background ==
In 2008, Dee recalled of the album, "I remember making this album as being a wonderful experience and I got the chance to work with some amazing musicians. I was living a lot of the time in Los Angeles which was a really vibrant place to be in the late 70s. The title track was a great challenge for me to cover after the brilliant Lorraine Ellison original, but I loved every minute of it. I am also very proud of my vocal on 'Dark Side of Your Soul' which I think is one of my best."

== Critical reception ==
Professional ratings
Review scores
| Source | Rating |
|---|---|
| AllMusic | 3/5 stars |

Upon its release, the Evening Express praised Stay with Me as a "super album" and concluded, "Whether it's uptempo or downbeat, Kiki handles them all with professional aplomb." James Belsey of the Bristol Evening Post called it a "nice, solid set", with "One Jump Ahead of the Storm" as the highlight, but still felt the overall album was "below her potential" as the "material lets her down". The Stage considered that, having recorded the album in Los Angeles, Dee "comes out, unfortunately, sounding like every other California-based singer". Bob Mullett of the Birmingham Evening Mail noted that Dee comes across as a "sophisticated white soul singer of some competence", but added "while the whole thing is pleasing, it never sweeps me off my feet". Pat Stevens of the Nottingham Evening Post described it as "tasteful, rather than inspired" as the tracks "all seem to merge into one another", with the exception of the title track, which Stevens felt Dee "sings just as well, if not better, than the original".

In a retrospective review, Joe Viglione of AllMusic stated that the album is "a perfect example of how the wrong pairing of artist and producer can have drastic results". He commented that Bill Schnee's production lacked the "passion" seen on Dee's 1973 album Loving & Free and the "directness and authority" of her 1981 album Perfect Timing. He praised Dee for being in "good voice", but felt the album contained "glossy adult contemporary music which switches hats too many times" and originals that "don't go any further than being nice album tracks".

== Track listing ==
| No. | Title | Writer(s) | Length |
|---|---|---|---|
| 1. | "One Step" | Tom Snow, Glen Ballard | 3:26 |
| 2. | "Talk to Me" | Kiki Dee, David Lasley, Zane Buzby | 3:27 |
| 3. | "Don't Stop Loving Me" | Dee, Lasley, Buzby | 4:17 |
| 4. | "Dark Side of Your Soul" | Dee, Lasley, Buzby | 4:04 |
| 5. | "Stay with Me Baby" | Jerry Ragavoy, George David Weiss | 3:58 |
| 6. | "One Jump Ahead of the Storm" | Troy Seals, Joe New | 3:23 |
| 7. | "You're Holding Me Too Tight" | Frannie Golde, Cynthia Weil | 3:58 |
| 8. | "Love Is a Crazy Feeling" | Bias Boshell, Davey Johnstone | 4:21 |
| 9. | "Safe Harbour" | Lasley, Lana Marrano | 4:19 |

2008 EMI CD bonus tracks
| No. | Title | Writer(s) | Length |
|---|---|---|---|
| 10. | "The Loser Gets to Win" | Dee, Harry Bogdanovs, Gary Osborne | 3:22 |
| 11. | "I Want Our Love to Shine" | Dee, Bogdanovs | 3:58 |

== Personnel ==
- Kiki Dee – lead vocals, backing vocals
- Bias Boshell – keyboards
- Victor Feldman – keyboards, percussion
- James Newton Howard – keyboards, synthesizers, synthesizer programming
- David Paich – keyboards
- Greg Phillinganes – keyboards
- Steve Porcaro – synthesizers, synthesizer programming
- Tom Snow – keyboards
- Davey Johnstone – electric guitar, acoustic guitar, mandolin, sitar, backing vocals
- Steve Lukather – electric guitar
- Bob Glaub – bass
- David Hungate – bass
- Jim Keltner – drums
- Jeff Porcaro – drums
- Jim Horn – horns, horn arrangements
- Chuck Findley – horns
- Steve Madaio – horns
- Reginald "Sonny" Burke – string arrangements and conductor (3)
- Marty Paich – string arrangements and conductor (5, 9)
- Gene Page – string arrangements and conductor (7)
- Susan Collins – backing vocals
- Donny Gerrard – backing vocals
- Venette Gloud – backing vocals
- David Lasley – backing vocals
- Arnold McCuller – backing vocals
- Sharon Robinson – backing vocals
- Brenda Russell – backing vocals
- Carmen Twillie – backing vocals

Production

- Bill Schnee – producer, engineer
- George Augsperger – assistant engineer
- Frank "Cheech" D'Amico – assistant engineer
- Sheridan Eldridge – assistant engineer
- Tim Dennen – assistant mix engineer
- Gabe Veltri – assistant mix engineer
- Doug Sax – mastering
- Mike Reese – mastering
- John Kosh – art direction, design
- David Alexander – photography
