= The Loser Gets to Win =

Single by Kiki Dee
- B-side: "(I Want Our) Love to Shine"
- Released: 14 October 1983
- Length: 3:20
- Label: EMI
- Songwriter(s): Kiki Dee; Harry Bogdanovs; Gary Osborne
- Producer(s): Elton John; Gary Osborne

Kiki Dee singles chronology
| "Loving You Is Sweeter Than Ever" (1981) | "The Loser Gets to Win" (1983) | "Amoureuse" (1984) |

"The Loser Gets to Win" is a song by English singer Kiki Dee, released on 14 October 1983 by EMI as a non-album single. The song was written by Dee, Harry Bogdanovs and Gary Osborne, and produced Elton John and Osborne.

== Background ==
"The Loser Gets to Win" was Dee's first release of new material since her seventh studio album Perfect Timing in 1981. After the disappointing commercial success of the album, except for the single "Star", Dee decided to spend some time away from the music industry. In 1983, she returned by signing to EMI and began managing herself for the first time in her career. "The Loser Gets to Win", a song which Dee co-wrote, was recorded at Air Studios with Elton John as a co-producer. John asked Dee if he could co-produce the song after he heard the demo recording of it.

"The Loser Gets to Win" was released as a single in October 1983, but it failed to reach the top 100 of the UK Singles Chart, stalling at number 105. As a result of its failure, EMI dropped Dee from the label without releasing any further material. Dee had hoped the single's success would allow her to embark on a tour and record a new studio album which would contain more of her own songwriting than previous efforts. Dee told the Reading Evening Post in 1983, "For once I have got total control. That means I choose which songs to sing, I don't have them thrust at me. Some of [my own songs] are very bad, but others are coming along very nicely and I hope they will make up the bulk on my new album." John was set to produce further material for Dee's album.

During the same period as the recording of "The Loser Gets to Win", Dee recorded another song, "Don't Cry", with producer Bruce Welch as a potential follow-up single. Reflecting on the failure of "The Loser Gets to Win" to The Guardian in 1984, Dee commented, "I put myself in a situation where if I didn't have a hit I didn't have any outlets to work. The record pays for the tour and the band."

== Critical reception ==
Upon its release, Jim Whiteford of the Kilmarnock Standard described "The Loser Gets to Win" as "pretty catchy material" on which Dee "brings her pop-rock polish". He added that the song "could go to the top 30 if TV and radio give the girl the blitz treatment". Tony Jasper of Music Week praised it as "an infectious number with a good chorus, which Dee delivers with the acquired pop skill of years". He also noted the "meritous" arrangement from Harry Bogdanovs. Debbi Voller of Number One noted Dee's "rich voice" and John's appearance as co-producer, but felt "good talent gets wasted here on a lousy song" and added that "the result is something that'll go straight through you".

== Track listing ==
7-inch single (UK, Germany, the Netherlands and Australasia)

1. "The Loser Gets to Win" – 3:20
2. "(I Want Our) Love to Shine" – 3:57

== Personnel ==
Credits are adapted from the UK 7-inch single sleeve notes.

Production

- Elton John – producer ("The Loser Gets to Win")
- Gary Osborne – producer ("The Loser Gets to Win")
- Renate Blauel – engineer ("The Loser Gets to Win")
- Harry Bogdanovs – arranger ("The Loser Gets to Win"), producer ("(I Want Our) Love to Shine")
- Kiki Dee – producer ("(I Want Our) Love to Shine")
- Pat Stapley – engineer ("(I Want Our) Love to Shine")

Other

- Mike Owen – photography
- Alex McDowell, Da Gama – sleeve design

== Charts ==
| Chart (1983) | Peak position |
|---|---|
| Australia (Kent Music Report) | 99 |
| UK Singles Chart | 105 |
