= Another Day Comes (Another Day Goes) =

Single by Kiki Dee

from the album Angel Eyes
- B-side: "Won't Make Sense (Barbed Wire Fence)"
- Released: 1986
- Length: 4:10
- Label: Columbia
- Songwriter: David A. Stewart
- Producers: David A. Stewart; Patrick Seymour

Kiki Dee singles chronology
"Amoureuse" (1984)	"Another Day Comes (Another Day Goes)" (1986)	"I Fall in Love Too Easily" (1987)

"Another Day Comes (Another Day Goes)" is a song by English singer Kiki Dee, released in 1986 as the first single from her eighth studio album Angel Eyes. The song was written by David A. Stewart and produced by Stewart and Patrick Seymour.

== Background ==
The song was recorded at the Church Studios and EMI Studios in London. In 2008, Dee recalled of working with Stewart on the track, "Dave opened up the channels for me recording again. I will always have a huge amount of respect for him and his music."

The song failed to reach the top 100 of the UK Singles Chart, stalling at number 117 in February 1986. It fared better in the Record Mirror Eurobeat chart, where the 12-inch format reached number 2 in April. The "Nightmare Mix" by Ian Levine, also released on 12-inch vinyl, then repeated the success by also reaching number 2 in May 1986.

== Critical reception ==
Upon its release, Phil McNeill of Number One considered "Another Day Comes (Another Day Goes)" to be "interesting" and predicted it would be a hit. He added, "This is kind of arhythmical, shuffling along at bewildering speed with a gospel chorus and trumpet solo." John Lee of the Huddersfield Daily Examiner felt Dee had "done better than this" in the past. He described the song as "a strange mix of styles" and "a pale imitation of Eurythmics, crossed with Kate Bush". He added that Dee's vocals sounded like "the female equivalent of Chris Rea". Music & Media picked the song as one of their "sure hits" in their issue of 22 February 1986.

Jerry Smith of Music Week stated that, despite Stewart's heavy involvement and appearances from Hugh Masekela on trumpet and Feargal Sharkey on backing vocals, it "still sounds like a sub-standard Eurythmics number". He added, "It would no doubt have benefited by having gone the whole way by using Annie Lennox as it doesn't suit Dee's voice." Edwin Pouncey of Sounds noted how Dee "sound[s] pretty similar" to Lennox, with a "House of Whipcord rhythm section sweating behind [her]". Penny Reel of NME called it an "ugly, monotonous and cliché-ridden high energy dirge" with "a nod in the direction of Eurythmics". She added that Dee "performs [it] with what [she] probably likes to think of as passion, or a prolonged screech to you and me".

== Track listing ==
7-inch single (UK, Europe, South Africa and Australasia)

1. "Another Day Comes (Another Day Goes)" – 4:10
2. "Won't Make Sense (Barbed Wire Fence)" – 3:37

12-inch single (UK, South Africa and Australasia)

1. "Another Day Comes (Another Day Goes)" (ET Adventure Mix) – 8:55
2. "Another Day Comes (Another Day Goes)" (Dance Mix) – 4:10
3. "Won't Make Sense (Barbed Wire Fence)" – 3:37
4. "Another Day Comes (Another Day Goes)" (Live Version – ET Mix) – 4:16

12-inch single (UK#2: "The Nightmare Re-mix")

1. "Another Day Comes (Another Day Goes)" (Nightmare Mix) – 11:28
2. "Another Day Comes (Another Day Goes)" (Nightmare Dub Mix) – 7:20

12-inch single (Europe)

1. "Another Day Comes (Another Day Goes)" (ET Adventure Mix) – 8:55
2. "Another Day Comes (Another Day Goes)" (Dance Mix) – 4:10
3. "Another Day Comes (Another Day Goes)" (Live Version – ET Mix) – 4:16

== Personnel ==
Credits are adapted from the UK 7-inch and 12-inch singles sleeve notes.

"Another Day Comes (Another Day Goes)"

- Kiki Dee – lead vocals, backing vocals
- David A. Stewart – guitar, backing vocals
- Patrick Seymour – keyboards, backing vocals
- Hugh Masekela – trumpet
- Olle Romo – drum programming
- Ralph Weekes Gospel Choir – backing vocals
- Feargal Sharkey – backing vocals

"Won't Make Sense (Barbed Wire Fence)"

- Kiki Dee – lead vocals
- Patrick Seymour – keyboards, percussion
- Jon Bavin – bass

Production

- David A. Stewart – producer ("Another Day Comes"), arranger ("Another Day Comes"), mixing ("Another Day Comes"), executive producer
- Patrick Seymour – producer ("Another Day Comes", "Won't Make Sense"), arranger ("Another Day Comes", "Won't Make Sense"), mixing ("Another Day Comes", "Won't Make Sense")
- Jon Bavin – engineer ("Another Day Comes"), mixing ("Another Day Comes", "Won't Make Sense")
- Ron Hill – engineer ("Another Day Comes")
- Chris Blair – mastering

Remixes

- David A. Stewart – mixing ("ET Adventure Mix", "ET Mix")
- Eric Thorngren – mixing ("ET Adventure Mix", "ET Mix")
- Ian Levine – remix ("Nightmare Mix", "Nightmare Dub Mix")
- Flood – remix engineer ("Nightmare Mix", "Nightmare Dub Mix")

Other

- The Cream Group – design
- Davies and Starr – photography

== Charts ==
Chart (1986)	Peak position
Netherlands (Tipparade)	11
UK Singles Chart	117
