= Carol Lloyd =

Carol Lloyd may refer to:

- Carol Lloyd (Australian singer) (1948–2017), Australian singer, songwriter, composer and advertising executive
- Carol Lloyd (American singer), American singer from Philadelphia, Pennsylvania
