= Love Carol =

Studio album by Carol Lloyd
- Released: 1983
- Studio: Alpha International Studios (Philadelphia)
- Length: 31:37
- Label: Philly World
- Producer: T.G. Conway; Michael Forte; Buddy Turner; Bruce Weeden; David Williams; Denise Williams

Carol Lloyd chronology
Score (1979)	Love Carol (1983)

Singles from Love Carol
- 1. "Come See About Me" Released: 1982

Love Carol is the second and final studio album released by American singer Carol Lloyd, released in 1983 by Philly World Records.

== Background and development ==
Several decades later, the Essential Media Group record label reissued Love Carol in a digital format on June 24, 2014. It was distributed to the iTunes Store in the United States and features "remastered" versions of all seven songs that appear on the album. It also featured the radio edit version of "Come See About Me", which had previously been unreleased. The same label reissued "Come See About Me" with B-side "I Just Want to Love You" on May 13, 2014.

== Promotion ==
Carol Lloyd released a cover of the Supremes' "Come See About Me" as the album's lead and only single in late 1982. It was distributed in the 7" and 12" vinyl formats and featured album track "I Just Want to Love You" as its B-side track. "Score", Lloyd's debut single which was previously used as the lead single on Score, is also included on Love Carol as the album's closing track.

== Track listing ==
Love Carol – Standard edition
No.	Title	Writer(s)	Producer(s)	Length
1.	"Come See About Me"	Brian Holland; Lamont Dozier; Eddie Holland	Buddy Turner	5:59
2.	"I Just Want to Love You"	Michael Forte	Bruce Weeden; Turner; Forte	3:45
3.	"Tonight"	Denise Williams; David Williams	Weeden; Forte	4:08
4.	"Mr. Ladies Man"	T.G. Conway	Conway; Turner	4:16
5.	"Baby, Baby I'm Yours"	Jimmy Ingram	Weeden; Forte	4:28
6.	"Oh, Baby Baby"	Denise Williams; David Williams	Denise Williams; David Williams	4:54
7.	"Score"	Forte	Weeden; Forte	4:07
Total length:				31:37

Love Carol – 2014 digital bonus track
No.	Title	Length
8.	"Come See About Me" (Radio Edit)	5:26
Total length:		37:03

== Personnel ==
Credits adapted from the liner notes of the vinyl edition of Love Carol.

- Carol Lloyd – vocals, backing vocals
- Al Alberts Jr. – engineering
- Michael Booghi – assistant engineering
- Robert Borland – assistant engineering
- T.G. Conway – production (track 4)
- Duke Forrester – assistant engineering
- Michael Forte – production (tracks 2, 3, 5, 7)
- Jason Robert Lyle – engineering
- Carolyn Mitchell – backing vocals
- Cheryl Solem – backing vocals
- The Ultimate Players – music
- Vaneese Thomas – backing vocals
- Buddy Turner – production (tracks 1, 2, 4), backing vocals
- Bruce Weeden – production (tracks 2, 3, 5, 7), engineering
- David Williams – production (track 6)
- Denise Williams – production (track 6)
- Jerry Williamson – engineering
