= Score (Carol Lloyd album) =

Studio album by Carol Lloyd
- Released: December 31, 1979
- Recorded: 1979
- Studio: Alpha International Studios (Philadelphia)
- Genre: Disco
- Length: 30:53
- Label: Casablanca; Earmarc
- Producer: Michael Forte; Bruce Weeden

Carol Lloyd chronology
Score (1979)	Love Carol (1983)

Singles from Score
- 1. "Score" Released: September 1979; 2. "Shake Me, Wake Me" Released: December 1979

Score is the debut album by American recording artist Carol Lloyd, released on December 31, 1979, through Casablanca Records and Earmarc Records. Following Lloyd's signing with Earmarc, a new label division of Casablanca, she began recording material for the record throughout the latter half of 1979. A disco album, Score was one of the first projects to be released from the label, which specialized solely in disco music. All six of the tracks on the record were produced by Michael Forte and Bruce Weeden, with the former individual also contributing lyrics to four of the aforementioned songs.

Lloyd released "Score" and "Shake Me, Wake Me" as singles to promote the album, with the latter receiving heavy airplay from disc jockeys, entering Billboard's Dance Club Songs chart at number 89, and being noted as a standout track from Score; the album was similarly well received by music critics. In the 2010s, Score was reissued by the Essential Media Group in two different formats, with the most recent one in 2016 featuring three bonus tracks.

== Background ==
American recording artist Carol Lloyd was first signed to Earmarc Records in August 1979, the new division of Casablanca Records headed by vice president of special projects, Marc Paul Simon. Earmarc Records would consist solely of artists releasing music in the disco genre, with Lloyd, the Duncan Sisters, Van Hinton, and Ricardo DeCampos to be among the first four artists signed to the newly founded company. The entire album was recorded and mixed at Alpha International Studios in Philadelphia throughout the latter half of 1979. Various collaborators helped out in creating Score, including saxophonist Mark Adler, design agency Gribbitt!, and drummer Robert Sonsini; also, mastering of the album's track took place at Sterling Sound Studios.

Several decades later, the Essential Media Group record label reissued Score in a digital format on May 11, 2010. It was distributed through the iTunes Store in the United States and features "remastered" versions of all six songs to appear on the album. The same label reissued "Score" with B-side "Shake Me, Wake Me" on May 27, 2014. One more reissued version of Score occurred on October 21, 2016; the previously unreleased "Expanded Edition" of Score included three bonus tracks that were exclusive to the digital release of the album. It included the 7" and 12" versions of "Shake Me, Wake Me" plus the 12" version of "Score", extending the number of the tracks on the record from six to nine.

== Singles ==
Lloyd's first commercial release with the label would be her single "Score", which would take place in September 1979. Serving as the album's lead single and the singer's debut single, "Score" was distributed in both 7" and 12" gramophone vinyl formats. It featured album track "Dream Dancer" as the B-side track, except on initial promotional printings where "Shake Me, Wake Me" was used instead. Michael Forte wrote and produced the track with Bruce Weeden serving as an additional producer; both Forte and Weeden also produced all of the album as well. The staff at Billboard would later include it in their "Top Single Picks" column on September 29 of the same year and listed it as a recommended track for readers of the magazine.

A cover of Four Tops's "Shake Me, Wake Me (When It' Over)", although "When It's Over" was omitted from the title, followed as the album's second and final single and was distributed in December 1979. It also was released in various versions alongside album and B-side track "Sundown to Sunrise", which was written by Bob Alan and Debra Barsha. It received heavy airplay by disc jockeys and was similarly featured in the "Top Single Picks" column by Billboard. The success of "Shake Me, Wake Me" allowed it to enter the Dance Club Songs chart, compiled by Billboard, where it peaked at number 89 on January 5, 1980.

== Reception ==
Score received generally favorable reviews from music critics. James Arena, who wrote Legends of Disco: Forty Stars Discuss Their Careers, compiled a list of various "somewhat noteworthy disco tracks" released in between the 1970s and 1980s; ultimately, he recommended the readers to listen to "Score", "Showdown", and "Shake Me, Wake Me" from the album as they were all "significant products of the disco era by important artists and worthy of a spin". Barry Lederer, a columnist for Billboard, referred to "Shake Me, Wake Me" as the "one exceptional cut" on Score. Referring to American vocalist Barbra Streisand's cover of the song in 1975, he claimed that Lloyd's version made the "already popular Streisand classic even better".

== Track listing ==
All tracks on Score produced by Michael Forte and Bruce Weeden.

Score – Standard edition
No.	Title	Writer(s)	Length
1.	"Score"	Michael Forte	4:07
2.	"Sundown to Sunrise"	Bob Alan; Debra Barsha	4:40
3.	"Plans for Tomorrow"	Forte	6:37
4.	"Shake Me, Wake Me"	Brian Holland; Lamont Dozier; Eddie Holland	3:48
5.	"Showdown"	Forte	5:44
6.	"Dream Dancer"	Forte	5:56
Total length:			30:53

Score – 2016 digital bonus tracks
No.	Title	Writer(s)	Length
7.	"Shake Me, Wake Me" (7" Version)	B. Holland; Dozier; E. Holland	2:49
8.	"Score" (12" Version)	Forte	6:00
9.	"Shake Me, Wake Me" (12" Version)	B. Holland; Dozier; E. Holland	6:13
Total length:			45:55

== Personnel ==
Credits adapted from the liner notes of the vinyl edition of Score.

- Carol Lloyd – vocals
- Mark Adler – alto saxophone
- Mike Bonghi – assistant engineer
- Ron Caesar – bass
- John Demartino – keyboards
- Danny Diangio – keyboards
- Michael Forte – arranging, guitar, production
- Geoff Genovese – creative director and consultant
- Gribbitt! – design and graphics
- Leza Holmes – backing vocals
- Renee Johnson – backing vocals
- Larrey Labes – bass
- Kenny Lipman – tenor saxophone, clarinet
- Howard Menken – photography
- Derick Murdock – bass
- Marc Paul Simon – art direction, design
- Jack Skinner – mastering
- Robert Sonsini – drums
- The Ultimate Players – strings, horns
- Ron Vitola – assistant engineer
- Larry Washington – percussion
- Bruce Weeden – guitar, recording, mixing
- Garfield Williams – drums
- Sharon Williams – backing vocals
- Jerry Williamson – assistant engineer

== Release history ==
Region	Date	Format(s)	Edition	Label	Ref.
United States	December 31, 1979	LP	Standard	Casablanca; Earmarc	
United States	May 11, 2010	Digital download	Standard	Essential Media Group	
United States	October 21, 2016	Digital download	Deluxe	Essential Media Group	
