= Loving and Free =

Studio album by Kiki Dee
- Released: 27 November 1973
- Recorded: 28 April – 22 June 1973
- Studio: AIR Studios and Nova Sound Studios (Marble Arch, London, UK)
- Genre: Pop
- Length: 39:46
- Label: The Rocket Record Company
- Producer: Elton John; Clive Franks

Kiki Dee chronology
Great Expectations (1970)	Loving and Free (1973)	I've Got the Music in Me (1974)

Professional ratings
Review scores
Source	Rating
Christgau's Record Guide	C+

Loving and Free is the third album by English singer Kiki Dee released in 1973 on The Rocket Record Company label. It was recorded at the AIR Studios and Nova Studios in London between 28 April and 22 June 1973.

In 1976 the title track was issued as an EP (b/w "Amoureuse") and reached No. 13 in the UK Singles Chart.

== Track listing ==
All tracks are written by Kiki Dee, except where noted.

Side one
No.	Title	Writer(s)	Length
1.	"Loving and Free"		4:21
2.	"If It Rains"		2:46
3.	"Lonnie & Josie"	Elton John; Bernie Taupin	4:25
4.	"Travellin' in Style"	Tetsu Yamauchi; John Bundrick; Simon Kirke; Paul Rodgers; Paul Kossoff	3:07
5.	"You Put Something Better Inside Me"	Joe Egan; Gerry Rafferty	4:34

Side two
No.	Title	Writer(s)	Length
6.	"Supercool"	John; Taupin	3:25
7.	"Rest My Head"		3:17
8.	"Amoureuse"	Véronique Sanson; Gary Osborne	4:08
9.	"Song for Adam"	Jackson Browne	5:23
10.	"Sugar on the Floor"		4:18

== Charts ==
Chart (1974)	Peak position
Australian (Kent Music Report)	38

== Personnel ==
- Kiki Dee – vocals
- Jimmy Hall – acoustic piano (1, 2, 4, 5, 7, 10), organ (2, 9)
- Elton John – electric piano (2, 7, 9, 10), Mellotron (3, 5, 10), acoustic piano (3, 6), organ (7), backing vocals (7)
- Ronnie Leahy – acoustic piano (8)
- Paul Keogh – guitars (1, 2, 4, 5, 9)
- Davey Johnstone – guitars (3, 6, 7, 10), electric guitar (8)
- Jimmy Ryan – acoustic guitar (8)
- B. J. Cole – pedal steel guitar (7, 10)
- Dee Murray – bass
- Dave Mattacks – drums (1, 4, 5, 8), percussion (4)
- Gerry Conway – drums (2, 7, 9, 10)
- Nigel Olsson – drums (3, 6)
- Roger Ball – saxophone (4)
- John Barham – orchestral arrangements (1, 8)
- Irene & Doreen Chanter – backing vocals (2, 4–6, 9, 10)
- Lesley Duncan – backing vocals (2, 4–6, 9, 10)
- Kay Garner – backing vocals (2, 4–6, 9, 10)

== Production ==
- Elton John – producer
- Clive Franks – producer, engineer
- Denny Bridges – assistant engineer
- Judy Szekely – assistant engineer
- Richard Dodd – orchestral engineer
- Steve Brown – photography
- David Costa – album design
