= Angel Eyes (Kiki Dee album) =

Studio album by Kiki Dee
- Released: 1987
- Length: 40:39
- Label: Columbia
- Producer: Patrick Seymour; Chris Kimsey; David A. Stewart

Kiki Dee chronology
Perfect Timing (1981)	Angel Eyes (1987)	Spotlight On Kiki Dee – Greatest Hits (1991)

Angel Eyes is the eighth studio album by English singer Kiki Dee, released by Columbia in 1987. The album was reissued by EMI in 2008 on CD with six bonus tracks.

Four singles were released from the album. Preceding its release was "Another Day Comes (Another Day Goes)" in 1986, which was released in the UK, Europe and Australasia. Written and co-produced by David A. Stewart, it failed to reach the top 100 of the UK Singles Chart, stalling at number 117. The following three singles, "I Fall in Love Too Easily", "Stay Close to You" and "Angel Eyes", were all released in the UK in 1987, but also failed to reach the top 100.

== Background ==
Angel Eyes was Dee's first album since 1981's Perfect Timing. Speaking to the Daily Record in 1987, she commented, "If this record isn't a success, I'll just keep on making them until I do break into the charts again. Let's face it, I've got nothing to lose." The album was not a commercial success and a few months later, Dee told The Press and Journal, "It got me back on the record scene again, but it was not an easy album to make. I have not had a lot of success with albums over the years but I am still hopeful that I might be able to do it." Dee embarked on a UK tour to promote the album.

== Critical reception ==
Professional ratings
Review scores
Source	Rating
AllMusic	2/5 stars
The Encyclopedia of Popular Music	3/4 stars

Upon its release, Paul Massey of the Evening Express commented, "Dee is undoubtedly middle-of-the-road and that's where she's at her best: disastrous in places when she tries to get funky or too serious. Otherwise, the title track and 'Keep It to Yourself' reveal a good voice singing good pop." Music & Media picked the album as one of their "albums of the week" in their issue of 11 July 1987. They noted the album contains ten "contagious soul/rock songs ranging from intimate ballads to exciting up-tempo material" and added that Dee "is doing a good job with her powerful, soulful vocals".

== Track listing ==
No.	Title	Writer(s)	Length
1.	"I Fall in Love Too Easily"	Barry Gilbert, David Freeman, Joseph Hughes	3:59
2.	"Stay Close to You"	Philip Caffrey, George Lamb	4:35
3.	"I'll Build a Tower Over You"	Patrick Seymour, Alan Gorrie	3:47
4.	"Pay"	Kiki Dee, Seymour	4:06
5.	"We Cry On"	Dee, Seymour, Phil Bishop	4:26
6.	"Angel Eyes"	Dee, Seymour	3:43
7.	"Knowing You Like I Do"	Seymour, Dee, Jon Bavin, Dean Garcia	4:08
8.	"Another Day Comes (Another Day Goes)"	David A. Stewart	4:46
9.	"Keep It to Yourself"	Seymour, Dee, Bavin	4:07
10.	"Good Times"	Dee, Seymour	3:12

2008 EMI CD bonus tracks
No.	Title	Writer(s)	Length
11.	"Africa"	Seymour, Dee	3:42
12.	"Don't Cry"	Stewart, Dee	5:00
13.	"Won't Make Sense (Barbed Wire Fence)"	Seymour, Dee	3:40
14.	"Beyond Control"	Seymour, Dee	4:08
15.	"I Fall in Love Too Easily" (Extended Mix)		5:45
16.	"Another Day Comes (Another Day Goes)" (Nightmare Mix)		11:32

== Personnel ==
Credits are adapted from the original 1987 vinyl LP sleeve notes and 2008 CD reissue liner notes.

Production

- Chris Kimsey – producer (1, 2, 6, 15), arranger (1)
- Hal Lindes – arranger (1)
- Patrick Seymour – producer (3–5, 7, 9, 10), arranger (3–5, 7, 9–11, 13, 14, 16)
- David A. Stewart – producer (8, 14, 16)
- Steve Brown – producer (12)

Other

- Nic Tompkin – photography
