= Rien que de l'eau =

1992 single by Véronique Sanson

Single by Véronique Sanson

from the album Sans Regrets
- B-side: "Jusqu'à la tombée du jour"
- Released: 1992
- Recorded: 1992
- Genre: Pop, chanson
- Length: 4:29
- Label: WEA
- Composer(s): Bernard Swell
- Lyricist(s): Bernard Swell, Véronique Sanson
- Producer(s): Bernard Saint-Paul

Véronique Sanson singles chronology
| "Paranoïa" (1989) | "Rien que de l'eau" (1992) | "Panne de cœur" (1992) |

"Rien que de l'eau" is a 1992 pop song recorded by French singer Véronique Sanson. Written by Bernard Swell and Sanson with a music composed by Swell, it was the lead single from her tenth studio album Sans Regrets, on which it appears as the fourth track, and was released in June 1992. It was a top ten in France and was heavily aired on radio, and became one of Sanson's most famous songs.

== Background and writing ==
"Rien que de l'eau" is a French adaptation of "I Wanna Know", a song written and composed by Bernard Swell, with whom Sanson lived in the 1980s. The original song in English was released as a single under Polydor label in 1991, but went mostly unnoticed. Sanson, who was preparing her new studio album Sans Regrets, asked Swell to keep the melody of "I Wanna Know", which she liked, and to use new lyrics in French; however, as she wrote one of the verses, she is credited as co-lyricist. Swell, who was mainly a composer, said he had difficulties finding lyrics, and that following the success of "Rien que de l'eau", he was asked to write for other artists, which he declined.

Lyrically, "Rien que de l'eau" is a tribute to water, presented as essential in human life, and may be linked to Sanson's 1988 song "Un peu d'air pur et hop !", which Télé Loisirs described as "another ecological anthem"; however, Sanson said in interviews that she does not promote activism or a political view on these issues. Sanson, who lived in Los Angeles when Swell wrote the song, found it adequate to write a text on the benefits of water, as California was experiencing severe droughts at that time.

== Live performances ==
"Rien que de l'eau" was performed live during Sanson's 1993 and 2005 concert tours and thus included on the live albums Zenith 93 (1993), Olympia 2005 (2013), as well as on Sanson's compilation Les Moments importants (2001).

On 26 April 2019, on the occasion of Sanson's 70th birthday anniversary two days earlier, Christine & The Queens performed a live cover of "Rien que de l'eau", broadcast in a French TV show on France 3. Sanson said she liked the cover and was very glad of this adaptation able to reach younger people and, as of August 2019, the performance, posted on Christine & The Queen's Facebook account, had about 6 millions views.

== Chart performance ==
In France, "Rien que de l'eau" debuted at number 45 on the chart edition of 20 June 1992, reached the top ten six weeks later, peaked at number six for a sole week in its tenth week, and totalled 19 weeks in the top 50. On the European Hot 100, it started at number 95 on 25 July 1992, reached a peak of number 37 in its seventh week and totaled 14 weeks on the chart. Regularly played on radio, it was number one for weeks on the AM National Airplay Chart.

== Track listings ==
- CD single
1. "Rien que de l'eau" — 4:29
2. "Jusqu'à la tombée du jour" — 3:47
- 7" single
1. "Rien que de l'eau" — 4:29
2. "Jusqu'à la tombée du jour" — 3:47
- Cassette
1. "Rien que de l'eau" — 4:29
2. "Jusqu'à la tombée du jour" — 3:47

== Personnel ==
- Design – Duetto Design Studio
- Producer – Bernard Saint Paul
- Recording – Peter R. Kelsey
- Design – Duetto Design Studio

== Charts ==
| Chart (1992) | Peak position |
|---|---|
| Europe (Eurochart Hot 100) | 37 |
| France (Airplay Chart [AM Stations]) | 1 |
| France (SNEP) | 6 |
| Québec (Francophone chart) | 18 |

== Release history ==
| Country | Date | Format | Label |
|---|---|---|---|
| France | 1992 | CD single | WEA |
| France | 1992 | 7" single | WEA |
| France | 1992 | Cassette | WEA |
