= Shake Me, Wake Me (When It's Over) =

1966 single by Four Tops

Single by Four Tops

from the album On Top
- B-side: "Just as Long as You Need Me"
- Released: February 1966
- Recorded: Hitsville U.S.A. (Studio A); January 6, 1966
- Genre: Soul, pop
- Length: 2:41
- Label: Motown
- Songwriters: Brian Holland; Lamont Dozier; Eddie Holland
- Producers: Brian Holland; Lamont Dozier

Four Tops singles chronology
| "Something About You" (1965) | "Shake Me, Wake Me (When It's Over)" (1966) | "Loving You Is Sweeter Than Ever" (1966) |

"Shake Me, Wake Me (When It's Over)" is a song recorded by the American quartet Four Tops for their third studio album, On Top (1966). It was released in February 1966 as a 7" vinyl single through Motown records. It was written and produced by Brian Holland, Lamont Dozier, and Eddie Holland. Its lyrics detail a relationship that has ended. It has since been regarded as one of Four Tops' most successful singles ever. It charted moderately well in both the United States and Canada, and became the group's fifth consecutive entry to chart within the top five of the Hot R&B/Hip-Hop Songs chart. Four Tops has performed "Shake Me, Wake Me (When It's Over)" on various occasions throughout their careers and have included it on several greatest hits albums, including on The Four Tops Greatest Hits (1967) and The Ultimate Collection (1997).

American musicians Barbra Streisand and Carol Lloyd also recorded covers of "Shake Me, Wake Me (When It's Over)" and released them commercially in 1975 and 1979, respectively. Included on her seventeenth studio album, Lazy Afternoon (1975), Streisand's version was more of a disco song, as accomplished by producers Jeffrey Lesser and Rupert Holmes. Following the success of the song in a New York City club, Columbia Records decided to release the single which would later become a moderate success on two Billboard dance charts in that same year. Critically, it was highlighted on Lazy Afternoon as a standout track. Lloyd's version was recorded for her debut record Score in 1979; it received heavy airplay by disc jockeys and was positively received by Billboard critics.

== Background and release ==
"Shake Me, Wake Me (When It's Over)" was released as the lead single from the group's third studio album, On Top (1966), in February 1966. The album was a combination of "current hits" and "crossover material" to attract a larger audience for Four Tops. The song was written and produced by Brian Holland, Lamont Dozier, and Eddie Holland, who had collaborated with Four Tops on various occasions in the past. It is written in the key of C major with the quartet's vocals ranging from G_{4} to D_{6}. Set in a gospel rock tempo, lead singer Levi Stubbs begins stating, "All through this long and sleepless night / I hear my neighbors talking"; after losing the love of someone else, he claims that these people are "Saying that, out of my life, into another's arms / You'll soon be walking," before entering the chorus. The American female group the Andantes provide background vocals for the track alongside the other three Tops.

Motown released "Shake Me, Wake Me (When It's Over)" as a 7" vinyl single in February 1966. The standard edition commercial single features the B-side track "Just As Long As You Need Me". A promotional early version of the 7" single also exists, with both the stereo and mono versions of the song.

== Reception ==
"Shake Me, Wake Me (When It's Over)" was favorably received by music critics. Cash Box described the single as a "hard-driving, rhythmic pop-blues heart-throbber about a guy who can’t adjust to losing his girl" that it considered "ultra-commercial." John Bush from AllMusic, in his album review of On Top, called the track one of "their biggest and best hits of all time". According to Bill Dahl, author of Motown: The Golden Years, 1966 was a successful year for Four Tops due to the success of "Shake Me, Wake Me (When It's Over)" and their others singles "Loving You Is Sweeter Than Ever" and "Reach Out I'll Be There". At the time, the single was extremely popular in Boston, where it reached #37 on the "Top Sellers in Top Markets" chart in the aforementioned city.

In the United States, it entered the Billboard Hot 100 at number 86 on February 19, 1966. After climbing the chart in that country for several weeks, it reached its peak position at number 18 on March 26; overall, it spent nine consecutive weeks in the ranks of the Billboard Hot 100. It also entered the Hot R&B/Hip-Hop Songs chart (then called simply the Hot Rhythm & Blues Singles chart) in the United States, where it peaked at number 5 and became the group's fifth consecutive top ten entry. On Canada's official singles chart, compiled by RPM, the single debuted at number 66 for the week ending March 21, 1966. The following week on March 28, the single peaked at number 52.

== Later usage ==
Four Tops has included "Shake Me, Wake Me (When It's Over)" on several of their greatest hits albums and compilation albums over the years. It was placed on their first compilation, The Four Tops Greatest Hits, in 1967, followed by The Four Tops Story 1964-72 (1973), Anthology (1974), Greatest Hits (1988), The Ultimate Collection (1997), and The Definitive Collection (2008). The group would also use the name of the track to title another album, called Shake Me, Wake Me: 25 Greatest Hits 1964-1973 in 1998.

Additionally, the group has performed the song during various occasions throughout the years. More recently, they reunited on March 3, 2017 and performed various singles from their catalog at an event at the Warner Theatre in Torrington, Connecticut. Titled IMPACT 2017, both the Temptations and Four Tops sang during the annual live dance, opera, and gala, with the Four Tops performing "Shake Me, Wake Me (When It's Over)" as the finale.

== Track listings ==
United States and Canada 7" single

- A1 "Shake Me, Wake Me (When It's Over)" – 2:41
- B1 "Just As Long As You Need Me" – 2:59

Promotional 7" single

- A1 "Shake Me, Wake Me (When It's Over) (Stereo)" – 2:41
- B1 "Shake Me, Wake Me (When It's Over) (Mono)" – 2:41

== Charts ==
Chart performance for "Shake Me, Wake Me (When It's Over)"
| Chart (1966) | Peak position |
|---|---|
| Canada Top Singles (RPM) | 52 |
| US Billboard Hot 100 | 18 |
| US Hot R&B/Hip-Hop Songs (Billboard) | 5 |

== Barbra Streisand version ==
"Shake Me, Wake Me (When It's Over)"

Single by Barbra Streisand

from the album Lazy Afternoon
- B-side: "Widescreen"
- Released: November 12, 1975
- Recorded: June 12, 1975
- Studio: Record Plant (Los Angeles, CA)
- Genre: Disco; dance; Philadelphia soul
- Length: 2:55
- Label: Columbia
- Songwriters: Brian Holland; Lamont Dozier; Eddie Holland
- Producers: Jeffrey Lesser; Rupert Holmes

Barbra Streisand singles chronology
| "My Father's Song" (1975) | "Shake Me, Wake Me (When It's Over)" (1975) | "Evergreen" (1976) |

=== Background and recording ===
American vocalist Barbra Streisand recorded her own version of "Shake Me, Wake Me (When It's Over)" for her seventeenth studio album, Lazy Afternoon (1975) in April 1975. Different from the original song, producers Jeffrey Lesser and Rupert Holmes gave the song a "disco treatment". Nicky Siano, a disc jockey, began playing the track at The Gallery nightclub in New York City in the fall of 1975. In a handwritten letter by Streisand for Siano, she wrote that the hype generated from playing her cover at the club prompted Columbia Records to release "Shake Me, Wake Me (When It's Over)" as another single from Lazy Afternoon.

In a 1979 Billboard article titled "Everyone's Jumping on Disco Bandwagon", written by columnist Paul Grein, he speculated that singers accustomed to the pop genre were beginning to "releas[e] disco records" and listed Streisand, Andy Williams, and Ethel Merman as a few examples. Following the release of the singer's disco-influenced "The Main Event/Fight" single in 1979, Grein listed both "Shake Me, Wake Me (When It's Over)" and "Love Breakdown" as Streisand's previous attempts to create dance music.

Streisand released the single in 7" and 12" vinyl formats on November 12, 1975. The United States and Canada version features B-side track "Widescreen", which also appears on Lazy Afternoon. The special edition "Columbia Disco Series" release was sent to dance clubs and features a stereo and mono version of "Shake Me, Wake Me (When It's Over)". A promotional release also took place that offered the short and long versions of the track, while the United Kingdom version (which was released on February 20, 1976) is similar to the United States/Canada one but contains the longer cut of the single instead of the album version.

=== Reception ===
Critics liked Streisand's version of the track. Christopher Nickens and Karen Swenson, authors of The Films of Barbra Streisand, listed both "Shake Me, Wake Me (When It's Over)" and "Moanin' Low" from Lazy Afternoon as two of the best songs from Streisand's entire career in 2000. Writer Will Hermes was also positive towards it, calling it a "surprisingly soulful cover". Derek Winnert, who wrote a biography on the singer in 1996, claimed that because of songs like "Shake Me, Wake Me (When It's Over)" and album track "By the Way", the parent album was able to be appealing and thus a popular record. The author of True Colours: A Spectrum of Filipino Gay and Lesbian Online Writings, Nelz Agustin, felt that Streisand's cover was nostalgic and brought him back to the days of his youth. The success of "Shake Me, Wake Me (When It's Over)" allowed it to enter two of the dance charts compiled by Billboard: it peaked at number 14 on the Dance Club Songs chart and number 10 on the now-defunct Disco Singles chart.

=== Track listings and formats ===
United States and Canada 7" single

- A1 "Shake Me, Wake Me (When It's Over)" – 2:52
- B1 "Widescreen" – 3:59

Columbia Disco Series 12" single

- A1 "Shake Me, Wake Me (When It's Over) (Stereo)" – 4:55
- B1 "Shake Me, Wake Me (When It's Over) (Mono)" – 4:55

Promotional 7" single

- A1 "Shake Me, Wake Me (When It's Over) (Short Version)" – 2:52
- B1 "Shake Me, Wake Me (When It's Over) (Long Version)" – 4:55

United Kingdom 7" single

- A1 "Shake Me, Wake Me (When It's Over) (Long Version)" – 4:55
- B1 "Widescreen" – 3:59

=== Charts ===
Chart performance for "Shake Me, Wake Me (When It's Over)"
| Chart (1975) | Peak position |
|---|---|
| US Dance Club Songs (Billboard) | 14 |
| US Disco Singles (Billboard) | 10 |

== Carol Lloyd version ==
"Shake Me, Wake Me"

Single by Carol Lloyd

from the album Score
- B-side: "Sundown to Sunrise"
- Released: December 1979
- Genre: Disco; soul
- Length: 2:58
- Label: Casablanca; Earmarc
- Songwriters: Brian Holland; Lamont Dozier; Eddie Holland
- Producers: Michael Forte; Bruce Weeden

Carol Lloyd singles chronology
| "Score" (1979) | "Shake Me, Wake Me" (1979) | "Come See About Me" (1982) |

=== Background ===
American singer Carol Lloyd also covered "Shake Me, Wake Me (When It's Over)" (although she removed the "(When It's Over)" part from the title) and released it in December 1979. It served as the second and final single from her debut studio album, Score (1979); both Casablanca Records and Earmarc Records handled the 7" commercial releases. It was previously used as the B-side for her debut single, "Score", in September 1979.

On Billboard's Top Single Picks for the week of December 22, 1979, the editors listed Lloyd's version as a recommended track under the soul music category. In a review from the same publication, editor Barry Lederer called it the "one exceptional cut" on Score. Classifying it as a disco recording, he also found Lloyd's extended version of "Shake Me, Wake Me" to "make th[e] already popular Streisand classic ever better". The standard edition version, released exclusively in the United States, contained the single and B-side track "Sundown to Sunrise" while the promotional DJ single featured the stereo and mono versions of "Shake Me, Wake Me". It peaked at number 89 on Billboard's Dance Club Songs chart on January 5, 1980.

=== Track listings ===
United States 7" single

- A1 "Shake Me, Wake Me" – 2:58
- B1 "Sundown to Sunrise" – 2:59

Promotional 7" single

- A1 "Shake Me, Wake Me (Stereo)" – 2:58
- B1 "Shake Me, Wake Me (Mono)" – 2:58

=== Charts ===
Chart performance for "Shake Me, Wake Me"
| Chart (1980) | Peak position |
|---|---|
| US Dance Club Songs (Billboard) | 89 |
