= Kiki Dee =

British singer (born 1947)

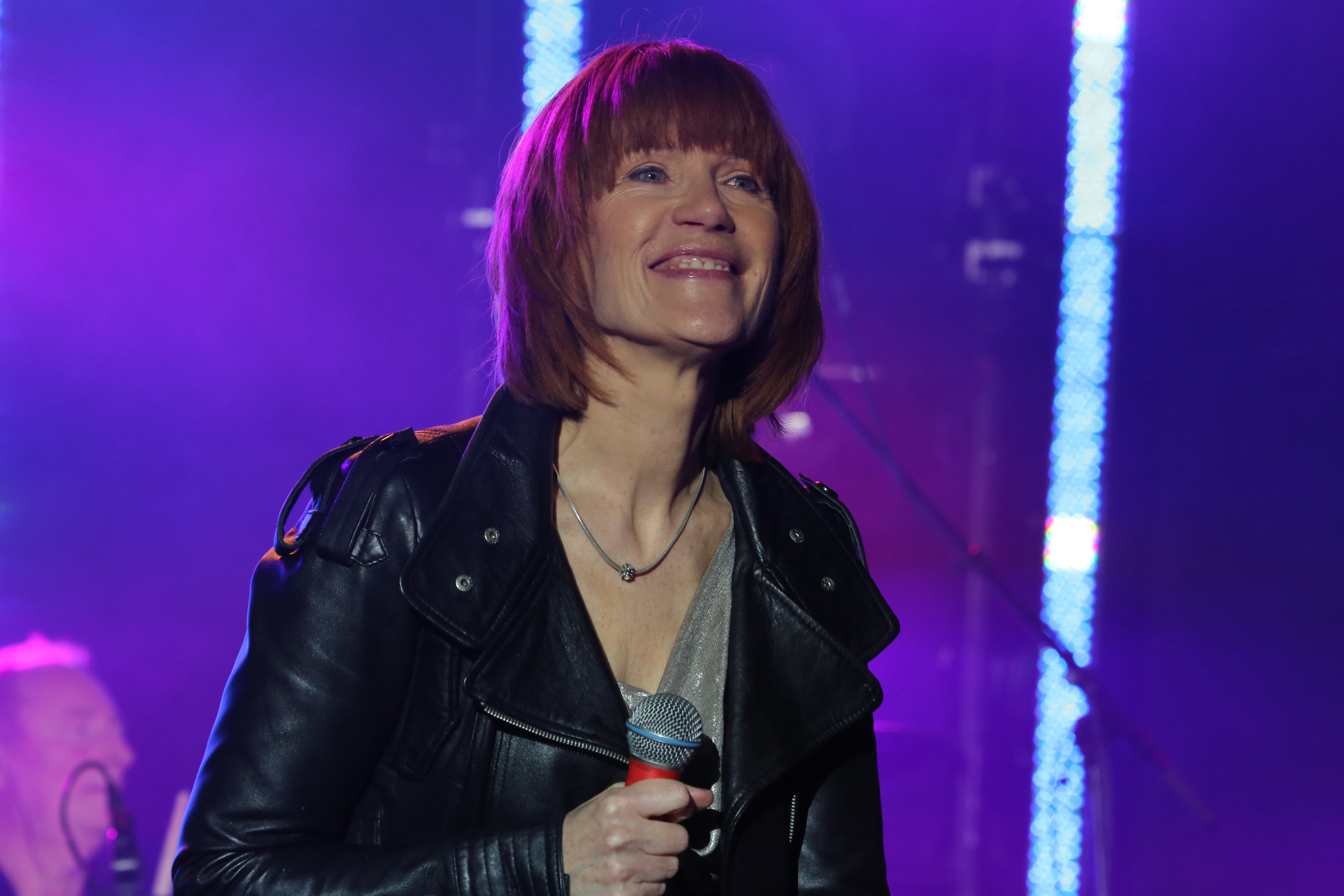
- Dee in 2013

Background information
- Born: Pauline Matthews; 6 March 1947 (age 79); Bradford, West Riding of Yorkshire, England
- Genres: Blue-eyed soul; pop
- Occupation: Singer
- Instrument: Vocals
- Years active: 1960–present
- Labels: Fontana; Tamla Motown; Rocket; Columbia/EMI; Columbia (Sony)
- Website: www.kikiandcarmelo.com

Pauline Matthews (born 6 March 1947), better known by her stage name Kiki Dee, is an English singer. Known for her blue-eyed soul vocals, she was the first female singer from the UK to sign with Motown's Tamla Records.

Dee is best known for the hit singles "Amoureuse" (1973), "I've Got the Music in Me" (1974) and "Don't Go Breaking My Heart", her 1976 duet with Elton John, which reached number one on the UK singles chart and the US Billboard Hot 100 chart. Her 1981 single "Star" became the theme song for the talent show Opportunity Knocks when it was revived by the BBC in 1987. In 1993, she performed another duet with John for his Duets album, a cover version of Cole Porter's "True Love", which reached number two in the UK. During her career, she has released 40 singles, three EPs and 12 albums.

== Early life, family and education ==
Dee was born in Bradford, West Riding of Yorkshire, England. "I realised when I sang at family parties and Christmases I'd suddenly get everyone's attention and, being the youngest of three, I thought what a brilliant attention-seeking ploy it was", stated Dee in a 2013 interview. She added: "My older brother had a lot of Elvis on vinyl and really that was my first introduction to music during the Fifties."

== Career ==
=== Musician ===
After singing with a local band in Bradford in the early 1960s, Dee began her recording career as a session singer. She sang backing vocals for Dusty Springfield, among others, but did not achieve solo success in the UK for many years. In 1963, Dee released her first single, "Early Night", the first of eleven singles on Fontana, none of which reached the charts. Her 1966 release "Why Don't I Run Away From You" (a cover of Tami Lynn's "I'm Gonna Run Away From You") was a big hit on Radio London and Radio Caroline, and she sang the B-side "Small Town" in her appearance in Dateline Diamonds the same year. Also in 1966, she achieved wider coverage by singing "Take a Look at Me" in the hit comedy, Doctor in Clover. She brought out an EP, Kiki In Clover – which included "Take a Look at Me" – at the same time as the film's release. She was one of the backing vocalists on Love Affair's 1968 UK number one single Everlasting Love.

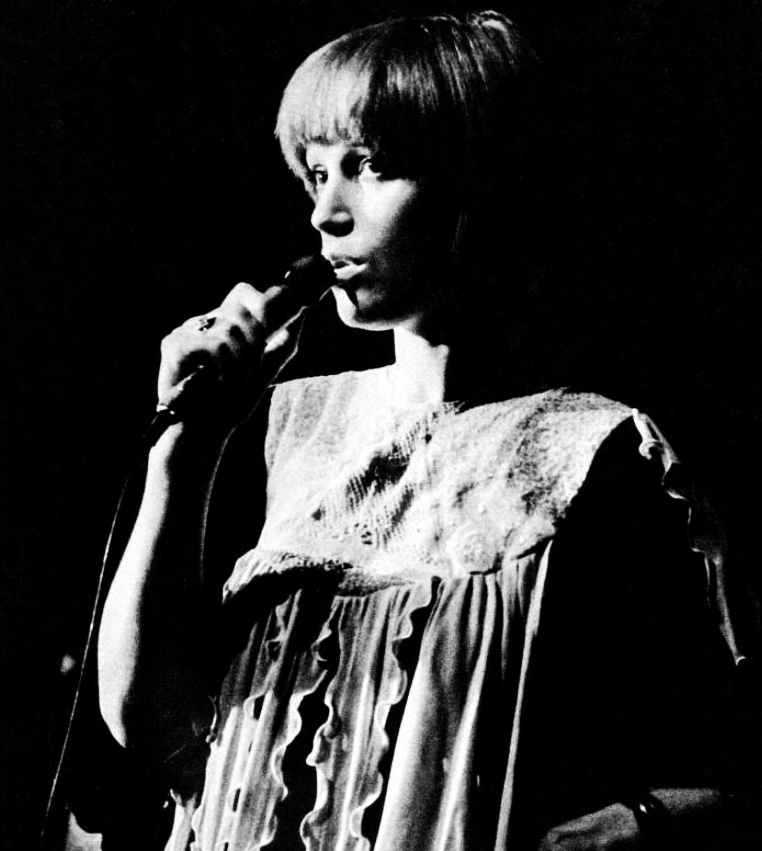
Dee in 1974

She recorded her debut album, I'm Kiki Dee, in 1968 which included a series of Phil Spector-style tracks and covers. Her 1968 release "On a Magic Carpet Ride", which was originally a B-side, has remained popular on the northern soul circuit. Much of her early recorded work for Fontana Records, was released on 24 January 2011, on the CD compilation I'm Kiki Dee.

Songwriter Mitch Murray created her stage name, and penned her first single, "Early Night". In the United States she became the first white British artist to be signed by Motown, releasing her first Motown single in 1970. Her Motown recordings were later compiled on the album Love Makes the World Go Round (2005).

In the days before BBC Radio 1, Dee was a regular performer of cover versions on BBC Radio, and she starred with a group of session singers in the BBC Two singalong series, One More Time. She also appeared in an early episode of The Benny Hill Show in January 1971, performing the Blood, Sweat and Tears hit, "You've Made Me So Very Happy". Nevertheless, it was only after she signed with Elton John's label, Rocket, that she became a household name in the UK. Her first major solo hits were "Amoureuse" (written by Véronique Sanson, with English lyrics by Gary Osborne) (1973) and "I've Got the Music in Me" (written by Bias Boshell), the latter credited to the Kiki Dee Band (1974). In addition to her burgeoning career as a lead vocalist, she could sometimes be heard singing backing vocals on various John recordings, such as "All the Girls Love Alice" from Goodbye Yellow Brick Road and various tracks on Rock of the Westies.

Dee's biggest hit came in 1976, a duet with John, "Don't Go Breaking My Heart" (pseudonymously written by John and lyricist Bernie Taupin). The single reached number one in both the UK and US, remaining at the top for six weeks in the UK. At the end of the summer, she played as support act to Queen at their Hyde Park concert in front of a crowd of 150,000 people. Prior to the concert, in an interview for Record Mirror, she stated, "My confidence is at an all-time high."

After a quiet period in the late 1970s, Dee launched a comeback in 1981, releasing one of her biggest hits, "Star", written by Doreen Chanter of the Chanter Sisters. This later became the theme music to the BBC1 programme Opportunity Knocks between 1987 and 1990. Dee joined forces again with John in 1981, recording a cover of the Four Tops' song "Loving You Is Sweeter Than Ever" which was written by Ivy Jo Hunter and Stevie Wonder. Both of these were included on her album Perfect Timing, which became a modest hit on the album chart, and she supplied backing vocals for John's 1983 album Too Low for Zero. Dee also sang the song "What Can't Speak Can't Lie" (1983), composed and recorded by the Japanese jazz fusion group Casiopea, and with lyrics by Gary Osborne.

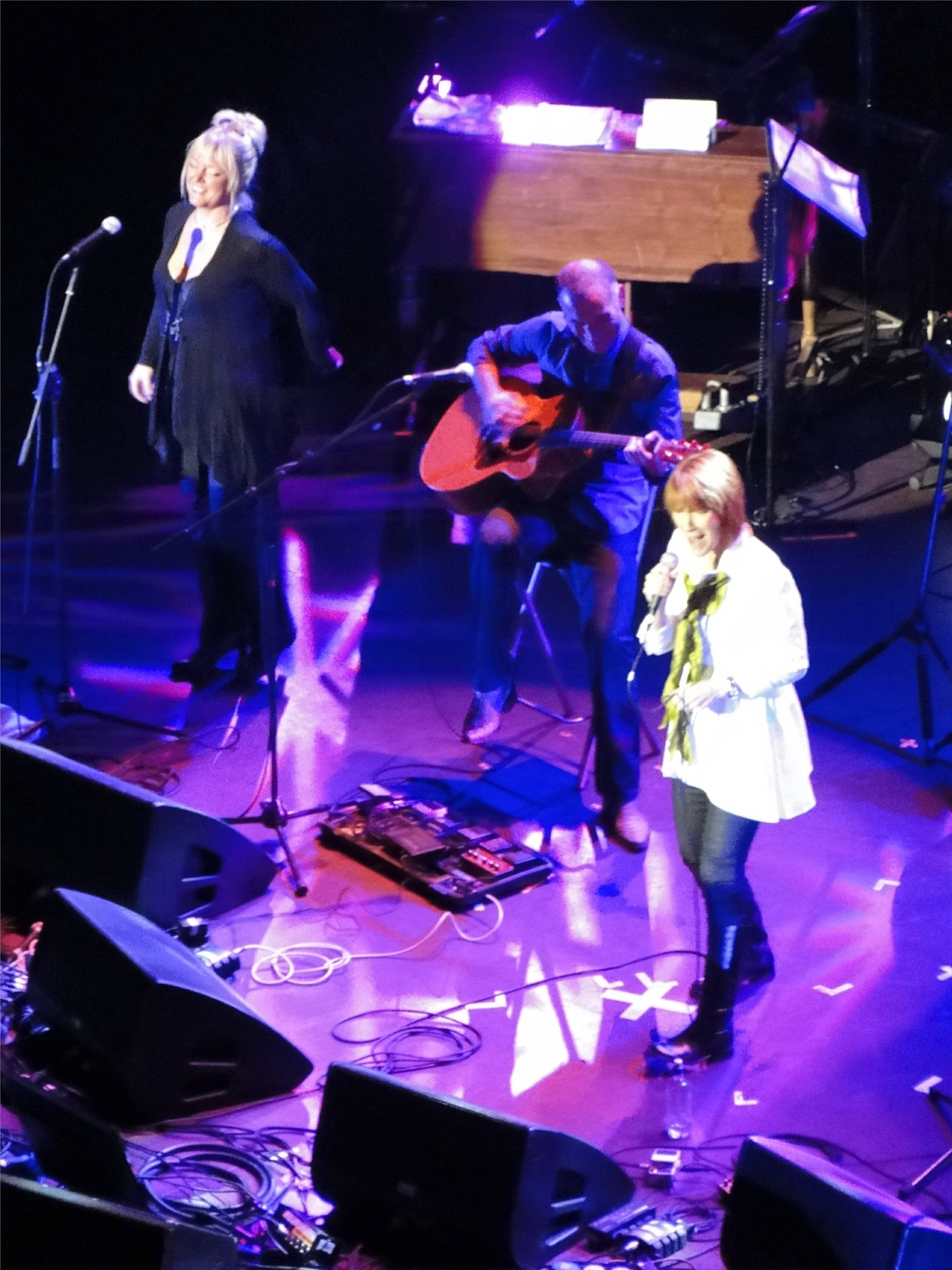
Dee (right), performing with Luggeri, at London's Royal Albert Hall, October 2009, in aid of the PRS for Music

She performed at Live Aid in 1985, reprising "Don't Go Breaking My Heart" with John, and performing backing vocals on the other songs in his set. After signing to Columbia, Dee released the album Angel Eyes in 1987. She contributed backing vocals to Elton John's 1992 album The One, and a year later recorded "True Love" with John for his 1993 album Duets.

Dee released the live album Almost Naked, a joint effort with Carmelo Luggeri in 1995, followed by the studio albums Where Rivers Meet (1998) and The Walk Of Faith (2005) with Luggeri. In September 2013, Dee and Luggeri released their third studio album, A Place Where I Can Go, on Spellbound Records. They have been touring together ever since and have played alongside Roger Taylor, Jack Bruce, Fish, Paul Young, Tom Robinson, Graham Gouldman and Madeline Bell.

In October 2009 she performed, with Luggeri, at London's Royal Albert Hall, in aid of the PRS for Music (formerly the Performing Right Society) for Music Members' Benevolent Fund.

Dee's single "Sidesteppin' with a Soul Man", released in October 2013, was her 40th single release.

Dee and Luggeri's album Long Ride Home was released in April 2022. In November that year Dee joined Elton John on stage to sing "Don't Go Breaking My Heart" again for the final US show of his Farewell Yellow Brick Road tour at Dodger Stadium in Los Angeles.

=== Musical theatre ===
Dee has appeared in musical theatre, including a leading role in Willy Russell's West End musical Blood Brothers, in which she took on the role originally played by Barbara Dickson for the 1988 production and recording. She received an Olivier Award nomination in 1989 in the Best Actress in a Musical category. In 1990, she contributed to the last recording studio collaboration between Alan Parsons and Eric Woolfson, on the album Freudiana, performing "You're On Your Own" and part of "No One Can Love You Better Than Me".

In 2008, Dee's first DVD was released. Under The Night Sky was a collaboration with guitarist Carmelo Luggeri, filmed live at the Bray Studios in London; the music was produced by Ted Carfrae. That same year, several albums from her earlier 1970s–1980s Rocket catalogue were re-released by EMI Records, including an expanded edition of Almost Naked with extra tracks, such as a cover of Neil Young's "Heart of Gold" and a new take on "Sugar on the Floor". The same year, Demon Records (UK) issued a remastered edition of Perfect Timing, with several bonus tracks, including an alternate mix of "Loving You Is Sweeter Than Ever".

Dee had previously starred in Pump Boys and Dinettes in London's West End, at the Piccadilly Theatre, from 20 September 1984 to 8 June 1985.

== Personal life ==
In her forties, Dee was diagnosed with uterine cancer. As of 2024, she has never married and has no children.

== Discography ==
Kiki Dee has released 40 singles, three EPs and 22 albums.

=== Albums ===
Release date	Title	UK	AUS	Label
1968	I'm Kiki Dee	–	–	Fontana
1969	Patterns (US top-price release)	–	–	Liberty
1970	Great Expectations	–	–	Tamla Motown
1973	Loving & Free	–	38	Rocket
1974	I've Got the Music in Me	–	–	Rocket
1974	Patterns (UK mid-price release)	–	–	Philips
1974	Kiki Dee	–	–	MFP/Sound Superb
1977	Kiki Dee	24	–	Rocket
1979	Stay with Me	–	–	Rocket
1980	Greatest Hits	–	–	Warwick
1981	Perfect Timing	47	–	Ariola
1987	Angel Eyes	–	–	Columbia (UK)
1991	Spotlight On Kiki Dee – Greatest Hits	–	–	Rocket
1994	The Very Best of Kiki Dee	62	–	Rocket
1995	Almost Naked	–	–	Tickety-boo
1998	Where Rivers Meet	–	–	Tickety-boo
2005	Love Makes the World Go Round – The Motown Years	–	–	Universal
2005	The Walk of Faith	–	–	Spellbound
2008	Cage the Songbird	–	–	EMI
2009	The Best of Kiki Dee	–	–	EMI
2013	A Place Where I Can Go	–	–	Spellbound
2019	Gold	44	–	Crimson
2022	Long Ride Home	–	–	Spellbound Recordings

=== Singles ===
Release date	Single title	UK	AUS	US	Label
1963	"Early Night"	–	–	–	Fontana
1963	"I Was Only Kidding"	–	–	–	Fontana
1964	"Miracles"	–	–	–	Fontana
1964	"(You Don't Know) How Glad I Am"	–	–	–	Fontana
1965	"Runnin' Out of Fools"	–	–	–	Fontana
1966	"Why Don't I Run Away from You"	–	–	–	Fontana
1967	"I'm Going Out (The Same Way I Came In)"	–	–	–	Fontana
1967	"I"	–	–	–	Fontana
1967	"Excuse Me"	–	–	–	Fontana
1968	"Can't Take My Eyes off You"	–	–	–	Fontana
1968	"Now the Flowers Cry"	–	–	–	Fontana
1970	"The Day Will Come Between Sunday and Monday"	–	–	–	Tamla Motown
1971	"Love Makes the World Go Round"	–	–	87	Rare Earth (Motown)
1973	"Lonnie and Josie"	–	–	–	Rocket
1973	"Amoureuse"	13	12	–	Rocket
1974	"Hard Luck Story"	–	–	–	Rocket
1974	"I've Got the Music in Me"	19	52	12	Rocket
1975	"(You Don't Know) How Glad I Am"	33	–	74	Rocket
1975	"Once a Fool"	–	–	82	Rocket
1976	"Don't Go Breaking My Heart" (with Elton John)	1	1	1	Rocket
1976	"Loving and Free" / "Amoureuse" (Kiki Dee EP)	13	–	–	Rocket
1977	"First Thing in the Morning"	32	–	–	Rocket
1977	"Night Hours"	–	–	–	Rocket
1977	"Chicago"	28	–	–	Rocket
1978	"Stay With Me Baby"	–	–	–	Rocket
1979	"One Jump Ahead of the Storm"	–	–	–	Rocket
1981	"Star"	13	64	–	Ariola
1981	"Perfect Timing"	66	–	–	Ariola
1981	"Midnight Flyer"	–	–	–	Ariola
1981	"Loving You Is Sweeter Than Ever" (with Elton John)	–	–	–	Ariola
1983	"The Loser Gets to Win"	105	99	–	EMI
1984	"Amoureuse"	77	–	–	Rocket
1986	"Another Day Comes (Another Day Goes)"	117	–	–	Columbia (US)
1987	"I Fall in Love Too Easily"	–	–	–	Columbia (US)
1987	"Stay Close to You"	–	–	–	Columbia (US)
1987	"Angel Eyes"	–	–	–	Columbia (US)
1993	"True Love" (with Elton John)	2	–	56	Rocket

=== DVDs ===
- 2008 – Under the Night Sky Live (with Carmelo Luggeri) – New Wave Pictures (produced by Ted Carfrae)

== In media ==
Dee was portrayed by actress Rachel Muldoon in the 2019 Elton John biopic Rocketman.
