= Patti Dahlstrom =

American singer-songwriter

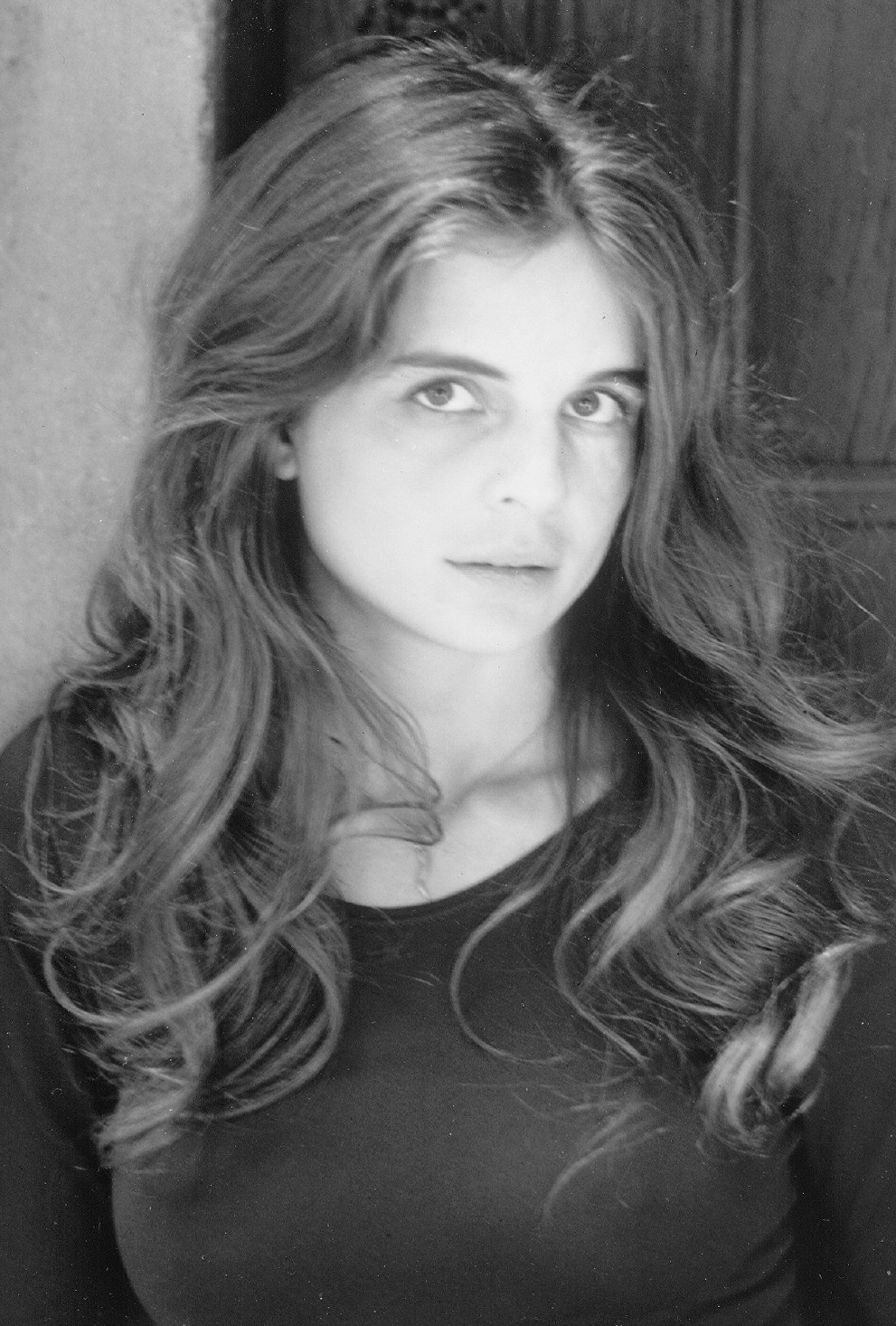

Background information
- Born: Patricia Cornelia Dahlstrom; March 24, 1947 (age 79); Houston, Texas, U.S.
- Genres: Pop, rock
- Occupations: Singer, songwriter, teacher
- Years active: 1970–present
- Labels: Uni, 20th Century
- Website: pattidahlstrom.com

Patti Dahlstrom is a singer, songwriter, and teacher. She recorded four albums in the 1970s and co-wrote the Helen Reddy hit "Emotion".

== Career ==
One of five children, Dahlstrom was born in Houston, Texas. She began writing songs before her teen years and dreamed of becoming a songwriter while reading the credits on album sleeves. In 1967, she moved to Los Angeles to pursue a career in music. After three years she signed a contract with Jobete Music, a division of Motown, and was mentored by Berry Gordy. She began a songwriting relationship with Severin Browne, the brother of Jackson Browne. Her first album was released by Uni Records, while the next three were released by 20th Century Records. She wrote "Sending My Good Thoughts to You" with Artie Wayne and dedicated it to her friend Jim Croce, who died in a plane crash in 1973.

Her songs were recorded by Anne Murray ("Ain't No Way to Rise Above"), Cilla Black ("Running Out of World"), Helen Reddy ("Emotion"), Thelma Houston ("What If", "I'm Letting Go" and "I Never Did"), Michael Johnson ("Dialogue"), Captain & Tennille ("Feels Like More Than Dancing") Johnny Rivers ("Over the Line"), and Riders in the Sky ("Even Texas Isn't Big Enough Now"). Reddy's version of "Emotion" reached No. 1 on the Billboard Easy Listening chart. Miss Dahlstrom wrote a new English lyric for Warner Brothers to the music of "Amoureuse" by Véronique Sanson.

Dahlstrom stopped recording music in the 1970s, citing exhaustion as the reason. Years later in an interview, Russ Regan said he was surprised that her albums hadn't been more popular. During the 1980s, she continued to write songs and learn photography. Returning to Texas in 1990, she taught songwriting at The Art Institute of Houston and became director of the department. In 2008 she moved to London to pursue a master's degree in writing. Four years later she moved to San José del Cabo, Mexico, and currently resides in Texas. A compilation of her music from the 1970s was released in 2010.

== Discography ==
- Patti Dahlstrom (Uni, 1972)
- The Way I Am (20th Century, 1973)
- Your Place or Mine (20th Century, 1975)
- Livin' It Thru (20th Century, 1976)
- Emotion: The Music of Patti Dahlstrom (RevOla, UK, 2010)
