= Yesterday's Dreams (Four Tops album) =

Studio album by The Four Tops
- Released: September 1968
- Studio: Hitsville U.S.A., Detroit
- Length: 38:01
- Label: Motown
- Producer: Ivy Jo Hunter, Ashford & Simpson, Frank Wilson

The Four Tops chronology
The Four Tops Greatest Hits (1967)	Yesterday's Dreams (1968)	Four Tops Now! (1969)

Singles from Yesterday's Dreams
- 1. "Yesterday's Dreams" Released: June 27, 1968; 2. "I'm in a Different World" Released: September 19, 1968

Professional ratings
Review scores
Source	Rating
Allmusic	3/5 stars

Yesterday's Dreams is the seventh overall and sixth studio album recorded by the Four Tops, issued by Motown Records in August 1968. The album was recorded as the main Motown songwriting/producing partnership of Holland–Dozier–Holland were leaving the label, and as a result only contains one song from them, "I'm in a Different World", which was released as a single.

There are several other original Motown songs on the album, including the title track, "Remember When", "We've Got a Strong Love (On Our Side)", "Can't Seem to Get You Out of My Mind" and a cover of Stevie Wonder's "A Place in the Sun". The rest are cover songs produced by Ivy Jo Hunter and Frank Wilson.

== Track listing ==
No.	Title	Writer(s)	Length
1.	"Yesterday's Dreams"	Vernon Bullock, Jack Alan Goga, Ivy Jo Hunter, Pam Sawyer	2:59
2.	"Can't Seem to Get You out of My Mind"	Nickolas Ashford, Valerie Simpson	3:24
3.	"I'm in a Different World"	Holland–Dozier–Holland	3:02
4.	"We've Got a Strong Love (On Our Side)"	Jack Alan Goga, Ivy Jo Hunter, Pam Sawyer	3:10
5.	"By the Time I Get to Phoenix"	Jimmy Webb	3:10
6.	"Remember When"	Shena DeMell, Jack Alan Goga, Ivy Jo Hunter	3:11
7.	"Sunny"	Bobby Hebb	3:29
8.	"Never My Love"	Don Addrisi, Dick Addrisi	3:27
9.	"Daydream Believer"	John Stewart	3:16
10.	"Once Upon a Time"	Lee Adams, Charles Strouse	2:28
11.	"The Sweetheart Tree"	Henry Mancini, Johnny Mercer	3:00
12.	"A Place in the Sun"	Ron Miller, Bryan Wells	3:25

== Personnel ==
- Levi Stubbs – lead baritone vocals
- Lawrence Payton – second tenor backing vocals, keyboards
- Renaldo "Obie" Benson – bass backing vocals
- Abdul "Duke" Fakir – first tenor backing vocals
- The Andantes – additional background vocals (tracks 2–5, 7–11)
- The Originals – additional background vocals (tracks 2 and 11)
- Instrumentation by The Funk Brothers
