= Véronique Sanson =

French singer-songwriter

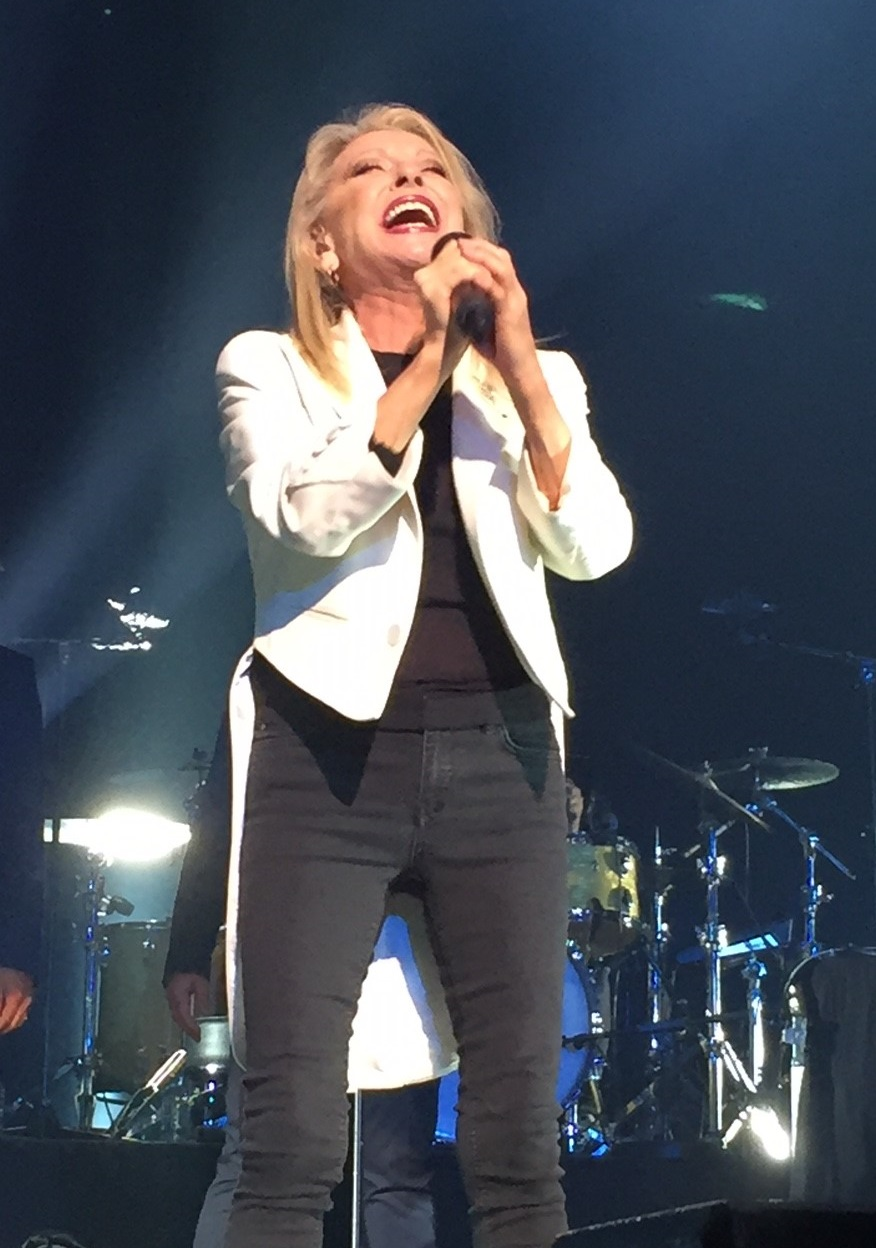
- Sanson in 2018

Background information
- Born: Véronique Marie Line Sanson; 24 April 1949 (age 77)
- Origin: Boulogne-Billancourt, Île-de-France, France
- Genres: Chanson; French pop; pop rock
- Occupations: Singer-songwriter; record producer
- Instruments: Piano; guitar
- Years active: 1967–present
- Labels: Elektra/Warner Music Group (1972–2015); Sony Music (2015–present)
- Website: veronique-sanson.net

Véronique Marie Line Sanson (French pronunciation: [veʁɔnik maʁi lin sɑ̃sɔ̃]; born 24 April 1949) is a French singer-songwriter and record producer with an avid following in her native country.

Ten years after Barbara, Véronique Sanson became one of the first French female singer-songwriters to break into stardom with her debut album "Amoureuse" in 1972. She also became one of the most successful and most prominent members of the Seventies "Nouvelle chanson française" ("New French chanson"), alongside Alain Souchon, Bernard Lavilliers, Jacques Higelin, Michel Polnareff, Catherine Lara, Yves Duteil, Maxime Le Forestier, Renaud, William Sheller, Michel Jonasz, Michel Berger, Hubert-Félix Thiéfaine, Louis Chédid, or Francis Cabrel. Unlike most previous French artists of the Sixties Yé-yé era, who mostly released EPs consisting of a collection of singles, B-sides and covers, Sanson and her counterparts of the "nouvelle chanson française" established the dominance of singer-songwriters on the Seventies French charts thanks to albums with full-length artistic statements.

One of her songs, "Amoureuse", was covered in English in 1973 by singer Kiki Dee, and became a major hit in the United Kingdom, and has been covered since by various other singers, from Polly Brown (1973) to Elaine Paige with Olivia Newton-John (1974), Pete Townshend (1974), Linda Martin (1996) and Amanda Abbs with Illusive (1997). In 1974, Patti Dahlstrom recorded a second version with her own lyrics, entitled "Emotion", which was covered by Helen Reddy (1974) and Shirley Bassey (1975). Many other covers of "Amoureuse" have been recorded in French, German, Spanish, Dutch or Japanese.

Sanson plays piano and guitar.

== Childhood and family ==
Both her parents, René and Colette Sanson, were members of the Resistance during the German occupation of France. Before the war, René Sanson was a French diplomat in The Hague. When the Germans invaded the Netherlands, he sent a coded message to warn the French government that Germany was planning to attack France from across the Belgian border. This very message was decoded by Colette, a communication worker at the French Ministry of War. It was not until a few months later that they met in person, in a resistance cell. Both became prominent within the Resistance. In 1944, after the bombing of a German train, Colette was arrested and sentenced to death by the occupation force but managed to escape.

After the liberation of Paris, René Sanson was appointed Minister of Labour in Charles de Gaulle's provisional government. The couple married in 1945. As a lawyer and an economist, René Sanson remained involved in politics as Member of Parliament and Deputy of the 13th district of Paris until 1967. In 1970, he was in charge of the French delegation at the Osaka World Expo; Véronique first visited Japan on this occasion.

Véronique grew up in a very privileged Parisian home. She attended the Cours Hattemer, a private school. Her parents considered music the finest art there was, and emphasized the musical apprenticeship of their daughters. Her mother introduced her to the guitar, while her father, who was a great fan of jazz, taught her the piano at the age of four. At the age of 13, she already composed her own songs, influenced by The Beatles, Ray Charles and by Dionne Warwick's peculiar vibrato. In 1965, she was struck by amnesia after a severe bout of meningitis that left her with few and fragmented childhood memories.

== Discovery and early recordings: the late 1960s ==
In 1967, her career began in a trio, the Roche-Martin, with François Bernheim and her sister Violaine Sanson. The three teenagers only managed to sell a few hundred records, but this experience allowed her to meet with Michel Berger, with whom she began a romantic relationship as well as a prolific artistic career. He introduced her to his record company (Pathé Marconi), and encouraged her to pursue a solo career. Sanson later mentioned that period as her most productive. In an interview, she recalled that she forced herself to write a song per day to keep up with Berger, who commissioned her to write songs for Isabelle de Funès, niece of French actor, Louis de Funès. She wrote "Mon voisin", "Une odeur de neige" and "Jusqu'à la tombée du jour" that would later be featured in Sanson's 1992 album Sans Regrets. In 1969, she released her first solo single, comprising "Le Feu Du Ciel" and "Le Printemps est là", which met with very little success.

== The Breakthrough: the early 1970s ==
After the commercial failure of her first single, her contract with Pathé Marconi was severed. In 1971, she wrote "La brume de Philadelphie" for Petula Clark, which was issued as the B-side of Clark's French single "La Chanson de Marie Madeleine".

She and Berger had formed an inseparable team, and were offered a joint recording contract by Bernard de Bosson, CEO of WEA at the time.

In 1972, Sanson released the album Amoureuse, produced by Berger, which received a warm welcome from critics. With the singles "Besoin de personne", "Amoureuse", and "Bahia", it reached the summit of the charts thanks to intensive radio play (2× Gold in five months). Françoise Hardy later declared that the release of Amoureuse marked the end of the Yé-yé era, as she confessed "When I first heard Amoureuse, I had the impression that every female singer, including myself, was left far behind". However, the success of the album had an ironic downside for Sanson, who was terrified of performing in front of an audience and therefore refused to schedule concerts. However, Berger and de Bosson believed she could overcome her debilitating fear, and forced her to perform a daily showcase at the Eiffel Tower's restaurant. She also appeared the same year as the opening act for some of the biggest stars of the time such as Claude Francois, Julien Clerc, and Michel Polnareff.

Amoureuse was closely followed by De l'autre côté de mon rêve, which also became a commercial success thanks to the singles "Comme je l'imagine", and "Chanson sur ma drôle de vie". In the meantime, she had met Stephen Stills after a concert he performed with his new band Manassas in Paris. They fell in love, and Sanson left Berger to follow Stills to New York, just as De l'autre côté de mon rêve was released – she supposedly went out to buy cigarettes, but never came back. In 1973, Sanson went on tour as a main act for the first time in Canada.

== The American Period: 1973–1981 ==
Sanson and Stills married in 1973, in Guildford, England, with guests including Ringo Starr and Roger Daltrey. She moved permanently to the United States, but returned to France regularly to give concerts and promote her music. In 1974, she gave birth to her only child, Christopher, in Boulder, Colorado. Her marriage also marked a new direction to her career, which has led the French media to constantly associate her music with Anglophone influences (in her career she has recorded most of her albums in the US, and mostly with American musicians).

She enrolled Manassas and decided to produce her next album herself. In contrast with her Beatles-inspired previous albums, the record emerged as a mixture of pop and 1970's rock and roll. Critically acclaimed at the time and still viewed today as a milestone of Sanson's career, Le Maudit was released in 1974, and reflects a large spectrum of musical influences such as bossa nova in "Alia Souza", or pure rock'n'roll in "On m'attend là bas". After several tours in Quebec in 1973, she went touring in France, with two concerts at the Olympia in October 1974, with Stills on bass guitar, then a long tour in 1975, with two weeks at the Olympia.

In 1976, she began a long-lasting professional collaboration with producer Bernard Saint-Paul – making 12 albums – and released the album Vancouver, recorded in London with British musicians. The record became her first platinum album, propelled by the single "Vancouver", one of her biggest hits.

By 1976, Sanson had become an established star. Her music, very much inspired by the best American producers, was a rarity in the Seventies French musical landscape. She gave two weeks of concerts at the Olympia, where her first live album was recorded.

The following year she released Hollywood, her fifth studio album. Recorded in Stevie Wonder's studios in Los Angeles, Hollywood found Sanson combining a disco-inspired sound to pop-driven melodies, which led the album to be referred to as the most representative piece of Sanson's American period. The same year she went on tour across France with Michel Jonasz as her opening act. Although she lived in the United States most of the time, she managed to remain present in the French musical landscape, travelling back and forth between her home in Colorado and her audience in France.

In 1978, she became the first French female artist to perform at le Palais des sports in Paris, which was the biggest arena in Paris at that time.

In 1979, she released 7ème, best known for the single "Ma révérence", one of her most popular songs. Overall, the album is quite melancholic, which contrasts with the lightness of Hollywood two years earlier. In fact, Sanson was going through a hard time in her life. She had decided to leave Stills and was engaged in a tough legal battle in American courts for the custody of her son.

== Period of Transition: The 1980s ==
The transition toward the 1980s was difficult and challenging. Still tied to America by her son, of whom she did not gain full custody until 1983, she continued to split her time between the US and France. Fans and critics were enthusiastic when her new album came out in 1981 (Laisse-la vivre). Though the record contained no memorable hit singles, it emerged as a solid ensemble of well-crafted songs. The album went double gold and she spent the following year on the road, managing to draw large audiences during a tour that ended with three weeks in a row at the le Palais des sports of Paris.

In 1983, she permanently settled in France with her son, Christopher, and her boyfriend, actor Etienne Chicot. After a long break, she released an eponymous album in 1985, recorded entirely in France. This untitled album was nicknamed The white album by the press, while Sanson refers to it as The lil' trees (Les p'tits arbres). This synth-driven album included C'est long c'est court which became a radio hit in France during the summer of 1985, as well as the ballad "Le temps est assassin". She then embarked in a long tour during 1985–86 which met with tremendous success highlighted by a month-long residence at the Olympia in November 1985.

In 1988, she released the album Moi le venin, which included the highly controversial single "Allah" (produced by Michel Berger). A couple of months after the release of the video directed by Dominic Sena (director of Gone in 60 Seconds, Kalifornia, Swordfish...), the song was censored in the media, and Sanson was forced to drop it from her tour's set-list after receiving threats of violence from radical Muslims. As a result of several death threats, she was put under police protection. The controversy arose because of the Muslim tradition forbidding reference to Allah in a song, and occurred just a few weeks after a fatwā was issued against Salman Rushdie. In response to the uproar, Sanson apologized and pleaded that the song was really meant to be a message of peace and tolerance. French show-business massively stood up for her, and more than a hundred artists signed a pamphlet against "the diktat of all forms of radicalism"

In November 1989, Sanson took part in the first charity tour entitled Les Enfoirés for Les Restos du coeur, alongside French rock stars Johnny Hallyday, Eddy Mitchell and Jean-Jacques Goldman.

In 1989, she realized a lifelong dream to play with a symphonic orchestra. After rehearsals in Czechoslovakia with the Czech symphonic orchestra "Fisyo", a series of six concerts took place in December 1989 at the Théâtre du Châtelet in Paris. A resulting live album was released the subsequent year. In 1990, she also toured with the symphonic orchestra for a dozen concerts across France.

== The 1990s ==
In 1991, Véronique Sanson received the Grand Prix of "la SACEM" (the French Singer Songwriter guild) to celebrate her entire recording career. The same year, she released a duet with singer-songwriter Catherine Lara, entitled "Entre elle et moi".

For the first time in more than a decade, Sanson recorded her tenth studio album in the US with American musicians. Sans regrets, issued in 1992, was a tremendous success propelled by the famous single "Rien que de l'eau". This song was the result of an unprecedented collaboration with another songwriter, Bernard Swell, a long-time friend. The album went platinum and its first single still remains one of her biggest hits, with over 500,000 copies sold in six months.

In 1993, she won a Victoires de la musique for best female singer of the year. In March, she performed at the Zenith Paris. During these shows, she paid tribute to Berger who had died in 1992, by performing "Seras-tu là", one of his songs. The live album recorded at the Zenith went platinum.

Between 1993 and 1996, Sanson went on tour in France, Belgium, Switzerland and Canada. During the summer of 1994, at the Francofolies Festival of La Rochelle, several artists gathered to pay a musical tribute to her career. For more than two hours, Michel Fugain, Alain Chamfort, Yves Duteil, William Sheller, Marc Lavoine, les Innocents, Paul Personne, Maxime le Forestier and I Muvrini, performed some of her biggest hits in duet with Sanson. This special tribute was made into a live album released the following year: Comme ils l'imaginent went 2× Platinum, and became one of the best-selling albums of 1995 in France.

In 1995, she married stand-up comedian Pierre Palmade in Triel-sur-Seine. She also recorded a duet with her son, Chris Stills, titled "Run". The song was released on a benefit album for children living with AIDS (Sol En Si). In 1996, she won her second Victoire de la musique for Best Female Artist of The Year.

Sanson started the production of a new album in 1997. The album was recorded in the United States, and Bernard Swell wrote and produced four of the album's songs. A sold-out tour followed the release of Indestructible, which went 2× gold. She performed in the Palais des sports of Paris in January 1998, then toured through France, and in the summer of 1999, Sanson performed at various festivals, including at France's largest rock Festival Les Vieilles Charrues.

== Long Distance: the 2000s ==
Sanson's cover album of Michel Berger songs – mostly from his early years – was released in 2000 (D'un papillon à une étoile) and went platinum in just a few weeks. It was followed by an extensive tour, produced by Paul Buckmaster (Elton John's arranger), and eventually by a live album (Avec vous). Sanson surrounded herself with her usual musicians, mostly Americans, as well as a classical ensemble from Prague. Her stage outfits for this tour were entirely created by Yves Saint Laurent.

In June 2000, she was invited to perform for President Jacques Chirac at the Elysée Palace for the Fête de la Musique.

In 2002, after a prolonged absence due to health problems, Sanson canceled a solo tour on which she would have accompanied herself only on piano. However, in September 2004, a few months after the press had announced her divorce from Pierre Palmade, she released a comeback album titled Longue Distance, produced by Bernard Saint-Paul. Longue Distance peaked at number 1 on the French charts. Her 2005 tour across France ended with nine concerts at the Olympia, during which she recorded her eighth live album.

In 2005, she released her autobiography, La Douceur du Danger (written with Didier Varrod), in which she discussed the most striking events of her life, particularly her alcoholism and her love life.

The "best-of", entitled Petits moments choisis, was released in November 2007, just as the singer started an unusually long tour which lasted until the summer of 2009. In December 2008, the limited edition 22CD/4DVD collection titled Et voilà !, including all her albums and videos as well as many previously unreleased tracks, sold out in less than a month.

In October 2008, she joined ex-husband Stills and her son, Chris Stills, on the stage of the Olympia, to perform a family version of Stills's "Love the One You're With".

In November 2008, rapper Jay-Z released a song called "History", to honor the election of US President Barack Obama. The song is based on samples and melodies from Véronique Sanson's 1972 recording of "Une nuit sur son épaule" (the original solo version, not the 1995 duet with Marc Lavoine). Jay-Z's song features Sanson on background vocals. In December 2008, she declared on Canal Plus's "Le Grand Journal" that she appreciated it, but would have preferred to be asked beforehand.

French-Canadian pop star Ima released a salsa-inspired reworking of "Chanson sur ma drôle de vie", followed in February 2009 by an associated video. Additionally, singer Lara Fabian released a cover version of "Amoureuse" in June on her studio album Toutes les femmes en moi.

== The 2010s ==
In March 2010, the two lead actresses of the film Tout ce qui brille released a cover of "Chanson sur ma drôle de vie" on the movie soundtrack. The song became a number one hit in France, while the original recording by Sanson peaked at number 2 on the French iTunes.

The album, titled Plusieurs lunes (Many Moons) was released on 25 October 2010, and debuted at number 3 on the French charts. Plusieurs Lunes caught the attention of the press who widely celebrated and highlighted the return of Sanson after a couple of fairly disappointing albums (namely Indestructible and Longue Distance). A song from this new piece, "La nuit se fait attendre", was made available on her official website in June 2010, while the second single, "Qu'on me pardonne" (written by her sister, Violaine) was released in early October. After a week-long residence at the Paris Olympia in March 2011, Sanson toured across France, Belgium, Switzerland, Tunisia, Israel before finishing touring at the end of 2012 with more shows in Paris, at the Grand Rex and Salle Pleyel.

In commemoration of the forty years anniversary of the release of Amoureuse (released on 20 March 1972), singer songwriter Jeanne Cherhal played a tribute concert on 21 March 2012 at the studio 104 in Paris at which all 12 tracks of the album were covered by the singer. The concert was broadcast on the radio France Inter on 6 April 2012.

On 14 May 2012, Warner Music released a box set containing a remastered CD of Amoureuse (including 10 demo songs, and a duet with Fanny Ardant), a vinyl version, a live CD recorded in Brussels in 2011, and a photo book.

In January 2015, she launched a new tour named "Les Années Américaines" (The American Years) at the Olympia, along with a book, composed of unreleased personal documents and pictures, and a 2CD Best of, also titled "Les Années Américaines". In March 2015, a Deluxe issue of the Best of with a previously unreleased recording of her 1975 concert at the Olympia was released. Initially planned to last until April 2015, the tour "Les Années Américaines" was prolonged to January 2016.

After 43 years under contract with Warner, she joined Sony. At the 2016 Victoires de la Musique, she was nominated for "Best Female Artist of the year", but lost to Yael Naim.

In November 2016, she released her 15th album Dignes, dingues, donc..., which debuted at number 3 on the French album charts. "Et je l'appelle encore" was the first single released.

At the 2017 Victoires de la Musique, she received two nominations: for "Best Female Artist of the year" (lost to Jain), and for "Best song of the year" with "Et je l'appelle encore" (lost to Vianney's "Je m'en vais"). Her 2017-2018 tour started on 30 June.

== Personal life ==
Sanson was romantically involved with French singer-songwriter Michel Berger from 1967 to 1972. Their love story has become a part of French musical lore, especially through songs they wrote to each other long after they broke up. From 1973 to 1979 she was married to American rock musician Stephen Stills. Their son, Chris Stills, is also a musician. She was later married to French comic Pierre Palmade from 1995 to 2001.

== Discography ==
=== Studio albums ===
- Amoureuse (1972)
- De l'autre côté de mon rêve (1972)
- Le maudit (1974)
- Vancouver (1976)
- Hollywood (1977)
- 7ème (1979)
- Laisse-la vivre (1981)
- Véronique Sanson (1985)
- Moi le venin (1988)
- Sans regrets (1992)
- Indestructible (1998)
- D'un papillon à une étoile (1999)
- Longue distance (2004)
- Plusieurs Lunes (2010)
- Dignes, dingues, donc... (2016)
- Duos volatils (2018)

=== Live albums ===
- Live at the Olympia 1976
- Au Palais des Sports 1981
- L'Olympia 1985
- A l'Olympia 89
- Symphonique Sanson (1989)
- Zenith 93
- Comme ils l'imaginent (1995)
- Véronique Sanson chante Michel Berger, Avec vous (2000)
- Olympia 2005
- Le Cirque Royal de Véronique Sanson (2012)
- Olympia 1975 (2015)
- Les années américaines: Le film (2016)

== Awards ==
- 1975: Silver Prize, Tokyo Music Festival
- 1978: Best Female Artist of the Year, Midem
- 1984: Named Chevalier of the Ordre des Arts et des Lettres by the French Ministry of Culture
- 1991: Grand Prix de la SACEM
- 1992: Medal of the French National Order of Merit
- 1993: Victoires de la musique Best Female Artist of the Year
- 1996: Victoires de la musique Best Female Artist of the Year
- 2005: Named Officer of the Ordre des Arts et des Lettres by the French Ministry of Culture
- 2013: Victoires de la musique Honorary Award
- 2015: Prix spécial de la SACEM
- 2015: "Grand Prix de la chanson française" from the Académie Française for her entire song catalog
- 2019: Commander of the Ordre des Arts et des Lettres
