= Perfect Timing (Kiki Dee album) =

Studio album by Kiki Dee
- Released: 19 June 1981
- Recorded: 1980–81
- Studios: RAK, London
- Genres: Pop, rock
- Length: 44:07
- Label: Ariola
- Producer: Pip Williams

Kiki Dee chronology
| Stay with Me (1979) | Perfect Timing (1981) | Angel Eyes (1987) |

Perfect Timing is the seventh studio album by British singer Kiki Dee, released by Ariola Records on 19 June 1981. The album marked a brief comeback for the singer, led by the top 20 single "Star". It was her only album on Ariola Records and reached No.47 on the UK album charts. The title track was also released, peaking at No.66. Two further singles were released; "Midnight Flyer" and "Loving You Is Sweeter Than Ever" (a duet with Elton John). The album was produced by Pip Williams.

The album was re-released on CD in 2008 with four bonus tracks - those included are "Give It Up", which had been released as a single in Japan in 1980 and was the B-side to "Star".

Opening track "Star" was later used as the opening theme for TV's Opportunity Knocks between 1987 and 1990. It was also used by Debenhams as part of their Christmas Advert 2018 with the tagline “do a bit of you know you did good”.

Among the musicians playing on this album are keyboardist Patrick Moraz of Yes and the Moody Blues and Steve Holley of Wings.

== Critical reception ==
Professional ratings
Review scores
| Source | Rating |
|---|---|
| AllMusic | 2/5 stars |
| Record Collector | 4/5 stars |
| Smash Hits | 3/5 stars |

AllMusic gave the album a highly positive review (despite it awarding it just two stars) saying that the album had "great substance" and was "a real gem worth hearing anytime and anyplace", while Record Collector said that on the album "she sings like [a star], treating highly-produced numbers such as the title track, roadhouse raunchers such as 'Midnight Flyer' and a slowed-down 'Loving You Is Sweeter Than Ever' (duetting with her pal Elt) with soul and panache".

== Track listing ==
Side One

1. "Star" (Doreen Chanter) – 3:18
2. "Loving You Is Sweeter Than Ever" (duet with Elton John) – (Ivy Hunter, Stevie Wonder) – 5:05
3. "Wild Eyes" (Chris Bradford) – 4:26
4. "Twenty Four Hours" (Reid Kaelin, Gary Osborne, Kiki Dee) – 4:15
5. "Perfect Timing (It Will Be Precise)" (Kit Hain) – 5:45

Side Two

1. "Midnight Flyer" (Doreen and Irene Chanter) – 3:30
2. "There's a Need" (Erik Kaz, Kiki Dee) – 4:10
3. "Another Break" (Pip Williams, Peter Hutchins) – 4:23
4. "Love is Just a Moment Away" (Teresa Straley, Eddy Brown) – 3:35
5. "You Are My Hope in This World" (Bias Boshell) – 5:40

Bonus tracks

1. "Give It Up" (Erik Kaz, Kiki Dee) – 4:15
2. "Perfect Timing" (12" version) (Kit Hain) – 7:20
3. "The Chase is Finally On" (Bias Boshell, Gary Osborne, Kiki Dee, Pip Williams) – 3:27
4. "Loving You Is Sweeter Than Ever" (Alternate Mix) (Ivy Hunter, Stevie Wonder) – 5:13

== Personnel ==
- Kiki Dee – vocals, all backing vocals (1), backing vocals (2–10), finger pops (5), handclaps (6)

Music credits

- Bias Boshell – keyboards, arrangements
- Patrick Moraz – keyboards, arrangements
- Pip Williams – guitars, arrangements
- Gary Twigg – bass, arrangements
- Bob Jenkins – drums, arrangements
- Steve Holley – drums, arrangements
- Frank Ricotti – percussion, arrangements

Track performers

- Bias Boshell – pianos (1, 3, 7, 10), Yamaha GX1 (1, 3), Roland SH-7 (1–7, 9), acoustic piano (2, 8, 9), Rhodes electric piano (2, 4–6, 8, 9), Wurlitzer electric piano (2, 6), Roland Vocoder (4), Prophet-5 (5), "backwards" piano (5), "awfully polite" voice (5), handclaps (6), string machine (7), backing vocals (8), explosions (9)
- Patrick Moraz – clavitar (8), backing vocals (8)
- Pip Williams – electric guitars (1–3, 5–10), "backwards" guitar solo (2), synth bass (2), marimba (2), acoustic guitars (3, 5, 7, 9), "half speed" guitar (3), Roland guitar synthesizer (3, 4, 6–9), backing vocals (3, 8), Ovation acoustic guitar (4), electric sitar (4), "backwards" guitars (5), cowbell (6), handclaps (6), bottleneck guitar solo (7), percussion (9), brass (9), guitar solo (10)
- Gary Twigg – bass guitar (1, 3, 5–7, 9, 10), fretless bass (2, 4, 7–10), handclaps (6), backing vocals (8)
- Bob Jenkins – drums (1–8, 10), Simmons Clap Trap (1), percussion (2, 3), timpanis (2, 5), "backwards" cymbals (2), Syndrums (4), gong (4), tea tray (5), cabasa (6), handclaps (6), backing vocals (8)
- Frank Ricotti – sleigh bells (1), tambourine (4, 7), vibraphone (4, 7), timpani's (7)
- Phil Thornalley – harp transplant (6)
- Elton John – vocals (2), backing vocals (2)
- The Kiki Dee Electric Choir – backing vocals (2)
- Chris Bradford – backing vocals (3)
- Steve Holley – backing vocals (3), drums (9)
- Kit Hain – backing vocals (5)
- Stevie Lange – backing vocals (6, 7, 9, 10), handclaps (6)
- Joy Yates – backing vocals (6, 7, 9, 10), handclaps (6)

== Production ==
- Pip Williams – producer
- Gregg Jackman – recording, mixing
- Phil Thornalley – recording, mixing
- Norman Goodman – assistant engineer
- Will Gosling – assistant engineer
- John Rule – assistant engineer
- Melvyn Abrahams – mastering at Strawberry Mastering (London, UK)
- David Shortt – art direction
- Adrian Sadgrove – logo design
- Clive Arrowsmith – photography
- Tantrums – photographic effects
- Barbara Daly – make-up
- Gordon Hatton – management
