= I'm in a Different World =

Single by The Four Tops

from the album Yesterday's Dreams
- B-side: "Remember When"
- Released: September 19, 1968
- Genre: Rhythm and blues
- Label: Motown
- Songwriter(s): Brian Holland, Lamont Dozier, and Edward Holland Jr.
- Producer(s): R. Dean Taylor; Brian Holland; Lamont Dozier

The Four Tops singles chronology
"Yesterday's Dreams" (1968)	"I'm in a Different World" (1968)	"What Is a Man" (1969)

"I'm In a Different World" is a song written and produced by Brian Holland, Lamont Dozier, and Edward Holland Jr. Billboard described the single as a "smooth swinger that moves and grooves throughout" which "should fast prove a sales topper."

== Background ==
"I'm in a Different World" is the final single that Holland–Dozier–Holland produced for the Four Tops before they left the label due to royalty disputes with Motown. The label issued the song in 1968 as the follow-up single to "Yesterday's Dreams".

== Credits ==
- Lead vocal by Levi Stubbs
- Background vocals by Abdul "Duke" Fakir, Lawrence Payton and Renaldo "Obie" Benson
- Additional background vocals by The Andantes
- Instrumentation by The Funk Brothers

== Chart history ==
"I'm in a Different World" peaked at number 51 on the US pop chart and number 27 on the UK chart.

Chart (1968)	Peak position
U.K. Singles Chart	27
U.S. Billboard Hot 100	51
U.S. Billboard Best Selling R&B Singles	33
