= Carol Lloyd (American singer) =

American singer

- Born: Carol Lloyd; Philadelphia, Pennsylvania, U.S.
- Occupation: Singer
- Musical career
- Genres: Disco; traditional pop
- Instrument: Vocals
- Years active: 1977–1983, 2010–2016
- Labels: Casablanca; EarMarc; Essential Music Group; Philly World

Carol Lloyd is an American singer from Philadelphia, Pennsylvania. She is known for the release of her two solo albums: Score in 1979 and Love Carol in 1983.

== Career ==
Carol Lloyd first signed to EarMarc Records in August 1979, the newest division of Casablanca Records, which in turn is chapter label owned by the Universal Music Group. Under EarMarc's supervision, she received enough funding to produce her debut studio album, which would become the disco-oriented Score (1979); Lloyd worked with producers Michael Forte and Bruce Weeden and recorded the album in her native town of Philadelphia at Alpha International Studios. She collaborated with several individuals, including saxophonist Mark Adler, design agency Gribbitt!, and drummer Robert Sonsini. Her debut single, and title track to the parent album, was released in September 1979. A cover of Four Tops's "Shake Me, Wake Me (When It's Over)", followed as the album's second and final single. It was distributed in December 1979, also by EarMarc. The single received frequent attention in dance clubs and heavy airplay by disc jockeys.

Love Carol served as the follow-up to Score and was released in 1983 by a different label, independently-owned Philly World Records. Unlike its predecessor, it was largely unsuccessful and received little to no attention. It along with Score was digitally reissued in the United States in 2014 and 2016, respectively, by the Essential Music Group.

== Discography ==
- Score (1979)
- Love Carol (1983)

=== Singles ===
List of singles as lead artist, with selected chart positions, showing year released and album name
Title	Year	Peak chart positions	Album
Title	Year	US Dance	Album
"Score"	1979	—	Score
"Shake Me, Wake Me"	1979	89	Score
"Come See About Me"	1983	—	Love Carol
