= Yesterday's Dreams (song) =

- Solid center variant of the UK single

Single by The Four Tops

from the album Yesterday's Dreams
- B-side: "For Once in My Life"
- Released: June 27, 1968
- Genre: Rhythm and blues
- Label: Motown
- Songwriter(s): Vernon Bullock, Jack Goga, Ivy Jo Hunter and Pam Sawyer.
- Producer(s): Ivy Jo Hunter

The Four Tops singles chronology
"If I Were a Carpenter" (1968)	"Yesterday's Dreams" (1968)	"I'm in a Different World" (1968)

"Yesterday's Dreams" is a 1968 single recorded by The Four Tops for the Motown label. The song was written by Vernon Bullock, Jack Goga, Ivy Jo Hunter and Pam Sawyer. The single was one of the first the group released after the departure of Holland-Dozier-Holland, who had handled the majority of the Four Tops recordings prior to 1968. Released from the album of the same name, the song only became a modest hit on the US chart, peaking at #31 on Billboard's Best Selling Soul Singles chart and #49 on the Hot 100. Outside of the US, "Yesterday's Dreams" reached #23 in the UK.

Billboard described the single as a "driving rhythm ballad aimed right at the top of the Hot 100," stating that it was one of the Four Tops' "most potent performances." Cash Box said that the group is "grooving in a melancholy blues waltz tempo with a song that builds in volume and impact as the story of lost love develops."

== Personnel ==
- Lead vocal by Levi Stubbs
- Background vocals by Abdul "Duke" Fakir, Renaldo "Obie" Benson, and Lawrence Payton
- Additional background vocals by The Andantes
- Instrumentation by The Funk Brothers
