= Amoureuse =

1972 single by Véronique Sanson

Single by Véronique Sanson

from the album Amoureuse
- B-side: "'Mariavah'"
- Released: March 1972
- Length: 3:39
- Label: Elektra / Warner Music Group
- Songwriter: Véronique Sanson
- Producer: Michel Berger

Véronique Sanson singles chronology
"'Le printemps est là'" (1969)	"Amoureuse" (1972)	"Besoin de personne" (1972)

"Amoureuse"
- New Zealand single of the Kiki Dee recording

Single by Kiki Dee

from the album Loving and Free
- B-side: "'Rest My Head'"
- Released: 31 August 1973
- Genre: Easy listening
- Length: 4:09 (album version)
- Label: The Rocket Record Company
- Songwriters: Véronique Sanson; Gary Osborne
- Producers: Elton John, Clive Franks

Kiki Dee singles chronology
"Lonnie and Josie" (1973)	"Amoureuse" (1973)	"Hard Luck Story" (1974)

Live music video
- "Amoureuse": on Top Pop on YouTube

"Amoureuse" is a French language composition by Véronique Sanson introduced on her 1972 album of the same name. Rendered in English the song became a hit single for Kiki Dee and – as "Emotion" – for Helen Reddy.

== Background and first recordings ==
The original song title "Amoureuse" – which does not feature in its lyrics – is the French equivalent of the English adjective amorous and is also a feminine noun meaning "woman in love", lover. Sanson's lyric describes the contradictory feelings of passion and fear of a woman involved in a new love affair. Sanson was inspired to write the song while driving "up the Champs-Élysées in my little Autobianchi A112" at six a.m.: "It was a feeling of freedom... I was constantly monitored... and I wrote this song because I knew I was going to get yelled at by my parents [upon arriving home]." "Amoureuse" had its first major impact out of France via a cover version for the Quebec market by France Castel (fr) which reached #1 on the French-language chart for Canada in December 1972: the track was featured on Castel's 1973 album release Je le vois dans ma soupe.

The earliest English rendering of the song was by lyricist Gary Osborne, who from the age of 15 had written English lyrics for a number of French-language songs beginning with "Adiós Amor" in 1967. While faithfully rendering Sanson's lyrics in the chorus, Osborne in the verses introduced the concept of an initial sexual encounter into the song. The first evident recording of this version was by Sanson herself with UK and US single releases in respectively September 1972 and November 1972.

The Sanson/Osborne version of "Amoureuse" was then recorded in April 1973 by Kiki Dee who credits Tony King, vice president of Rocket Records, with suggesting that she record "Amoureuse" for her album Loving and Free produced by Elton John: issued as a single 31 August 1973, Dee's "Amoureuse" made a belated chart entry in November 1973 to rise to a UK chart peak of #13 that December, besting an attempted cover version by Polly Brown issued 21 September 1973.

Almost a year after her UK success with "Amoureuse", the track would afford Dee a chart hit in Australia with a #12 peak in the autumn of 1974. In the US, "Amoureuse" served as the B-side for the February 1975 Kiki Dee Band release "Step by Step", the non-charting follow-up single to "I've Got the Music in Me".

"Amoureuse" was re-issued in the UK as the B-side of the 1976 Kiki Dee single "Loving & Free": the single became a double-sided hit reaching #13 on the UK chart and #4 in Ireland. A 1984 reissue of Dee's "Amoureuse" reached #77 on the UK chart.

== "Emotion" - Patti Dahlstrom version also recorded by Helen Reddy ==
"Emotion"
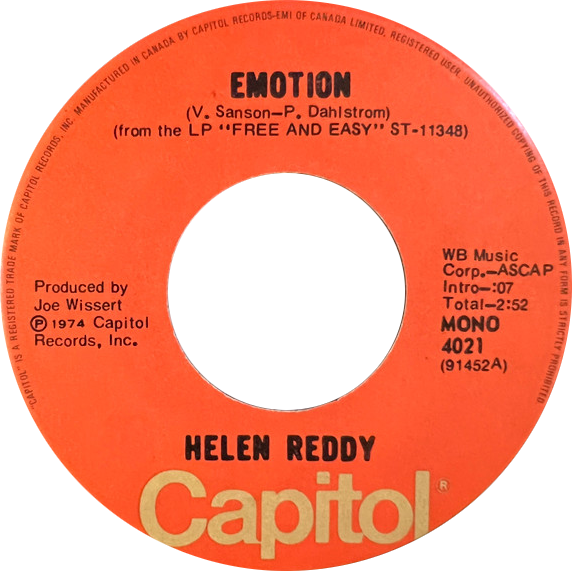
- Canadian single of the Helen Reddy recording

Single by Helen Reddy

from the album Free and Easy
- B-side: "I've Been Wanting You So Long"
- Released: January 1975
- Genre: Easy listening
- Length: 2:54
- Label: Capitol
- Songwriters: Véronique Sanson; Patti Dahlstrom
- Producer: Joe Wissert

Helen Reddy singles chronology
"Angie Baby" (1974)	"Emotion" (1975)	"Bluebird" (1975)

Artie Wayne, an exec with the Warner Music Group whose Elektra label handled Sanson's U.S. releases, sent a copy of Sanson's Amoureuse album to his friend Texas singer/songwriter Patti Dahlstrom suggesting Dahlstrom put English lyrics to the title cut. Dahlstrom would recall: "I was mesmerised by the music to 'Amoureuse', but I don’t speak French and had no idea what the lyrics meant. I carried the melody in my head for weeks and then one day the first line – 'Lonely women are the desperate kind' – just fell out as my key turned in the lock, and the lyric to 'Emotion' wrote itself very quickly."

Dahlstrom's English rendering of "Amoureuse" was introduced on the singer's own album The Way I Am which was recorded in August 1973: the track re-entitled Sanson's composition as "Emotion", that word being prominently featured in Dahlstrom's lyrics which expressed the viewpoint of a woman whose relationship with an inconsiderate lover is redeemed by the passion of their periodic trysts. "Emotion" was issued as a single off The Way I Am in October 1973 but did not chart.

Patti Dahlstrom was also a friend of Paul Williams whose own compositions were regularly recorded by Helen Reddy, and Reddy recorded "Emotion" for inclusion on her 1974 Free and Easy album from which an abridged edit was issued as a single in January 1975 to peak at #22, Reddy's first Top Twenty shortfall since before "I Am Woman" in 1972. "Emotion" did reach #1 on the Easy Listening chart, the sixth of Reddy's eight Easy Listening #1's and her last consecutive.

In 2009, Véronique Sanson stated in an interview to the French magazine Platine that Dahlstrom's version remains her favorite version of "Amoureuse", although Dahlstrom's "Emotion" is lyrically distinct from the Osborne translation.

== Other versions ==
With its original French lyrics "Amoureuse" has also been recorded by many singers in France, Belgium and Québec, including Hart-Rouge (album La fabrique / 1994), Lucid Beausonge (fr) (album Ils chantent Véronique Sanson / 1996), Réjane Perry (fr) (album Atlas, Les plus belles chansons françaises, 1972 / 1996), Les Enfoirés (Jean-Louis Aubert, Hélène Ségara, Natasha St-Pier, Christophe Willem) (album Les Enfoirés font leur cinéma / 2009), Lara Fabian (album Toutes les femmes en moi / 2009), and Caroline Néron (album Le destin /2010).

Olivia Newton-John recorded "Amoureuse" with the Gary Osborne-penned lyrics for her 1973 album Music Makes My Day and would remake the song as a duet with Elaine Paige for Paige's 2010 duets album Elaine Paige and Friends. In 1998 Barbara Dex reached #10 on the Ultratip chart with her version of Amoureuse with Osborne's lyrics: the track was also included on Dex's album Strong. "Amoureuse" with Osborne's lyrics has also been recorded by Linda Martin (album You Needed Me/ 1998) and Deborah Sasson (album Romance/ 1984), among others.

Shirley Bassey recorded "Emotion" for her 1975 album Good, Bad but Beautiful.

Véronique Sanson recorded "Amoureuse" with German lyrics by Michael Kunze (released b/w "Regen am Morgen (Besoin de Personne)"), and also recorded a Spanish version entitled "Enamorada". The German-language rendering of "Amoureuse" with lyrics by Michael Kunze was also recorded by Katja Ebstein, appearing on her 1977 album Liebe under the title "Für einen Tag mit dir".

Daniela Davoli had a 1978 single release of an Italian rendering of "Amoureuse" entitled "Diverso amore mio" ("Other than my love"), written by lyricist Cristiano Magioglio, which was that same year recorded by Véronique Sanson (single "Povero maledetto" (Le maudit) / "Diverso amore mio" (Amoureuse)).

== See also ==
- List of number-one adult contemporary singles of 1975 (U.S.)
