= Loving You Is Sweeter Than Ever =

1966 song by the Four Tops

- Dutch picture sleeve

Single by Four Tops

from the album On Top
- B-side: "I Like Everything About You"
- Released: May 9, 1966
- Recorded: April 5, 1966
- Venue: Hitsville U.S.A., Detroit
- Genre: Soul, pop
- Label: Motown
- Songwriter(s): Ivy Jo Hunter, Stevie Wonder
- Producer(s): Ivy Jo Hunter

Four Tops singles chronology
"Shake Me, Wake Me (When It's Over)" (1966)	"Loving You Is Sweeter Than Ever" (1966)	"Reach Out I'll Be There" (1966)

"Loving You Is Sweeter Than Ever" is a song written by Ivy Jo Hunter and Stevie Wonder, originally released in 1966 by the Four Tops via the Motown label. In addition to co-writing the song, Wonder also instrumentally contributed drums to the track.

Cash Box described the song as a "hard-pounding, rhythmic, pop-R&B romancer all about a lucky guy who has finally found the gal that he’s always dreamed about." Record World described it as a "teen beat love ode."

== Personnel ==
- Lead vocals by Levi Stubbs
- Background vocals by Abdul "Duke" Fakir, Renaldo "Obie" Benson & Lawrence Payton
- Drums by Stevie Wonder
- Other instrumentation by the Funk Brothers

== Chart performance ==
The song peaked at number 12 on the Billboard Hot Rhythm & Blues Singles chart and number 45 on the Billboard Hot 100.

== Cover versions ==
- Nick Kamen released a version in 1987, where it went to number 16 on the UK Singles Chart. Lola Borg of Smash Hits panned the song she described as an "outrage" to the original version and a "shocking business", adding it was "murdered" by Kamen who "reduce[d] it to utter mush".
- The Band frequently performed the song as an encore, and recordings have been included on the reissues of their self-titled sophomore album, The Band; Rock of Ages; and the 2013 boxed set Live at the Academy of Music 1971.
- Kiki Dee and Elton John did a duet cover on Dee's 1981 album Perfect Timing.
- Susan Tedeschi covered it on her 2005 album Hope and Desire.
