= Billboard Year-End Hot 100 singles of 1972 =

Ranking of recorded music

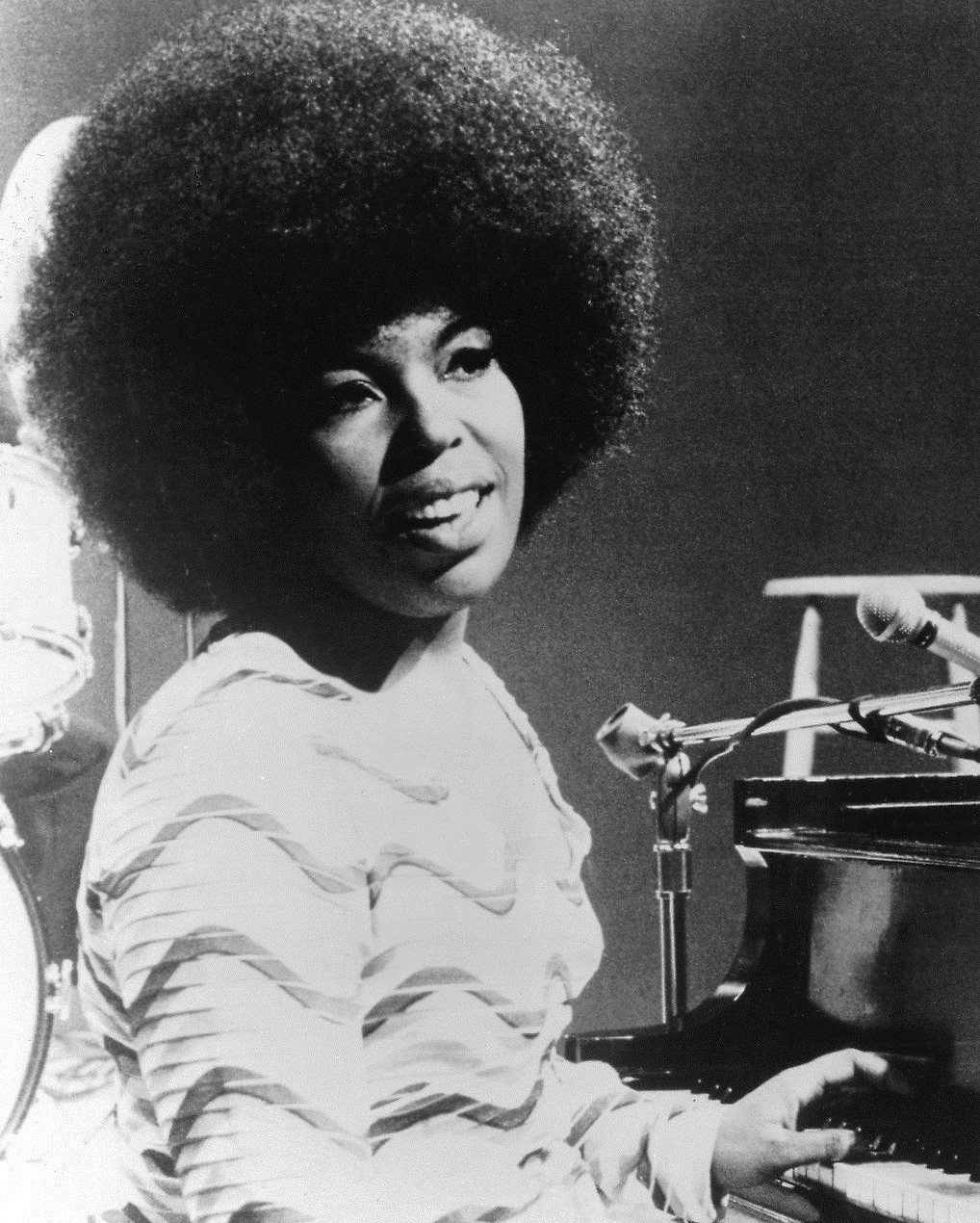
"The First Time Ever I Saw Your Face" by Roberta Flack was the number one song of 1972.

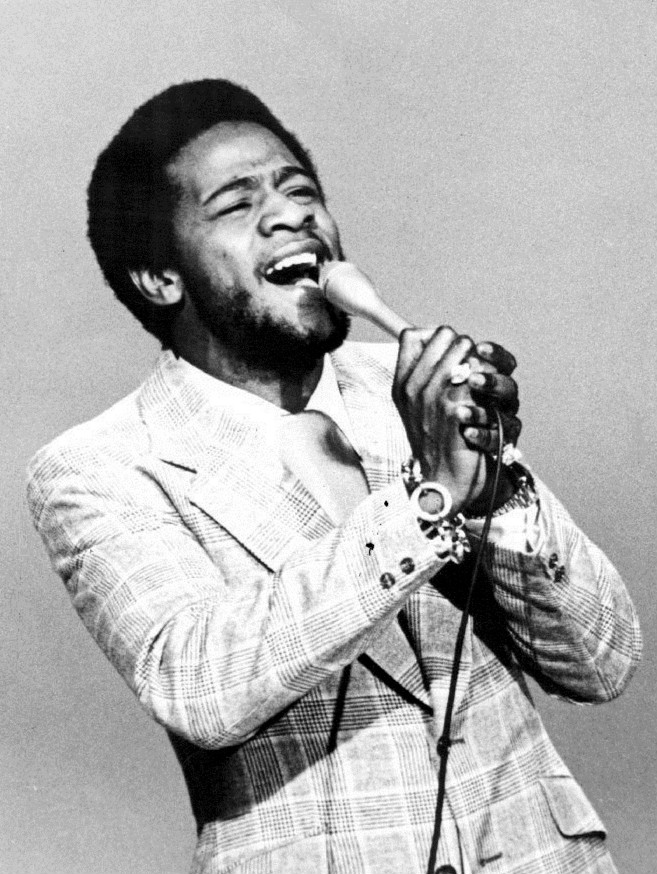
Al Green had three songs on the Year-End Hot 100, the most of any artist in 1972.

This is a list of Billboard magazine's Top Hot 100 songs of 1972. The Top 100, as revealed in the year-end edition of Billboard dated December 30, 1972, is based on Hot 100 charts from the issue dates of December 4, 1971 through November 18, 1972.

No.	Title	Artist(s)
1	"The First Time Ever I Saw Your Face"	Roberta Flack
2	"Alone Again (Naturally)"	Gilbert O'Sullivan
3	"American Pie"	Don McLean
4	"Without You"	Harry Nilsson
5	"The Candy Man"	Sammy Davis Jr.
6	"I Gotcha"	Joe Tex
7	"Lean on Me"	Bill Withers
8	"Baby, Don't Get Hooked on Me"	Mac Davis
9	"Brand New Key"	Melanie
10	"Daddy Don't You Walk So Fast"	Wayne Newton
11	"Let's Stay Together"	Al Green
12	"Brandy (You're a Fine Girl)"	Looking Glass
13	"Oh Girl"	The Chi-Lites
14	"Nice to Be with You"	Gallery
15	"My Ding-a-Ling"	Chuck Berry
16	"(If Loving You Is Wrong) I Don't Want to Be Right"	Luther Ingram
17	"Heart of Gold"	Neil Young
18	"Betcha by Golly, Wow"	The Stylistics
19	"I'll Take You There"	The Staple Singers
20	"Ben"	Michael Jackson
21	"The Lion Sleeps Tonight"	Robert John
22	"Outa-Space"	Billy Preston
23	"Slippin' into Darkness"	War
24	"Long Cool Woman in a Black Dress"	The Hollies
25	"How Do You Do"	Mouth & MacNeal
26	"Song Sung Blue"	Neil Diamond
27	"A Horse with No Name"	America
28	"Popcorn"	Hot Butter
29	"Everybody Plays the Fool"	The Main Ingredient
30	"Precious and Few"	Climax
31	"(Last Night) I Didn't Get to Sleep at All"	The 5th Dimension
32	"Nights in White Satin"	The Moody Blues
33	"Go All the Way"	Raspberries
34	"Too Late to Turn Back Now"	Cornelius Brothers & Sister Rose
35	"Back Stabbers"	The O'Jays
36	"Down by the Lazy River"	The Osmonds
37	"Sunshine"	Jonathan Edwards
38	"Starting All Over Again"	Mel and Tim
39	"Day After Day"	Badfinger
40	"Rocket Man"	Elton John
41	"Rockin' Robin"	Michael Jackson
42	"Beautiful Sunday"	Daniel Boone
43	"Scorpio"	Dennis Coffey
44	"Morning Has Broken"	Cat Stevens
45	"City of New Orleans"	Arlo Guthrie
46	"Garden Party"	Ricky Nelson
47	"I Can See Clearly Now"	Johnny Nash
48	"Burning Love"	Elvis Presley
49	"Clean Up Woman"	Betty Wright
50	"Hold Your Head Up"	Argent
51	"Jungle Fever"	The Chakachas
52	"Everything I Own"	Bread
53	"In the Rain"	The Dramatics
54	"Look What You Done for Me"	Al Green
55	"The Happiest Girl in the Whole U.S.A."	Donna Fargo
56	"Bang a Gong (Get it On)"	T. Rex
57	"Mother and Child Reunion"	Paul Simon
58	"Where Is the Love"	Roberta Flack & Donny Hathaway
59	"I'm Still in Love with You"	Al Green
60	"Layla"	Derek and the Dominos
61	"Day Dreaming"	Aretha Franklin
62	"The Way of Love"	Cher
63	"Black and White"	Three Dog Night
64	"Sylvia's Mother"	Dr. Hook & the Medicine Show
65	"Hurting Each Other"	The Carpenters
66	"Coconut"	Harry Nilsson
67	"Puppy Love"	Donny Osmond
68	"You Don't Mess Around with Jim"	Jim Croce
69	"Hot Rod Lincoln"	Commander Cody and His Lost Planet Airmen
70	"A Cowboy's Work Is Never Done"	Sonny & Cher
71	"Joy"	Apollo 100
72	"Anticipation"	Carly Simon
73	"Never Been to Spain"	Three Dog Night
74	"Kiss an Angel Good Mornin'"	Charley Pride
75	"School's Out"	Alice Cooper
76	"Saturday in the Park"	Chicago
77	"Drowning in the Sea of Love"	Joe Simon
78	"Use Me"	Bill Withers
79	"Family Affair"	Sly & the Family Stone
80	"Troglodyte (Cave Man)"	The Jimmy Castor Bunch
81	"The Witch Queen of New Orleans"	Redbone
82	"Freddie's Dead"	Curtis Mayfield
83	"Power of Love"	Joe Simon
84	"Ain't Understanding Mellow"	Jerry Butler & Brenda Lee Eager
85	"Taxi"	Harry Chapin
86	"Don't Say You Don't Remember"	Beverly Bremers
87	"Sealed with a Kiss"	Bobby Vinton
88	"I Saw the Light"	Todd Rundgren
89	"Motorcycle Mama"	Sailcat
90	"Day by Day"	Original Cast of Godspell
91	"Roundabout"	Yes
92	"Doctor My Eyes"	Jackson Browne
93	"I'd Like to Teach the World to Sing (In Perfect Harmony)"	The New Seekers
94	"Vincent"	Don McLean
95	"Baby Let Me Take You (In My Arms)"	The Detroit Emeralds
96	"Speak to the Sky"	Rick Springfield
97	"I'd Like to Teach the World to Sing (In Perfect Harmony)"	The Hillside Singers
98	"Walkin' in the Rain with the One I Love"	Love Unlimited
99	"Get on the Good Foot"	James Brown
100	"Pop That Thang"	The Isley Brothers

== See also ==
- 1972 in music
- Billboard Year-End Best Selling Soul Singles of 1972
- List of Billboard Hot 100 number-one singles of 1972
- List of Billboard Hot 100 top-ten singles in 1972
