= List of Billboard Hot 100 top-ten singles in 1972 =

This is a list of singles that have peaked in the Top 10 of the Billboard Hot 100 during 1972.

Al Green scored four top ten hits during the year with "Let's Stay Together", "Look What You Done for Me", "I'm Still in Love with You", and "You Ought to Be with Me", the most among all other artists.

== Top-ten singles ==
- (#) – 1972 Year-end top 10 single position and rank

Top ten entry date	Single	Artist(s)	Peak	Peak date	Weeks in top ten
Singles from 1971
December 18	"American Pie" (#3)	Don McLean	1	January 15	11
December 25	"Scorpio"	Dennis Coffey	6	January 8	6
December 25	"Hey Girl"/"I Knew You When"	Donny Osmond	9	January 15	4
Singles from 1972
January 1	"Sunshine"	Jonathan Edwards	4	January 15	6
January 8	"Let's Stay Together"	Al Green	1	February 12	9
January 8	"I'd Like to Teach the World to Sing (in Perfect Harmony)"	The New Seekers	7	January 15	3
January 15	"Clean Up Woman"	Betty Wright	6	January 29	3
January 22	"Day After Day"	Badfinger	4	February 5	4
January 22	"You Are Everything"	The Stylistics	9	January 22	2
January 22	"Sugar Daddy"	The Jackson 5	10	January 22	2
January 29	"Never Been to Spain"	Three Dog Night	5	February 12	4
February 5	"Without You" (#4)	Nilsson	1	February 19	9
February 5	"Hurting Each Other"	The Carpenters	2	February 26	6
February 5	"Precious and Few"	Climax	3	February 26	7
February 5	"Joy"	Apollo 100	6	February 26	4
February 12	"Down by the Lazy River"	The Osmonds	4	March 4	6
February 19	"The Lion Sleeps Tonight"	Robert John	3	March 11	8
February 19	"Everything I Own"	Bread	5	March 4	6
February 26	"Sweet Seasons"	Carole King	9	March 4	2
March 4	"Heart of Gold"	Neil Young	1	March 18	8
March 4	"Bang a Gong (Get It On)"	T. Rex	10	March 4	2
March 11	"A Horse with No Name"	America	1	March 25	10
March 11	"The Way of Love"	Cher	7	March 25	3
March 18	"Puppy Love"	Donny Osmond	3	April 1	5
March 18	"Mother and Child Reunion"	Paul Simon	4	April 1	4
March 25	"I Gotcha" (#6)	Joe Tex	2	May 6	10
March 25	"Jungle Fever"	The Chakachas	8	March 25	3
April 1	"The First Time Ever I Saw Your Face" (#1)	Roberta Flack	1	April 15	11
April 1	"Rockin' Robin"	Michael Jackson	2	April 22	8
April 8	"In the Rain"	The Dramatics	5	April 22	4
April 15	"Betcha by Golly, Wow"	The Stylistics	3	May 6	6
April 15	"Day Dreaming"	Aretha Franklin	5	May 6	5
April 15	"A Cowboy's Work Is Never Done"	Sonny & Cher	8	April 29	3
April 22	"Doctor My Eyes"	Jackson Browne	8	May 6	3
April 29	"Look What You Done for Me"	Al Green	4	May 27	6
May 6	"I'll Take You There"	The Staple Singers	1	June 3	8
May 6	"Back Off Boogaloo"	Ringo Starr	9	May 13	3
May 13	"Oh Girl"	The Chi-Lites	1	May 27	7
May 20	"Morning Has Broken"	Cat Stevens	6	May 27	4
May 20	"Tumbling Dice"	The Rolling Stones	7	May 27	3
May 27	"The Candy Man" (#5)	Sammy Davis Jr.	1	June 10	7
May 27	"Sylvia's Mother"	Dr. Hook & the Medicine Show	5	June 3	4
May 27	"Hot Rod Lincoln"	Commander Cody and His Lost Planet Airmen	9	June 3	2
June 3	"Nice to Be with You"	Gallery	4	June 24	5
June 10	"Song Sung Blue"	Neil Diamond	1	July 1	6
June 10	"Outa-Space"	Billy Preston	2	July 8	6
June 10	"(Last Night) I Didn't Get to Sleep at All"	The 5th Dimension	8	June 17	3
June 17	"Lean on Me" (#7)	Bill Withers	1	July 8	7
June 17	"Troglodyte (Cave Man)"	The Jimmy Castor Bunch	6	June 24	4
June 24	"Too Late to Turn Back Now"	Cornelius Brothers & Sister Rose	2	July 15	8
July 1	"Daddy Don't You Walk So Fast" (#10)	Wayne Newton	4	August 5	8
July 1	"Rocket Man"	Elton John	6	July 15	4
July 1	"I Need You"	America	9	July 1	2
July 8	"(If Loving You Is Wrong) I Don't Want to Be Right"	Luther Ingram	3	August 5	8
July 15	"Alone Again (Naturally)" (#2)	Gilbert O'Sullivan	1	July 29	11
July 15	"Brandy (You're a Fine Girl)"	Looking Glass	1	August 26	10
July 15	"Where Is the Love"	Roberta Flack & Donny Hathaway	5	August 12	6
July 22	"School's Out"	Alice Cooper	7	July 29	4
July 22	"How Do You Do"	Mouth & MacNeal	8	July 22	4
July 29	"Long Cool Woman in a Black Dress"	The Hollies	2	September 2	8
August 5	"Layla"	Derek and the Dominos	10	August 5	1
August 12	"I'm Still in Love with You"	Al Green	3	September 2	6
August 19	"Hold Your Head Up"	Argent	5	August 26	3
August 19	"Goodbye to Love"	The Carpenters	7	August 26	3
August 19	"Coconut"	Nilsson	8	August 26	2
August 26	"Baby, Don't Get Hooked on Me" (#8)	Mac Davis	1	September 23	9
August 26	"You Don't Mess Around with Jim"	Jim Croce	8	September 2	3
September 2	"Back Stabbers"	The O'Jays	3	October 7	7
September 2	"Rock and Roll Part 2"	Gary Glitter	7	September 9	4
September 9	"Black and White"	Three Dog Night	1	September 16	5
September 9	"Saturday in the Park"	Chicago	3	September 23	4
September 16	"Honky Cat"	Elton John	8	September 23	2
September 23	"Ben"	Michael Jackson	1	October 14	7
September 23	"Everybody Plays the Fool"	The Main Ingredient	3	October 14	6
September 23	"Go All the Way"	Raspberries	5	October 7	5
September 30	"Use Me"	Bill Withers	2	October 14	5
September 30	"Burning Love"	Elvis Presley	2	October 28	6
September 30	"Popcorn"	Hot Butter	9	October 21	4
October 7	"My Ding-a-Ling"	Chuck Berry	1	October 21	6
October 14	"Nights in White Satin"	The Moody Blues	2	November 4	7
October 21	"Garden Party"	Rick Nelson	6	November 4	4
October 28	"I Can See Clearly Now"	Johnny Nash	1	November 4	8
October 28	"Freddie's Dead"	Curtis Mayfield	4	November 4	4
October 28	"Good Time Charlie's Got the Blues"	Danny O'Keefe	9	November 4	2
November 4	"I'd Love You to Want Me"	Lobo	2	November 18	5
November 4	"I'll Be Around"	The Spinners	3	November 18	5
November 11	"I Am Woman"	Helen Reddy	1	December 9	8
November 11	"Convention '72"	The Delegates	8	November 18	2
November 11	"Witchy Woman"	Eagles	9	November 18	2
November 18	"Papa Was a Rollin' Stone"	The Temptations	1	December 2	6
November 18	"Summer Breeze"	Seals and Crofts	6	November 25	3
November 25	"If You Don't Know Me by Now"	Harold Melvin & the Blue Notes	3	December 9	5
November 25	"You Ought to Be with Me"	Al Green	3	December 23	7
November 25	"If I Could Reach You"	The 5th Dimension	10	November 25	1
December 2	"It Never Rains in Southern California"	Albert Hammond	5	December 16	6
December 2	"Ventura Highway"	America	8	December 9	3
December 9	"Me and Mrs. Jones"	Billy Paul	1	December 16	8
December 9	"Clair"	Gilbert O'Sullivan	2	December 30	7
December 9	"I'm Stone in Love with You"	The Stylistics	10	December 9	2

=== 1971 peaks ===
List of Billboard Hot 100 top ten singles in 1972 which peaked in 1971
Top ten entry date	Single	Artist(s)	Peak	Peak date	Weeks in top ten
November 13	"Have You Seen Her"	The Chi-Lites	3	December 11	8
November 20	"Family Affair"	Sly and the Family Stone	1	December 4	9
November 20	"Got to Be There"	Michael Jackson	4	December 11	9
December 4	"An Old Fashioned Love Song"	Three Dog Night	4	December 18	5
December 11	"Brand New Key" (#9)	Melanie	1	December 25	10
December 18	"Cherish"	David Cassidy	9	December 25	4

=== 1973 peaks ===
List of Billboard Hot 100 top ten singles in 1972 which peaked in 1973
Top ten entry date	Single	Artist(s)	Peak	Peak date	Weeks in top ten
December 23	"You're So Vain"	Carly Simon	1	January 6	11
December 23	"Funny Face"	Donna Fargo	5	January 6	4
December 23	"Rockin' Pneumonia and the Boogie Woogie Flu"	Johnny Rivers	6	January 20	6
December 30	"Your Mama Don't Dance"	Loggins and Messina	4	January 27	6
December 30	"Superfly"	Curtis Mayfield	8	January 13	4

== See also ==
- 1972 in music
- List of Billboard Hot 100 number ones of 1972
- Billboard Year-End Hot 100 singles of 1972
