= Masterdisk =

American multimedia company in New York

- Type: Audio mastering
- Founded: 1973
- Headquarters: Peekskill, New York, United States

Masterdisk is an American multimedia company in New York, located at 8 John Walsh Boulevard in Peekskill. They provide production services such as audio mastering, vinyl cutting and enhanced CD and DVD production.

Their clients include such notable acts as Accept, Sting, Jay-Z, Kanye West, Spoon, Nirvana, Lou Reed, David Bowie, U2, Gorillaz, John Zorn, DMX, The Rolling Stones, Steely Dan, Bob Dylan, Metallica, Aerosmith and the Beatles.

Masterdisk was founded in 1973 as a spin-off of the recording, editing and mastering arm of Mercury Records. Among the company's early mastering engineers were Gilbert Kong, who worked on early 1970s albums by such artists as Rod Stewart and Bachman–Turner Overdrive, and who also mastered singles, including "Ain't Understanding Mellow" by Jerry Butler and Brenda Lee Eager, and "The Night Chicago Died" by Paper Lace; and Phil Austin, who mastered most of the singles including Stewart's "Maggie May" and "You Wear It Well," "Beautiful Sunday" by Daniel Boone, "I Love" by Tom T. Hall, "How Do You Do" by Mouth & MacNeal, and "I Gotcha" by Joe Tex.

Masterdisk is currently owned and operated by Scott Hull, who was the assistant to Bob Ludwig in 1984–1993, then chief engineer until 1999. In 2008 Hull purchased the business from then-CEO, Doug Levine.

Current mastering engineers include Scott Hull, Tony Dawsey, Andy VanDette, Roger Lian, Randy Merrill, Matt Agoglia, Alex DeTurk, Jeff Reeves, Mark Santangelo, Tim Boyce, Matt Shane, Graham Goldman, Marcos Sueiro Bal, Michael Tucci and Andy Wilson. Former Masterdisk engineers include Bob Ludwig, Leon Zervos, Greg Calbi, Don Grossinger, Greg Fulginiti, Howie Weinberg, Dave McNair and Drew Cappotto.
