= Billboard Year-End Best Selling Soul Singles of 1972 =

American music chart

This is a list of Billboard magazine's Top Best Selling Soul Singles of 1972.

No.	Title	Artist(s)
1	"Let's Stay Together"	Al Green
2	"I'll Take You There"	The Staple Singers
3	"(If Loving You Is Wrong) I Don't Want to Be Right"	Luther Ingram
4	"In the Rain"	The Dramatics
5	"Oh Girl"	The Chi-Lites
6	"Back Stabbers"	The O'Jays
7	"That's the Way I Feel About Cha"	Bobby Womack
8	"Everybody Plays the Fool"	The Main Ingredient
9	"Do the Funky Penguin"	Rufus Thomas
10	"I Gotcha"	Joe Tex
11	"You Said a Bad Word"	Joe Tex
12	"Clean Up Woman"	Betty Wright
13	"Lean on Me"	Bill Withers
14	"Outa-Space"	Billy Preston
15	"Get on the Good Foot"	James Brown
16	"Woman's Gotta Have It"	Bobby Womack
17	"Day Dreaming"	Aretha Franklin
18	"Power of Love"	Joe Simon
19	"Look What You Done for Me"	Al Green
20	"Freddie's Dead"	Curtis Mayfield
21	"Think (About It)"	Lyn Collins
22	"Drowning in the Sea of Love"	Joe Simon
23	"Sugar Daddy"	The Jackson 5
24	"I'm Still in Love with You"	Al Green
25	"Ain't Understanding Mellow"	Jerry Butler and Brenda Lee Eager
26	"Ask Me What You Want"	Millie Jackson
27	"Pop That Thang"	The Isley Brothers
28	"Family Affair"	Sly and the Family Stone
29	"Use Me"	Bill Withers
30	"Ben"	Michael Jackson
31	"Betcha by Golly, Wow"	The Stylistics
32	"Fire and Water"	Wilson Pickett
33	"You Want It, You Got It"	The Detroit Emeralds
34	"I'll Be Around"	The Spinners
35	"Where Is the Love"	Roberta Flack and Donny Hathaway
36	"Woman Don't Go Astray"	King Floyd
37	"I Wanna Be Where You Are"	Michael Jackson
38	"Baby Let Me Take You (In My Arms)"	The Detroit Emeralds
39	"Close to You"	Jerry Butler
40	"Now Run and Tell That"	Denise LaSalle
41	"Hearsay"	The Soul Children
42	"Make Me the Woman That You Go Home To"	Gladys Knight & the Pips
43	"My Man, a Sweet Man"	Millie Jackson
44	"The First Time Ever I Saw Your Face"	Roberta Flack
45	"You Are Everything"	The Stylistics
46	"One Monkey Don't Stop No Show"	Honey Cone
47	"Talkin' Loud and Sayin' Nothing"	James Brown
48	"Rip Off"	Laura Lee
49	"I Miss You"	Harold Melvin & the Blue Notes
50	"I've Been Lonely for So Long"	Frederick Knight

== See also ==
- 1972 in music
- Billboard Year-End Hot 100 singles of 1972
- List of Best Selling Soul Singles number ones of 1972
