= List of number-one singles of 1972 (Canada) =

This is a list of the weekly Canadian RPM magazine (Note: The magazine's weekly record charts were digitized by the AV Trust. The collection is archived by Library and Archives Canada here. The PDF text search does not work unless you have additional software installed. You must view each entry on the chart for a match.) number one Top Singles chart of 1972. (Note: A collection of all the .pdf files cited is available here.) (Note: On 21 March 1966, the chart became the RPM 100, as expanded to the top 100 singles.)

Volume:Issue	Issue Date(s)	Song	Artist
16:20	8 January	"Brand New Key"	Melanie
16:21/22	15 January	"Brand New Key"	Melanie
16:23	22 January	"American Pie"	Don McLean
16:24	29 January	"American Pie"	Don McLean
16:25	5 February	"American Pie"	Don McLean
16:26	12 February	"American Pie"	Don McLean
17:1	19 February	"American Pie"	Don McLean
17:2	26 February	"Love Me, Love Me Love"	Frank Mills
17:3	4 March	"Love Me, Love Me Love"	Frank Mills
17:4	11 March	"Without You"	Nilsson
17:5	18 March	"Down by the Lazy River"	The Osmonds
17:6	25 March	"Down by the Lazy River"	The Osmonds
17:7	1 April	"Cotton Jenny"	Anne Murray
17:8	8 April	"Heart of Gold"	Neil Young
17:9	15 April	"Puppy Love"	Donny Osmond
17:10	22 April	"Puppy Love"	Donny Osmond
17:11	29 April	"Puppy Love"	Donny Osmond
17:12	6 May	"A Horse with No Name"	America
17:13	13 May	"Heart of Gold"	Neil Young
17:14	20 May	"The First Time Ever I Saw Your Face"	Roberta Flack
17:15	27 May	"The First Time Ever I Saw Your Face"	Roberta Flack
17:16	3 June	"The First Time Ever I Saw Your Face"	Roberta Flack
17:17	10 June	"Amazing Grace"	Royal Scots Dragoon Guards
17:18	17 June	"Amazing Grace"	Royal Scots Dragoon Guards
17:19	24 June	"Amazing Grace"	Royal Scots Dragoon Guards
17:20	1 July	"Nice to Be with You"	Gallery
17:21	8 July	"Nice to Be with You"	Gallery
17:22	15 July	"Troglodyte"	Jimmy Castor
17:23	22 July	"Troglodyte"	Jimmy Castor
17:24	29 July	"Too Late to Turn Back Now"	Cornelius Brothers & Sister Rose
17:25	5 August	"Too Late to Turn Back Now"	Cornelius Brothers & Sister Rose
17:26	12 August	"Daddy Don't You Walk So Fast"	Wayne Newton
18:1	19 August	"Alone Again (Naturally)"	Gilbert O'Sullivan
18:2	26 August	"Alone Again (Naturally)"	Gilbert O'Sullivan
18:3	2 September	"Alone Again (Naturally)"	Gilbert O'Sullivan
18:4	9 September	"Brandy (You're a Fine Girl)"	Looking Glass
18:5	16 September	"Long Cool Woman in a Black Dress"	The Hollies
18:6	23 September	"Long Cool Woman in a Black Dress"	The Hollies
18:7	30 September	"Black and White"	Three Dog Night
18:8	7 October	"Black and White"	Three Dog Night
18:9	14 October	"Black and White"	Three Dog Night
18:10	21 October	"My Ding-a-Ling"	Chuck Berry
18:11	28 October	"My Ding-a-Ling"	Chuck Berry
18:12	4 November	"My Ding-a-Ling"	Chuck Berry
18:13	11 November	"Nights in White Satin"	The Moody Blues
18:14	18 November	"Garden Party"	Rick Nelson
18:15	25 November	"I Can See Clearly Now"	Johnny Nash
18:16	2 December	"I Can See Clearly Now"	Johnny Nash
18:17	9 December	"I'd Love You to Want Me"	Lobo
18:18	16 December	"I Am Woman"	Helen Reddy
18:19	23 December	"I Am Woman"	Helen Reddy
18:20	30 December	"I Am Woman"	Helen Reddy

== See also ==
- 1972 in music
- List of Billboard Hot 100 number ones of 1972
- List of Cashbox Top 100 number-one singles of 1972
