= Prince Gideon Israel =

American musician (1948–1991)

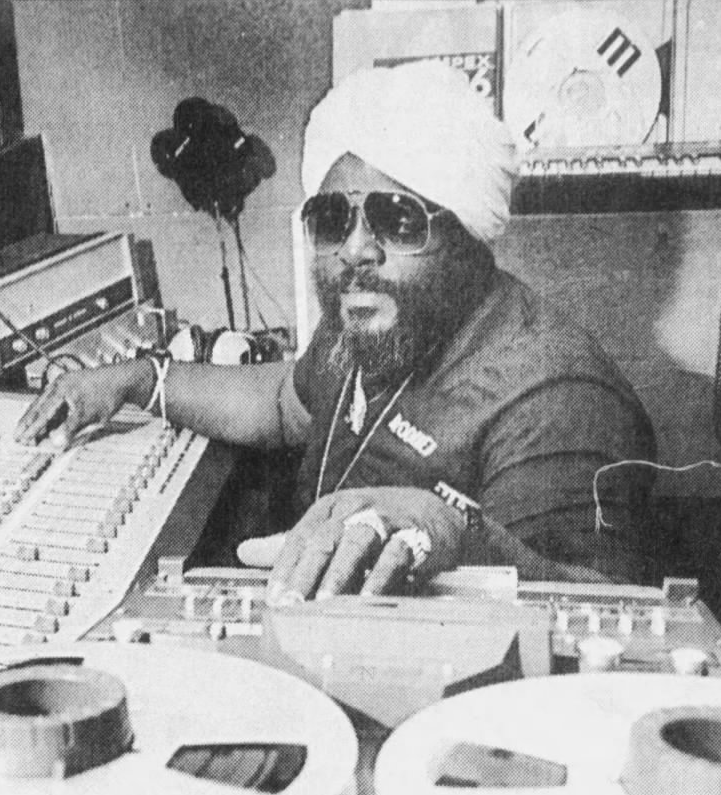
- Gideon Israel in the studio circa 1987.

Background information
- Born: Carter Cornelius; October 5, 1948
- Origin: Dania Beach, Florida
- Died: November 7, 1991 (aged 43)
- Genres: Soul, R&B, pop
- Occupation: Musician
- Instrument: Vocals
- Years active: 1970-1991
- Label: United Artists
- Formerly of: Cornelius Brothers & Sister Rose, Eddie Cornelius

Prince Gideon Israel (or Prince Gideon, born Carter Cornelius, October 5, 1948 – November 7, 1991) was an American R&B musician. He originally performed with Cornelius Brothers & Sister Rose, then took the name Prince Gideon Israel after joining the Nation of Yahweh. He released four albums under this name, centred on religious devotion to Yahweh Ben Yahweh, before his sudden death from a heart attack in 1991.

== Early career ==
A native of Dania Beach, Florida, Cornelius was part of the musical group Cornelius Brothers & Sister Rose. A family-oriented musical group, the band was formed in 1971, in Dania, Florida, with Carter, his brother Eddie, and his sisters Billie Jo, and Rose. They released their self-titled album on the United Artists LP soon after forming. The album went to #29 on the LP Pop Chart and was a minor hit. The group also scored successes with the recordings "Treat Her Like A Lady", "Too Late To Turn Back Now", and "Don't Ever Be Lonely (A Poor Little Fool Like Me)." The release of "Don't Ever Be Lonely (A Poor Little Fool Like Me)", was the group's last hit. Other recordings by this group include, "I Just Can't Stop Loving Her", "Let Me Down Easy", "I'm So Glad (To Be Loved By You)", "Good Loving Don't Come Easy", "Got To Testify (Love)", "Big Time Lover", "I Keep Falling Deeper And Deeper", and "I'm Never Gonna Be Alone Anymore."

== Yahweh era ==
In 1976, he joined the Miami-based Nation of Yahweh religious sect, founded by Yahweh Ben Yahweh, and changed his name to Prince Gideon Israel. In 1982, he released Let My People Go, a four-song private press mini-album that explores Yahweh Black Hebrew Israelite theology. Gideon Israel then started a record label named Hangar 18 Records, based out of a custom recording studio he built at 5800 Mayo Street in Hollywood, Florida. His first release on Hangar 18 was 1988's Love Train LP, the full cover (back and front) of which depicts a train-shaped spaceship attacking stormy New York City with lasers while flying triumphantly to sunny Miami. Gideon Israel explained that this depicts God's rejection of New York City as the destination of the Son of God, and the decision to send him to Miami instead in the form of Yahweh ben Yahweh. That year he also released the album It's Your Fault. His final album was 1990's Smooth Sailing, which featured more polished production and was supposedly written "using the notes that Yahweh used to create the universe - seven notes of the scale, with not so many sharps and flats." Gideon Israel died suddenly of a heart attack on November 7, 1991.

== Discography ==
=== Albums ===
- Let My People Go – Yahweh Records – 1982
- Love Train – Hangar 18 Records – 1988
- It's Your Fault - Hangar 18 Records - 1988
- Smooth Sailing – Hangar 18 Records – 1990

=== 7" singles ===
- "Ain't That Loving You" H-18 HLYFLA-001 - 1987
- "Love Train" / "Use Me" H-18 HLYFLA 002 - 1988
- "Son of Man" H-18 HLYFA 771 - 1988
- "He's Alright With Me" / "He's Alright With Me" Hangar 18 HLYFLA777 – 1988
- "It's Your Fault" / "YBY" – Hangar 18 H-18-HLYFLA-3007 – 1988
- "Morning Star" H-18 HLYFLA-770 - 1989
- "Smooth Sailing" / "Smooth Sailing (Cruising)" – Hanger 18 – H-18-HLYFLA SM-777 – 1990
- "I'm So Lucky" / "Word Up" ISL-555 - 1990
- "Imagination" / "Imagination (Instrumental)" – Hangar 18 – H-18-HLY FLA IM-77 – 1991
