= Jungle Fever (disambiguation) =

Jungle Fever is a 1991 American film.

Jungle Fever or jungle fever may also refer to:

== Music ==
- Jungle Fever (album), a 1970 album by the Chakachas
  - "Jungle Fever" (song), a 1971 song by the Chakachas
- Jungle Fever (soundtrack), a 1991 soundtrack album by Stevie Wonder
- "Jungle Fever", a 1962 song by Geoff Goddard on the B-side of "Telstar"
- "Jungle Fever", a 2006 song by Pitbull featuring Wyclef Jean and Oobie from El Mariel
- Jungle Fever, a 2006 album by Blackface Naija

== Television ==
- "Jungle Fever" (SMBSS episode), an episode of The Super Mario Bros. Super Show!

== Other uses ==
- Dated term for tropical diseases, especially:
  - Malaria, a mosquito-borne infectious disease
- Jungle Fever, a 1982 video game published by PlayAround

== See also ==
- List of interracial topics
