= Love Me, Love Me =

Love Me, Love Me may refer to:

- "Luv Me, Luv Me", a 1998 song by Shaggy
- "Love Me, Love Me", charting single (Walker, Di Chiarra) by Dean Martin 1952, later included on album Hey, Brother, Pour the Wine 1964
- "Love Me, Love Me", song by Big Time Rush from Elevate
- "Love Me, Love Me", song by Korean group Winner from Our Twenty For
- Love Me Love Me (2026 film), an English-language Italian film directed by Roger Kumble

== See also ==
- "Love Me, Love Me Love", a 1971 song by Frank Mills
