= Michael the Black Man =

American political figure (born 1959)

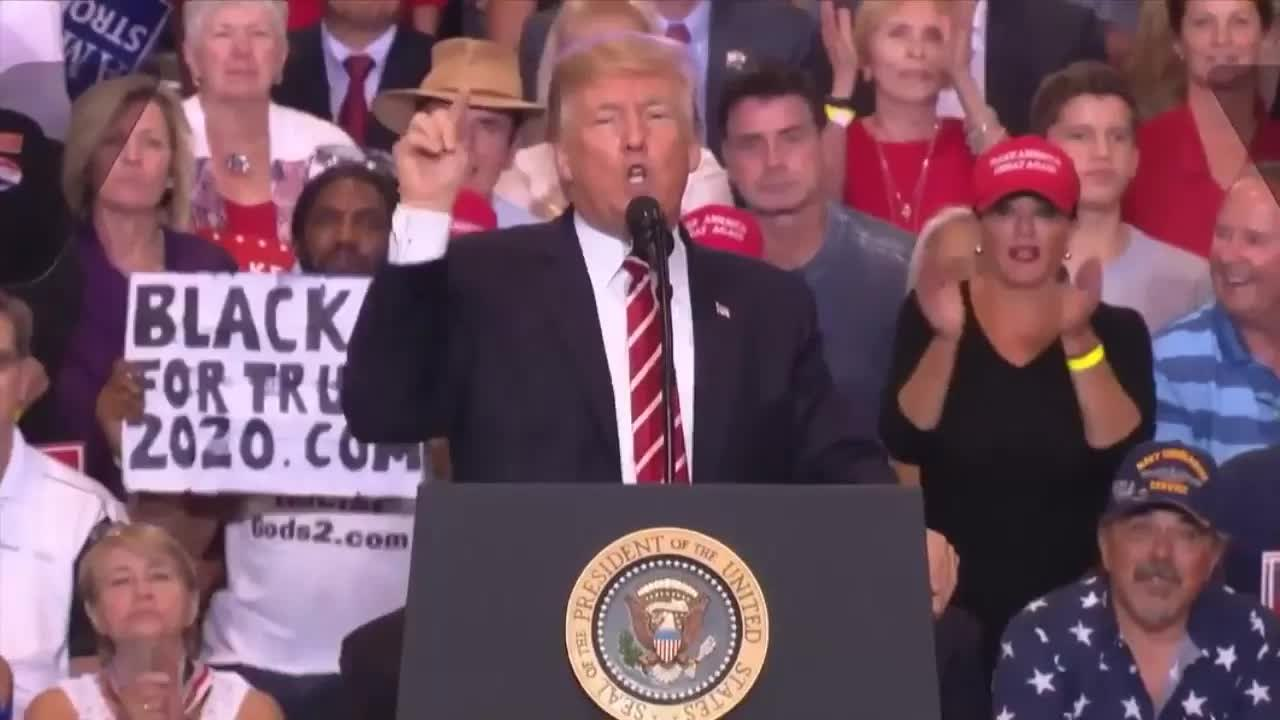
Donald Trump speaking at a rally in Phoenix, Arizona in August 2017. Michael the Black Man can be seen holding a sign that reads "Blacks for Trump 2020.com".

Maurice Woodside (born April 24, 1959), nicknamed Michael the Black Man, also known as Michael Symonette and Mikael Israel, is an American political figure from Miami, Florida. An outspoken supporter of U.S. President Donald Trump, he is known for appearances at Trump's rallies before and after the 2016 election, and he often sits behind Trump holding a "Blacks for Trump" sign at these rallies.

== Nation of Yahweh ==
Maurice Woodside has said he is related to a prime minister of the Bahamas, as well as being the great-grandson of the 18th-century pirate Blackbeard.

Woodside first met Nation of Yahweh cult leader Hulon Mitchell Jr., better known as Yahweh ben Yahweh, in 1980. Along with his brother, Ricardo, who joined the cult before he did, Woodside was reported to have played "a big role in the rise and fall of the Nation of Yahweh" (part of the Black Hebrew Israelites movement). His mother, Johnnie Simmons, was also a devout member of the cult. He later left the cult with his sister after his mother died.

He was one of 16 members of the Nation of Yahweh who was arrested and charged with one count of murder and one count of attempted murder in 1990. During the trial, Woodside's brother testified that Woodside had participated in the beating of one of the cult's murder victims, and had stuck a stick into the eye of another person. He was found not guilty of these charges by a Florida jury in 1992, but Yahweh was found guilty and sentenced to 20 years in prison. At the trial, Ricardo testified that he and Maurice attempted unsuccessfully to murder Eric Burke, a dissident member of Yahweh's cult, and that Maurice had helped to beat another cult member, Aston Green, unconscious.

== Later career and reinvention ==
Woodside became a fervent opponent of the Democratic Party, changed his name to Michael Symonette, and began a career as a musician. He later started a radio station, BOSS 104.1 FM, before reinventing himself as "Michael the Black Man". He briefly came to media attention in September 2008, when he accused Oprah Winfrey of being the devil, and Barack Obama of being endorsed by the Ku Klux Klan, at one of Obama's speeches in Coral Gables, Florida.

In 2012, he spoke to the audience at a Rick Santorum campaign rally in Coral Springs, Florida, where he said that the Democrats were "the worst thing that ever happened to the black man". As of August 2017, he runs multiple websites, including Gods2.com, which he frequently promotes on his shirt at Trump rallies. He has participated in efforts by Miami mayor Tomás Regalado to help homeless veterans.

In the fall of 2018, Woodside filed for bankruptcy, stating that he had no money left and that banks were after four properties he owned worth $2.9 million, but was denied due to having filed for bankruptcy eight times before, during which he had "never performed his obligations as a debtor". In response, Woodside accused the judge in his case of racial bias and of targeting him because of his support for Donald Trump.

In a 2020 interview with Mother Jones, Woodside credited Yahweh Ben Yahweh for his opposition to the Democratic Party.

In 2022, a man was shot at a mansion owned by 'Boss Group Ministries', which listed Woodside as its president. Woodside, who had bought the mansion in 2014 and lived there with several others, regularly held parties there with the stated goal of promoting "racial harmony", and where local celebrities were frequently sighted. During a party a fight broke out between two men, one of whom was injured and another eventually died, and two others were injured as well. Woodside stated he had not been present that evening, nor had he planned any party that day.
