= List of Cash Box Top 100 number-one singles of 1972 =

These are the singles that reached number one on the Top 100 Singles chart in 1972 as published in Cash Box magazine.

Issue date	Song	Artist
January 1	"Got to Be There"	Michael Jackson
January 8	"American Pie"	Don McLean
January 15	"Brand New Key"	Melanie
January 22	"American Pie"	Don McLean
January 29	"American Pie"	Don McLean
February 5	"American Pie"	Don McLean
February 12	"Let's Stay Together"	Al Green
February 19	"Let's Stay Together"	Al Green
February 26	"Precious and Few"	Climax
March 4	"Without You"	Nilsson
March 11	"Without You"	Nilsson
March 18	"Heart of Gold"	Neil Young
March 25	"A Horse with No Name"	America
April 1	"A Horse with No Name"	America
April 8	"A Horse with No Name"	America
April 15	"Rockin Robin"	Michael Jackson
April 22	"The First Time Ever I Saw Your Face"	Roberta Flack
April 29	"The First Time Ever I Saw Your Face"	Roberta Flack
May 6	"The First Time Ever I Saw Your Face"	Roberta Flack
May 13	"The First Time Ever I Saw Your Face"	Roberta Flack
May 20	"I'll Take You There"	The Staple Singers
May 27	"I'll Take You There"	The Staple Singers
June 3	"Oh Girl"	The Chi-Lites
June 10	"The Candy Man"	Sammy Davis, Jr.
June 17	"Sylvia's Mother"	Dr. Hook & The Medicine Show
June 24	"Nice to Be with You"	Gallery
July 1	"Song Sung Blue"	Neil Diamond
July 8	"Outa-Space"	Billy Preston
July 15	"Lean on Me"	Bill Withers
July 22	"Lean on Me"	Bill Withers
July 29	"Too Late to Turn Back Now"	Cornelius Brothers & Sister Rose
August 5	"Daddy Don't You Walk So Fast"	Wayne Newton
August 12	"Alone Again (Naturally)"	Gilbert O'Sullivan
August 19	"Alone Again (Naturally)"	Gilbert O'Sullivan
August 26	"Alone Again (Naturally)"	Gilbert O'Sullivan
September 2	"Brandy (You're a Fine Girl)"	Looking Glass
September 9	"I'm Still in Love with You"	Al Green
September 16	"Long Cool Woman in a Black Dress"	The Hollies
September 23	"Back Stabbers"	The O'Jays
September 30	"Black and White"	Three Dog Night
October 7	"Baby, Don't Get Hooked on Me"	Mac Davis
October 14	"Everybody Plays the Fool"	Main Ingredient
October 21	"My Ding-a-Ling"	Chuck Berry
October 28	"My Ding-a-Ling"	Chuck Berry
November 4	"Nights in White Satin"	The Moody Blues
November 11	"Burning Love"	Elvis Presley
November 18	"I Can See Clearly Now"	Johnny Nash
November 25	"I'll Be Around"	The Spinners
December 2	"I'd Love You to Want Me"	Lobo
December 9	"Papa Was a Rollin' Stone"	The Temptations
December 16	"I Am Woman"	Helen Reddy
December 23	"Me and Mrs. Jones"	Billy Paul
December 30	"Me and Mrs. Jones"	Billy Paul

== See also ==
- 1972 in music
- List of Hot 100 number-one singles of 1972 (U.S.)
