= List of Canadian number-one albums of 1972 =

This article lists the Canadian number-one albums of 1972. The chart was compiled and published by RPM every Saturday.

The untitled album that became later known as Led Zeppelin IV was listed as New Led Zeppelin Album. Three acts held the top position in the albums and singles charts simultaneously: Don McLean for four weeks from January 29 – February 19, Neil Young on April 8 and America on May 6.

(Entries with dates marked thus* are not presently on record at Library and Archives Canada and were inferred from the following week's listing. )

Issue date	Album	Artist
January 8	Led Zeppelin IV	Led Zeppelin
January 15	Led Zeppelin IV	Led Zeppelin
January 22*	Led Zeppelin IV	Led Zeppelin
January 29	American Pie	Don McLean
February 5	American Pie	Don McLean
February 12	American Pie	Don McLean
February 19	American Pie	Don McLean
February 26	American Pie	Don McLean
March 4	American Pie	Don McLean
March 11	American Pie	Don McLean
March 18	American Pie	Don McLean
March 25	American Pie	Don McLean
April 1	Harvest	Neil Young
April 8	Harvest	Neil Young
April 15	Don Quixote	Gordon Lightfoot
April 22	America	America
April 29	America	America
May 6	America	America
May 13*	America	America
May 20*	America	America
May 27	America	America
June 3	America	America
June 10	Annie	Anne Murray
June 17	Annie	Anne Murray
June 24	Thick as a Brick	Jethro Tull
July 1	Exile on Main St.	The Rolling Stones
July 8	Exile on Main St.	The Rolling Stones
July 15	Exile on Main St.	The Rolling Stones
July 22	Exile on Main St.	The Rolling Stones
July 29	Exile on Main St.	The Rolling Stones
August 5	Exile on Main St.	The Rolling Stones
August 12	School's Out	Alice Cooper
August 19	School's Out	Alice Cooper
August 26	School's Out	Alice Cooper
September 2	School's Out	Alice Cooper
September 9	Chicago V	Chicago
September 16	Chicago V	Chicago
September 23	Chicago V	Chicago
September 30	Chicago V	Chicago
October 7	Chicago V	Chicago
October 14	Never a Dull Moment	Rod Stewart
October 21	Never a Dull Moment	Rod Stewart
October 28	Never a Dull Moment	Rod Stewart
November 4	Never a Dull Moment	Rod Stewart
November 11	Catch Bull at Four	Cat Stevens
November 18	Catch Bull at Four	Cat Stevens
November 25	Old Dan's Records	Gordon Lightfoot
December 2	Old Dan's Records	Gordon Lightfoot
December 9	Old Dan's Records	Gordon Lightfoot
December 16	Living in the Past	Jethro Tull
December 23	Living in the Past	Jethro Tull
December 30	Rhymes & Reasons	Carole King

== See also ==
- 1972 in music
- RPM number-one hits of 1972
