= I've Got Everything =

Studio album by Henry Lee Summer
- Released: 1989
- Studio: Henry's House of Noise
- Genre: Heartland rock, roots rock, pop
- Label: CBS
- Producer: Henry Lee Summer

Henry Lee Summer chronology
| Henry Lee Summer (1988) | I've Got Everything (1989) | Way Past Midnight (1991) |

I've Got Everything is an album by the American musician Henry Lee Summer, released in 1989. The first single was "Hey Baby". Summer supported the album by opening for Eddie Money and then the Doobie Brothers on North American tours. The album peaked at No. 78 on the Billboard 200. It sold more than 400,000 copies in its first six months of release.

== Production ==
Produced by Summer, the album was recorded over four and half months at his Broad Ripple Village, Indianapolis, home, which was dubbed Henry's House of Noise; he preferred that the songs be recorded in one take, and would break to play basketball with his band if a song was proving difficult to record. The album title refers to Summer's attempts to convince his label that he could record a commercial success at his house. He decided to leave in the many recording and musical mistakes. Graham Maby played bass on the album; many of the other musicians, including Lisa Germano, were pulled from John Cougar Mellencamp's regular band. Summer wrote most of the songs while touring in support of his previous album, and was influenced primarily by Otis Redding and Elvis Presley. "Don't Leave Me" includes a musical quote from the Beatles' "A Day in the Life". "Treat Her Like a Lady" is a cover of the Cornelius Brothers & Sister Rose song, which Summer's label asked him to record. "Louie Louie Louie" is a song meant to accompany a dance Summer invented for "uncoordinated" people. "My Louisa" had been a Summer live staple for four years.

== Critical reception ==
Professional ratings
Review scores
| Source | Rating |
|---|---|
| AllMusic | 3/5 stars |
| The Cincinnati Post | 3.5/5 stars |

The Washington Post opined that "Summer, a passable Top 40 guitarist, fancies himself a soul singer in the Sam & Dave tradition; and while his dedication is admirable ... his new album, I've Got Everything, is not exactly persuasive." The Toronto Star called the album "a deliberately dirty affair" and praised Summer for capturing "the best possible readings of predictable but genuine heartland rock 'n' roll." The Whig-Standard said that "Summer writes eminently capable songs even if ... they're gone out of your mind an hour later."

The Daily Illini advised, "Beware of heinous vocals and inexplicable gospel choruses." The Cincinnati Post praised the "loose, funky rockers". The Commercial Appeal admired the up-tempo tracks, but noted that Summer "lacks the delivery or raw skills" to make the serious songs successful. The Courier Journal opined that "the first side is a marvel–six superbly crafted and well-executed pop songs". The Poughkeepsie Journal labeled the album "vintage heartland rock–ringing guitars, simple beats and chords, and no pretense." The Boston Globe said that Summer "slides easily between his guitar and keyboards on this spirited recording".

AllMusic called I've Got Everything "his best, a two-fisted roots rock smorgasbord without a whiff of pretension... [but] a little too glossy and a smidge too sappy".

== Track listing ==
| No. | Title | Length |
|---|---|---|
| 1. | "Treat Her Like a Lady" |
| 2. | "Roll Me" |
| 3. | "My Turn Train" |
| 4. | "Hey Baby" |
| 5. | "My Louisa" |
| 6. | "Louie Louie Louie" |
| 7. | "Don't Leave Me" |
| 8. | "Something Is Missing" |
| 9. | "Got No Money" |
| 10. | "I've Got Everything" |
| 11. | "Close Enough for Me" |
| 12. | "What's a Poor Boy to Do" |
