= List of Best Selling Soul Singles number ones of 1972 =

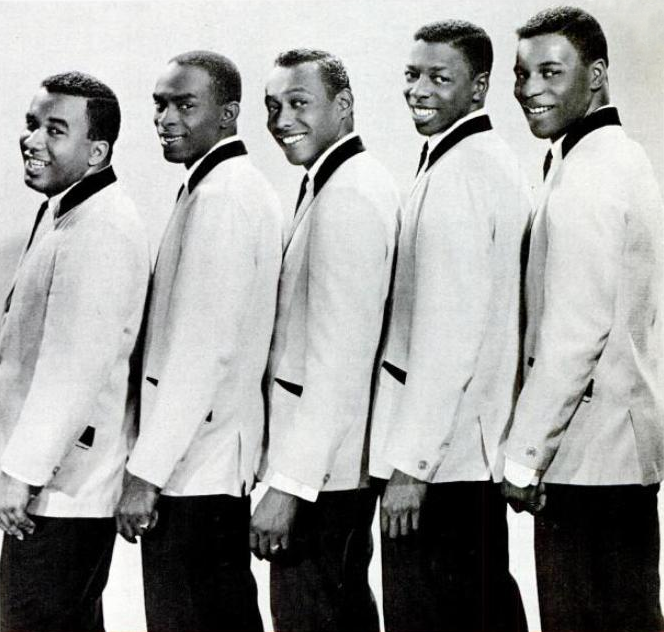
The Spinners topped the chart for the first time with "I'll Be Around".

Billboard published a weekly chart in 1972 ranking the top-performing singles in the United States in soul music and related African American-oriented music genres; the chart has undergone various name changes over the decades to reflect the evolution of such genres and since 2005 has been published as Hot R&B/Hip-Hop Songs. In 1972, it was published under the title Best Selling Soul Singles, and 21 different singles topped the chart.

In the issue of Billboard dated January 1, Sly and the Family Stone were at number one with "Family Affair", the song's fifth week in the top spot. The following week, it was replaced by Al Green's "Let's Stay Together", which went on to spend nine weeks at number one, making it the longest-running chart-topper of the year and the song with the longest uninterrupted run atop the chart since 1965. "Let's Stay Together" was the first number one for Green, and he achieved two more soul chart-toppers by the end of the year, spending two weeks atop the chart in August with "I'm Still in Love with You" and one in December with "You Ought to Be with Me". Green was one of only two acts with more than one chart-topping single during the year, and his total of 12 weeks at number one was more than twice that achieved by any other act.

As well as Al Green, several other acts topped the chart for the first time in 1972. Beginning with the issue of Billboard dated July 8, Luther Ingram spent four weeks in the top spot with his first number one, "(If Loving You Is Wrong) I Don't Want to Be Right". Although it was a multi-million seller, it proved to be his only chart-topping single. It was replaced at number one by "Where Is the Love" by Roberta Flack and Donny Hathaway, which was the first R&B number one for both singers. Flack's previous single, "The First Time Ever I Saw Your Face", topped the all-genre Hot 100 chart for six weeks and was the year's biggest-selling single, but on the soul chart it only climbed as high as number 4. The Dramatics, the Staple Singers, Bobby Womack, Bill Withers, Billy Preston, the O'Jays, the Spinners, Harold Melvin & the Blue Notes and Billy Paul also gained the first number ones of their respective careers in 1972. Paul's "Me and Mrs. Jones" was the year's final number one, reaching the top spot in the issue of Billboard dated December 9 and staying there for the remainder of the year. It also topped the Hot 100, as did five of 1972's other soul number ones: "Family Affair", "Let's Stay Together", "I'll Take You There" by the Staple Singers, "Oh Girl" by the Chi-Lites and "Lean on Me" by Bill Withers.

== Chart history ==
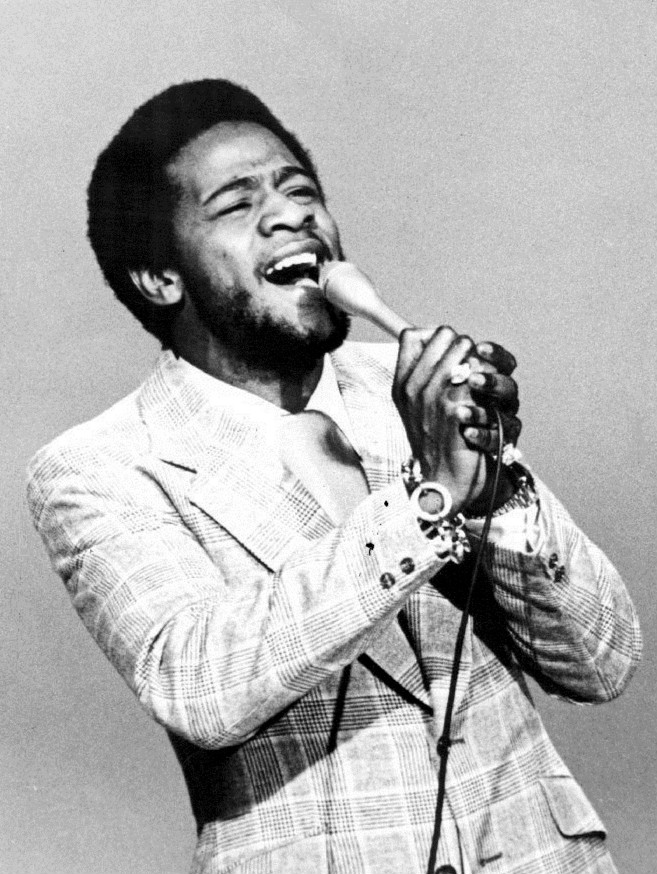
Al Green had the year's longest-running number one with "Let's Stay Together" in addition to two other number ones: "I'm Still in Love with You" and "You Ought to Be with Me".

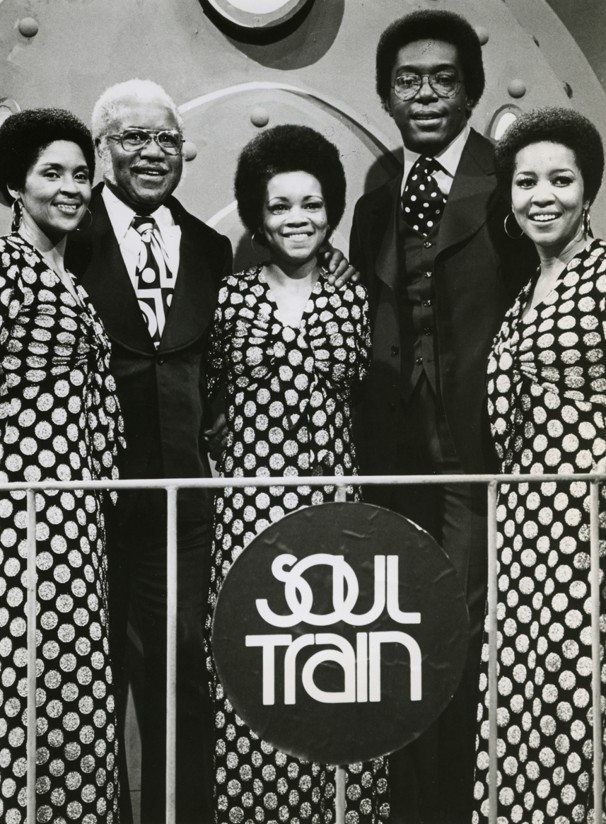
The Staple Singers, pictured with TV host Don Cornelius (second right), topped the chart with "I'll Take You There".

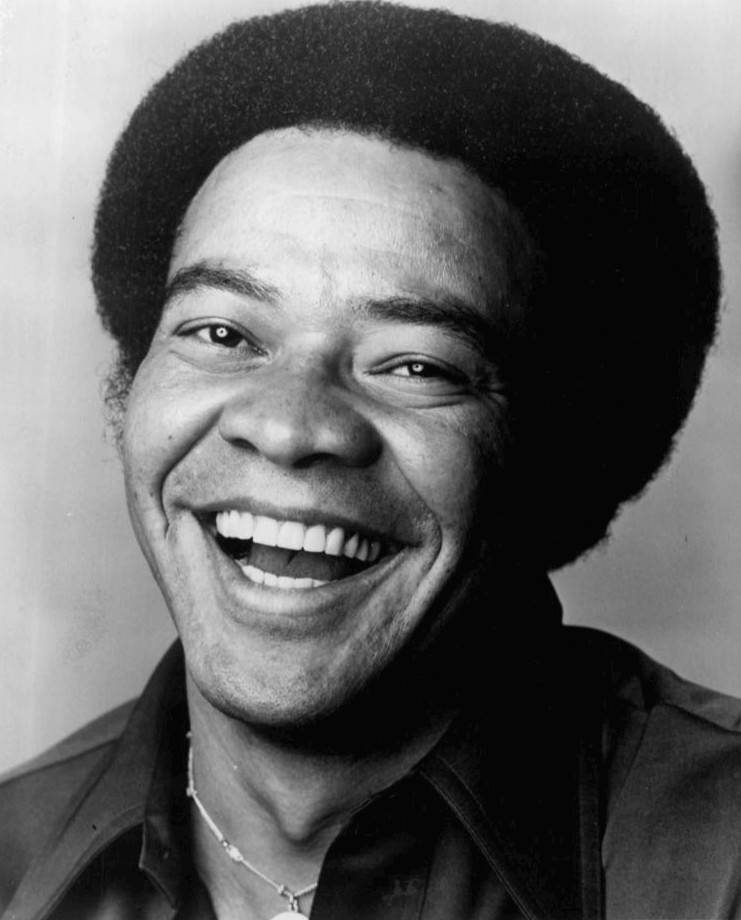
Bill Withers topped the chart with "Lean on Me".

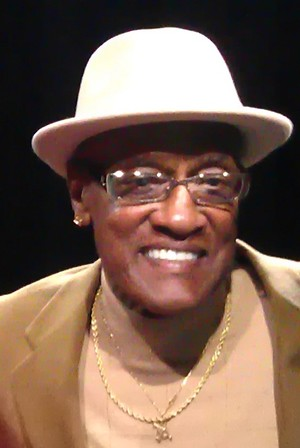
Billy Paul (pictured in later life) ended the year at number one with "Me and Mrs. Jones".

Key
†	Indicates number 1 on Billboard's year-end soul chart

Chart history
Issue date	Title	Artist(s)	Ref.
January 1	"Family Affair"	Sly and the Family Stone	
January 8	"Let's Stay Together" †	Al Green	
January 15	"Let's Stay Together" †	Al Green	
January 22	"Let's Stay Together" †	Al Green	
January 29	"Let's Stay Together" †	Al Green	
February 5	"Let's Stay Together" †	Al Green	
February 12	"Let's Stay Together" †	Al Green	
February 19	"Let's Stay Together" †	Al Green	
February 26	"Let's Stay Together" †	Al Green	
March 4	"Let's Stay Together" †	Al Green	
March 11	"Talkin' Loud and Sayin' Nothing (Pt. 1)"	James Brown	
March 18	"I Gotcha"	Joe Tex	
March 25	"In the Rain"	The Dramatics	
April 1	"In the Rain"	The Dramatics	
April 8	"In the Rain"	The Dramatics	
April 15	"In the Rain"	The Dramatics	
April 22	"Day Dreaming"	Aretha Franklin	
April 29	"Day Dreaming"	Aretha Franklin	
May 6	"I'll Take You There"	The Staple Singers	
May 13	"I'll Take You There"	The Staple Singers	
May 20	"I'll Take You There"	The Staple Singers	
May 27	"I'll Take You There"	The Staple Singers	
June 3	"Oh Girl"	The Chi-Lites	
June 10	"Oh Girl"	The Chi-Lites	
June 17	"Woman's Gotta Have It"	Bobby Womack	
June 24	"Lean On Me"	Bill Withers	
July 1	"Outa-Space"	Billy Preston	
July 8	"(If Loving You Is Wrong) I Don't Want to Be Right"	Luther Ingram	
July 15	"(If Loving You Is Wrong) I Don't Want to Be Right"	Luther Ingram	
July 22	"(If Loving You Is Wrong) I Don't Want to Be Right"	Luther Ingram	
July 29	"(If Loving You Is Wrong) I Don't Want to Be Right"	Luther Ingram	
August 5	"Where Is the Love"	Roberta Flack and Donny Hathaway	
August 12	"I'm Still in Love With You"	Al Green	
August 19	"I'm Still in Love With You"	Al Green	
August 26	"Power of Love"	Joe Simon	
September 2	"Power of Love"	Joe Simon	
September 9	"Back Stabbers"	The O'Jays	
September 16	"Get On the Good Foot"	James Brown	
September 23	"Get On the Good Foot"	James Brown	
September 30	"Get On the Good Foot"	James Brown	
October 7	"Get On the Good Foot"	James Brown	
October 14	"I'll Be Around"	The Spinners	
October 21	"I'll Be Around"	The Spinners	
October 28	"I'll Be Around"	The Spinners	
November 4	"I'll Be Around"	The Spinners	
November 11	"I'll Be Around"	The Spinners	
November 18	"If You Don't Know Me by Now"	Harold Melvin & the Blue Notes	
November 25	"If You Don't Know Me by Now"	Harold Melvin & the Blue Notes	
December 2	"You Ought to Be With Me"	Al Green	
December 9	"Me and Mrs. Jones"	Billy Paul	
December 16	"Me and Mrs. Jones"	Billy Paul	
December 23	"Me and Mrs. Jones"	Billy Paul	
December 30	"Me and Mrs. Jones"	Billy Paul	

== See also ==
- Billboard Year-End Best Selling Soul Singles of 1972
- List of Billboard Hot 100 number-one singles of 1972
