= Ralph DeLoach =

American football player (1957–2022)

No. 94
- Position: Defensive end

Personal information
- Born: January 13, 1957; Sacramento, California, U.S.
- Died: April 21, 2022 (aged 65)
- Listed height: 6 ft 5 in (1.96 m)
- Listed weight: 255 lb (116 kg)

Career information
- High school: Sacramento
- College: California
- NFL draft: 1979: 4th round, 109th overall pick

Career history
- Dallas Cowboys (1979)*; New York Jets (1980–1981); Green Bay Packers (1982)*
- * Offseason or practice squad member only

Awards and highlights
- First-team All-Pac-8 (1977)

Career NFL statistics
- Games played: 1
- Stats at Pro Football Reference

Ralph Alan DeLoach (January 13, 1957 – April 21, 2022) was an American professional football player who was a defensive end in the National Football League (NFL). He played one game for the New York Jets in 1981. He played college football for the California Golden Bears, and was drafted by the Dallas Cowboys in the fourth round of the 1979 NFL draft.

== Early life ==
DeLoach was born in Sacramento, California, on January 13, 1957. He attended Sacramento High School in his hometown. He accepted a football scholarship from the University of California, Berkeley; Robert Rozier was his roommate from 1977 to 1978. He was also teammates with Rozier on the California Golden Bears, along with Paul Jones, George Freitas, and Jim Breech.

As a junior DeLoach earned First-team All-Pacific-8 and All-West coast honors. He was subsequently named co-captain in 1978. During his senior year, he tied for the team lead with six quarterback sacks and twelve tackles for losses. DeLoach was honored as the Bears' most valuable defensive lineman in 1977–1979, having earlier been named its most improved lineman in 1976. He was given the award for outstanding senior from Northern California in 1978.

== Professional career ==
=== Dallas Cowboys ===
DeLoach was drafted by the Dallas Cowboys in the fourth round (109th overall selection) of the 1979 NFL draft. He was waived on August 21 without having played a game for the franchise.

=== New York Jets ===
The New York Jets first signed DeLoach as a free agent on May 7, 1980. On September 1, he was placed on the injured reserve list with a sprained ankle. He was waived by the franchise on August 31, 1981. He re-signed 58 days later providing depth on the defensive line.

DeLoach made his NFL debut with the Jets on November 8, 1981, at the age of 24, in a 41–14 win over the Baltimore Colts. It was the only NFL game he played in. Less than a week later, he was cut to make room to activate running back Freeman McNeil.

=== Green Bay Packers ===
On April 16, 1982, DeLoach was signed as a free agent by the Green Bay Packers. He was released before the start of the season.

== Later life ==
After retiring from professional football, DeLoach worked as a probation officer. He died on April 21, 2022, at the age of 65.
