= Eddie Cornelius =

- Occupations: Singer, songwriter, pastor
- Instrument: Vocals
- Labels: Audiograph, GB Records
- Formerly of: Cornelius Brothers & Sister Rose

Eddie Lee Cornelius Jr. is a gospel singer, songwriter, speaker and author.

He was a songwriter and lead singer for The Cornelius Brothers & Sister Rose, a 1970s soul R&B act. He wrote their biggest hits "Too Late To Turn Back Now" and "Treat Her Like A Lady".

In the 1980s, he released some solo albums on the Audiograph record label. In 1995, he became an ordained pastor and started the Blood of the Lamb ministries in South Florida.

In June 2020, he released his inspirational memoir, titled It's Not Too Late To Turn Back Now: Back To The Open Arms Of God, on Amazon.com.

== Credit as a song writer ==
His million sellers have been covered a multitude of artists.

- "Treat Her Like A Lady" has been covered by The Fleshtones, a Garage Rock group. and Alvin Youngblood Hart
- "Too Late To Turn Back Now" has been covered by artists such as Jackie Mittoo, Alton Ellis, The Chi Lites and even an obscure grunge psych exploito band called Beowulf in the early seventies.
- "Let Me Down Easy" has been covered by Marshall, Donovan, Broomfield

== Solo discography ==
=== Albums ===
- For You – Audiograph – AG 7794 (1982)
- My Hands Are Tied – Audiograph – AG 7785 (1982)

=== Singles ===
- "That's Love Making In Your Eyes" / "Hurry Up" – GB Records GB 001
