= Frank Mills (pianist) =

Canadian pianist and recording artist (born 1942)

- Born: 27 June 1942 (age 84); Montreal, Quebec, Canada
- Instrument: Piano

Frank Mills (born June 27, 1942) is a Canadian pianist and recording artist, best known for his solo instrumental hit "Music Box Dancer".

== Early life and education ==
Mills was born in Montreal, Quebec. He was raised in Verdun, Quebec, and started playing piano at the age of three. His family was musical, and his mother also played piano and his father sang tenor. By the time he was 17, both of his parents had died of cancer.

Mills attended McGill University for five years. At McGill, he initially studied engineering, but eventually switched to the Department of Music. He entertained his Delta Upsilon fraternity brothers with songs from ragtime to Bob Dylan (a new musician at the time). The fraternity piano had thumbtacks on every hammer and produced a unique sound.

== Career ==
In the late 1960s, Mills became a member of The Bells. He left the band in 1971 just before it had international success with the single "Stay Awhile".

Mills worked as a pianist for CBC Television and recorded his first solo album, Seven of My Songs, which produced the hit single "Love Me, Love Me Love". The song made its debut on the Canadian charts in December 1971, and early the following year, peaked at number one on the Canadian charts, number 46 on the Billboard Hot 100, and number eight on Billboard′s Easy Listening chart His 1972 cover of Ricky Nelson's "Poor Little Fool" made number 19 on the Canadian charts, but only reached number 106 in the US.

Mills released an album in 1974 that featured "Music Box Dancer", but it was not a hit initially. When he re-signed with executive Michael Hoppé at Polydor Records Canada in 1978, the label released a new song as a single, with "Music Box Dancer" on the B-side. The single was sent to easy listening radio stations in Canada, but a copy was sent in error to CFRA-AM, a pop station in Ottawa. The program director played the A-side and could not figure out why it had been sent to his station, so he played the B-side to see if the record was mistakenly marked. He liked "Music Box Dancer" and added it to his station's playlist, turning the record into a Canadian hit. Dave "50,000" Watts, an Ottawa Valley radio personality, gave the record extensive airplay on the station. The album went gold in Canada, which prompted Polydor in the US to release the album and single.

In Nashville, news producer Bob Parker at WNGE-TV began playing the song over the closing credits of the newscast. Nashville DJs quickly gave the song airplay, and both the single and album were hits. The million-selling (gold-certified) single reached number three on the Billboard Hot 100 in the spring of 1979, as well as number four on the Billboard Easy Listening chart, while the album reached number 21 on the Billboard Top Album chart and also went gold. Polydor awarded a gold record to TV station WNGE for breaking the single in the US.

"Music Box Dancer" was Mills' only US top-40 pop hit. The follow-up, another piano instrumental, "Peter Piper", peaked at number 48 on the Billboard Hot 100, but became a top-10 hit on the Billboard Adult Contemporary chart. Mills managed one final Adult Contemporary chart entry, "Happy Song", which peaked at number 41 at the beginning of 1981.

Mills won two Juno Awards in 1980 for "Peter Piper", one for Composer of the Year and one for Instrumental Artist of the Year. He again won in the latter category in 1981.

He continued to release albums until the early 1990s. In 2010, he traveled on a Christmas tour with Canadian singer Rita MacNeil. Mills and MacNeil toured again in November–December 2012.

== Film and television appearances ==
"Music Box Dancer" was the theme song of the local Los Angeles CBS half-hour TV documentary show 2 on the Town from 1979 through the early 1980s.

"Music Box Dancer" has been heard on an episode of The Simpsons and in the Kill Bill movies. It was used as the theme tune to the BBC2 golf programme, Around with Alliss, and also as a popular track on the BBC1 trade test (testcard) transmissions. Other Frank Mills tracks, including "From a Sidewalk Cafe", were used on BBC1 and BBC2 in the 1970s and 1980s during testcard, ceefax, and intervals between programmes.

In the late 1970s and early 1980s, Mills made a number of appearances on the annual Telemiracle telethons broadcast from Saskatoon and Regina, Saskatchewan.

== Discography ==
=== Studio albums ===
- Seven Of My Songs Plus Some Others - 1972
- Cover of Reflections Of My Childhood - 1972
- The Poet and I - Unknown
- Le Grand Orchestre De Frank Mills - 1974
- Look At Me Real - 1976
- Music Box Dancer - 1979
- Sunday Morning Suite - 1979
- Bailarin De Cajita Musical - 1979
- The Frank Mills Album - 1980
- Prelude To Romance - 1981
- Rondo - 1982
- A Special Christmas - 1983
- Traveler - 1985
- Transitions - 1985
- My Piano - 1988
- Gather Round The Piano - 1991
- Christmas With Frank Mills And Friends - 1992
- Homeward - 1993
- A Traditional Christmas - 1994
- Goodnight My Love - 1996
- Goes To The Movies - 1997
- The Spirit of Christmas (with Rita MacNeil) - 2010

=== Compilation albums ===
- Best Collection - 1974
- Sunday Morning Suite - 1979
- Best Collection - 1982
- The Greatest Frank Mills - 1983
- Music Box Dancer - 1983
- The Magic Of Frank Mills - 1984
- Over 60 Minutes With... Frank Mills - 1987
- The Twentieth Anniversary - Together Through The Years - 1989
- 25 Year's Of Piano Magic - 1996
- Music Box Dancer - 2000
- The Very Best Of Frank Mills - 2002
- Collection - 2003
- A Very Special Christmas - 2005
- Frank Mills = フランク・ミルズ* – Best Selection = ベスト・セレクション (japanese edition) - 2013
- The Frank Mills Story - 2019
