= Music Box Dancer =

Single by Frank Mills

from the album Music Box Dancer
- B-side: "The Poet and I"
- Released: 1978
- Recorded: 1974
- Genre: Easy listening; soft rock
- Length: 3:15
- Label: Polydor
- Songwriter: Frank Mills
- Producer: Frank Mills

Frank Mills singles chronology
"Love Me, Love Me Love" (1972)	"Music Box Dancer" (1978)	"Peter Piper" (1979)

Audio sample
- "Music Box Dancer": file; help

"Music Box Dancer" is an instrumental piece by Canadian musician Frank Mills that was an international hit in the late 1970s. It features an arpeggiated piano theme in C-sharp major designed to resemble a music box, accompanied by other instruments playing a counterpoint melody as well as a wordless chorus. Most modern piano music sheets have the song in the key of C major.

Mills wrote and recorded "Music Box Dancer" in 1974, but it did not become a single until 1978. It reached #3 on the Canadian Adult Contemporary chart and #47 on the Canadian pop chart, and after being released in the United States in January 1979, it reached #3 on the Billboard Hot 100. The single also reached #14 on the Australian Singles Chart (Kent Music Report), #1 in Switzerland, and the top ten of many European and Asian pop music charts. It additionally peaked at #4 on the US Cash Box Top 100.

== History ==
In 1974, Mills released an album that featured "Music Box Dancer", but it was not initially a hit. When he re-signed with Polydor Records Canada in 1978, the label released the song "The Poet And I" as a single, with "Music Box Dancer" on the B-side.

The song's success at CFRA was swift. "Music Box Dancer" premiered on CFRA's top 30 chart on May 5, 1978; by June 30, it was the #1 song on the station's playlist. "Music Box Dancer" also began picking up play on other Canadian stations around this time, becoming a nationwide hit. Mills's album went gold in Canada, which, after several months, prompted Polydor in the US to release the album and single with the B-side "The Poet and I".

The million-selling Gold-certified single reached #3 on the Billboard Hot 100 in the spring of 1979 as well as #4 on the Billboard Easy Listening chart, while the album reached #21 on the Billboard Top Album chart and also went gold. Around that time, Nashville, Tennessee television station WNGE used Music Box Dancer as its news theme;

It was Mills's only U.S. Top 40 pop hit; the follow-up, another piano instrumental titled "Peter Piper", peaked at #48 on the Billboard Hot 100, although it was a popular Top 10 hit on the Billboard Adult Contemporary chart. Mills managed one final Adult Contemporary chart entry, "Happy Song", which peaked at #41 at the beginning of 1981.

Mills also released a version of Ricky Nelson's "Poor Little Fool" with substantial airplay in Ontario during the 1970s and 1980s, reaching number 19 on the Canadian Top 100 charts.

== Chart performance ==
=== Weekly singles charts ===
Chart (1978–1979)	Peak position
Australia (Kent Music Report)	14
Canada RPM Adult Contemporary	3
Canada RPM Top Singles	47
Ireland (IRMA)	15
New Zealand	2
Switzerland	1
US Billboard Hot 100	3
US Billboard Adult Contemporary	4
US Cash Box Top 100	2

=== Year-end charts ===
Chart (1979)	Rank
Australia (Kent Music Report)	60
New Zealand	29
Switzerland	6
US Billboard Hot 100	49
US Cash Box Top 100	28

== Cover versions ==
"Music Box Dancer" has been recorded by a variety of artists over the years, including pianists such as Floyd Cramer, Richard Clayderman, Roger Williams, and Eric Robertson, as well as orchestral groups like James Last and the 101 Strings Orchestra. Bandleader Ray Conniff recorded a vocal version with added lyrics on his 1979 album I Will Survive. Germany's Roberto Delgado recorded a calypso arrangement, and additional international versions have appeared, including an accordion rendition released in Sweden and a techno adaptation by the band PePe. The song was also recorded by Enormous Richard for the Pravda Records compilation 20 More Explosive Fantastic Rockin' Mega Smash Hit Explosions!. German singer Marion Maerz released a German-language vocal version, and The Wiggles covered the song on their 2006 video and album Racing to the Rainbow.

In 1980, Hong Kong singer Paula Tsui released a Cantonese-language version with new lyrics. The Ventures released a guitar-led cover version on their 1981 album Pops in Japan '81. The song is also often played by ice cream trucks in North America.

== In popular culture ==
- A segment of the song was used in The Simpsons episode "Bart Star", in a flashback to Homer's time as a high-school gymnast.
