= Willy Albimoor =

Background information
- Birth name: Willy Noël De Moor
- Also known as: Willy Albimoor; William Albimoor
- Born: December 28, 1924; Wevelgem, Belgium
- Died: December 11, 2004 (aged 79); Waremme, Belgium
- Occupations: Musician; composer
- Instrument: Piano

Willy Albimoor, sometimes also William Albimoor (pseudonym: Willy Noël De Moor; born on December 28, 1924, Wevelgem, Belgium – died on December 11, 2004, Borgworm, Belgium) was a Belgian composer and pianist. Sometimes he also used Bill Ador as a pseudonym.

== Biography ==
=== As pianist ===
De Moor began as a jazz pianist and was part of Roger Vanhaverbeke's trio since the 1950s. He collaborated with well-known jazz musicians such as Jack Sels, Etienne Verschueren, Herman Sandy, David Bee, Sadi Lallemand and Fud Candrix (especially in the period 1969–1971). He collaborated on Sadi Lallemand's big band album Swing a little and the 1958 album Jazz in little Belgium.

Furthermore, in the lighter genre, he accompanied such well-known names as Chuck Berry, Josephine Baker, Fud Leclerc, Johan Verminnen and many others.

He also accompanied all the revues of the Compagnie des Galeries at the Théâtre Royal des Galeries from its inception in 1953 until 1992.

=== As composer ===
Albimoor wrote music for Louis Neefs, Ann Christy, Etta Cameron, Will Tura, Bobbejaan Schoepen, The Cousins and many others. He also composed 4 mini concertos for piano and orchestra. These works were performed regularly between 1972 and 1978 by Caravelli's orchestra during their tour of Japan.

Under the pseudonym Bill Ador, he wrote the song Jungle Fever for The Chakachas in 1971. It became his biggest hit, the song reaching eighth place on the US Billboard Hot 100 in 1972.

Albimoor had been a member of the authors' association SABAM since 1948 and received a recognition award from the association in 1977 for his work.
