= Robert Rozier =

US murderer and gridiron-football player (born 1955)

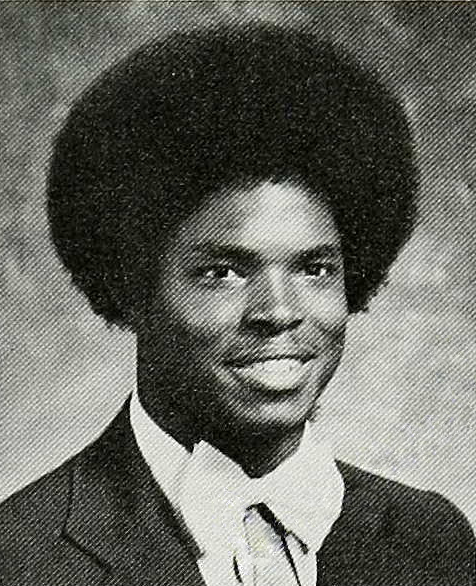
- Rozier in his 1974 high-school yearbook
- Born: Robert Earnest Rozier Jr. July 28, 1955 (age 71); Anchorage, Territory of Alaska, U.S.
- Other names: Bob Rozier; Neariah Israel; Robert Rameses
- Criminal penalty: 10 years imprisonment; Murder × 4 (1986); Imprisoned for 25–life; Check bouncing (2001)
- Criminal status: Imprisoned at Mule Creek State Prison
- Children: Two
- Football career

No. 75, 53
- Position: Defensive end

Personal information
- Listed height: 6 ft 3 in (1.91 m)
- Listed weight: 240 lb (109 kg)

Career information
- High school: Cordova (Rancho Cordova, CA)
- College: Grays Harbor; California
- NFL draft: 1979: 9th round, 228th overall pick

Career history
- St. Louis Cardinals (1979); Hamilton Tiger-Cats (1980); Saskatchewan Roughriders (1980); Oakland Raiders (1981)

Career NFL statistics
- Games played: 6
- Stats at Pro Football Reference

Robert Earnest Rozier Jr. (born July 28, 1955) is an American murderer and former professional defensive end in gridiron football.

Born in Alaska and raised in California, Rozier was a high-school and collegiate athlete before briefly playing professional gridiron football. In the 1980s, he joined the Nation of Yahweh, and by Halloween 1986 had killed at least four people on behalf of the religious group. Charged therefor, Rozier turned state's evidence against the group and its leader, and was sentenced to 22 years in prison; he was paroled after ten and put into witness protection. After Rozier was caught bouncing checks in 1999, he was sentenced to 25 years-to-life under California's three-strikes law in 2001.

== Personal life ==
Born on July 28, 1955, in Anchorage, Alaska Territory, Robert Earnest Rozier Jr. was a United States Air Force brat who grew up in California.

At Cordova High School in Rancho Cordova, California, he scored a 1.32 grade point average and did not receive his high school diploma. Rozier was later a student at both Grays Harbor College in Aberdeen, Washington, and the University of California, Berkeley (majoring in African-American studies), but graduated from neither school.

By 1999, Rozier was living in Cameron Park, California, owned an auto detailing business in Sacramento, worked in web design, and had raised two children.

== Athletics ==
=== School ===
At Cordova High, Rozier was an athletic wunderkind: the teen played American football as a defensive end and was "all-league, all-conference, all-Northern California." The high-schooler could also high jump six feet seven inches (2.01 m), vertical jump ten feet (3.0 m), sprint the 40-yard dash in 4.7 seconds, and bench press 375 pounds (170 kg). When he was passed over to play college football for lacking his Cordova High diploma, he enrolled at Grays Harbor College, where he played from 1975–1976. From there, he was recruited by University of California, Berkeley's football coach, Mike White. At California, team captain Ralph DeLoach described Rozier as "the best athlete on the team", playing 1977–1978.

=== Professional ===
The 6-foot-3-inch (1.91 m) and 240-pound (110 kg) Bob Rozier was drafted by the St. Louis Cardinals in the ninth round of the 1979 NFL draft (228th overall). A defensive end, Rozier played as number 75 for six games in 1979, starting for none of them. Rozier's professional sports career in the U.S. was derailed by "allegations of drug use and petty crime."

Rozier briefly moved on to the Canadian Football League (CFL); in the 1979 CFL season, he played defensive end for the Hamilton Tiger-Cats as number 53, and in the 1980 season, he played for the Saskatchewan Roughriders. In 1981, he returned to the U.S. and signed with the Oakland Raiders for only two weeks.

== Criminal charges ==
While playing professional football in Canada, Rozier allegedly wrote bad checks for US$20,000–30,000 (equivalent to about $59,000–88,000 in 2025). By November 1986, the Royal Canadian Mounted Police had 32 warrants for fraud against Rozier.

=== Nation of Yahweh ===
After meeting founder Yahweh ben Yahweh in 1982, by 1986, Rozier had become an ardent supplicant to the Nation of Yahweh, a religious movement that "teaches that American blacks are the true Jews." He donated all of his possessions, and took the name Neariah Israel.

In an effort to join Yahweh's "Brotherhood"—"a secret group […] of tall, muscular young men available for discrete [sic] missions"—Rozier undertook the initiation of killing random "white devils". In April 1986, in the Miami neighborhood of Coconut Grove, Rozier followed a drunk white man to his apartment and killed him and his roommate with a twelve-inch (300 mm) Japanese knife. On September 5, Rozier and another Brotherhood member killed the unconscious 61-year-old Raymond Kelly, who was parked in a bar parking lot; the two men cut off the victim's ear to show ben Yahweh, and when they lost it, returned to the body to cut off the other. Fifteen days later, Rozier and three other Yahwehs killed 45-year-old Cecil Branch (stabbing him 25 times) in retaliation for a previous confrontation.

On October 27, 1986, the Nation of Yahweh bought a five-building apartment complex in Opa-locka, Florida, for $480,000 (equivalent to about $1.41 million in 2025). Under the auspices of trying to improve the property, Yahweh members spent that week attempting to evict residents. On October 31, 28-year-old Anthony Brown and 37-year-old Rudolph Broussard were shot to death, and Rozier was charged with one count of first-degree murder.

Upon Rozier's arrest, he told police that "he was 404 years old and couldn't remember his life before conversion." For seven months, the Nation supported Rozier with a lawyer (Ellis Rubin) and a public-relations campaign; when Rozier issued an ultimatum to the church for a different lawyer, he was excommunicated. In March 1988, Rozier turned state's evidence in exchange for a 22-year sentence. He told of the Nation of Yahweh's crimes to the Metro-Dade Police Department (MDPD): some murders were committed in retaliation, some members of the church would brag about killing on behalf of the group, and a church rumor told of its own involvement in the 1983 public beating death of martial artist Leonard Dupree. Rozier also explained about the Brotherhood, its initiation, and its purpose. All-told, Rozier personally confessed to four murders.

By 1990, the MDPD had built a "14-murder conspiracy indictment against 16 members of the Yahweh Nation and their spiritual leader, Yahweh Ben Yahweh." This case relied heavily upon Rozier's claims, a vector of attack used by Yahwehs' criminal defense lawyers; Patricia Williams (defending Judith Israel a.k.a. Linda Gaines) claimed "Robert Rozier is singing a song in order to avoid a life sentence or death sentence", and Curtis Jones (defending Isaiah Solomon Israel a.k.a. James Littlejohn) alleged that "He's the biggest liar […] I dare say the man would lie on his mother, much less Yahweh Ben Yahweh, his friends and associates. ... He's been able to elude Old Sparky (Florida's electric chair) four times." Despite these attacks on Rozier, the MDPD had never caught the man in a lie. While ben Yahweh was acquitted on state charges after Rozier was discredited, he was convicted on federal conspiracy charges on the strength of Rozier's testimony.

For his 22-year sentence, Rozier was imprisoned outside of Florida under a new name courtesy the United States Federal Witness Protection Program. In 1996, after ten years behind bars, Rozier was paroled with the new identity of Robert Rameses. In 1999, he expressed remorse for his crimes, telling the Associated Press that he had "rebuilt his life in an intense spiritual and intellectual transformation."

In July 1984, a white homeless man—Attilio Cicala—was killed in Essex County, New Jersey. Over fourteen years later in March 1999, a county grand jury indicted Rozier and John Armstrong for murder; prosecutors alleged it was a sacrifice to ben Yahweh for the cult leader's impending visit to Newark, New Jersey. In September 2000, the prosecutor's office dropped the charges, citing "insufficient credible evidence": of three crucial witnesses, one had died, a second was deported, and the third was unreliable. Rozier's lawyer told the press that his client had witnessed Cicala's murder and previously cooperated with state and federal offices.

=== Third strike ===
On February 5, 1999, Rozier was arrested (as Rameses) by El Dorado County, California, sheriff's deputies for a bounced check of $66 (equivalent to $127.56 in 2025). Rozier volunteered his criminal past and former identity; though the new charge would otherwise be a misdemeanor, under California's then-new three-strikes law, state prosecutors sought felony charges. His bail was set at $10 million (equivalent to about $19M in 2025). At the conclusion of his trial in Placerville, California, Rozier was convicted of bouncing 27 checks for a total of $2,200 (equivalent to $4,252 in 2025); he was sentenced to prison for 25 years-to-life on January 12, 2001. Under his witness-protection alias, Rozier was denied parole on February 16, 2022, and January 28, 2025; he is next eligible for another hearing in January 2028. As of July 2025, Rozier was imprisoned at Mule Creek State Prison as Rameses, with prisoner number P99863.
