= Jungle Fever (album) =

Studio album by The Chakachas
- Released: 1970; 2007 (reissue)
- Recorded: 1970
- Studio: Studio Madeline
- Genre: Soul; funk; Latin American music
- Length: 35:13
- Label: Polydor; Dusty Groove (reissue)
- Producer: Roland Kluger

Jungle Fever is a Latin soul album by The Chakachas.

== Track listing ==
Arranged by Willy Albimoor.

| No. | Title | Writer(s) | Length |
|---|---|---|---|
| 1. | "Chica Chica Bau Bau" | W. Albimoore | 3:44 |
| 2. | "Un Rayo Del Sol" | D. Vangard | 2:46 |
| 3. | "Cha Ka Cha" | Nico Gomez | 2:18 |
| 4. | "Latin Can Can" | Bill Ador | 3:55 |
| 5. | "Yo Soy Cubano" | Nico Gomez | 2:40 |
| 6. | "Eso Es El Amor" | Peps Iglesias | 2:47 |
| 7. | "Harlem Nocturne" | Earl Hagen | 3:28 |
| 8. | "Ay Mulata" | Nico Gomez; Tito Madinez | 3:02 |
| 9. | "El Canyon Rojo" | Bill Ador | 2:31 |
| 10. | "El Rico Son" | L. Ricardo; B. Ador | 3:09 |
| 11. | "Jungle Fever" | Bill Ador | 4:23 |
