= Treat Her Like a Lady (Cornelius Brothers & Sister Rose song) =

Single by Cornelius Brothers & Sister Rose

from the album Cornelius Brothers & Sister Rose
- B-side: "Over at My Place"
- Released: April 1971
- Genre: Rock; R&B
- Length: 2:46
- Label: United Artists; UA 50721
- Songwriter: Eddie Cornelius

Cornelius Brothers & Sister Rose singles chronology
"Treat Her Like a Lady" (1971)	"Too Late to Turn Back Now" (1972)

"Treat Her Like a Lady" is a 1971 single by Cornelius Brothers & Sister Rose. Written by Eddie Cornelius, it was a big success in the American R&B and pop charts reaching the U.S. R&B Top 20 and the Billboard Hot 100 No. 3 in July. The song also charted in Canada, reaching No. 10.

Billboard ranked "Treat Her Like a Lady" as the No. 15 song for 1971. The record was awarded a gold disc on 2 August 1971 for one million sales by the Recording Industry Association of America (RIAA).

== Appearances ==
"Treat Her Like a Lady" appeared during the opening credits of Anchorman: The Legend of Ron Burgundy.

== Chart performance ==
=== Weekly singles charts ===
Chart (1971)	Peak position
Canada RPM	10
U.S. Billboard Hot 100	3
U.S. Billboard R&B	20
U.S. Cash Box Top 100	2

=== Year-end charts ===
Chart (1971)	Rank
U.S. Billboard Hot 100	15
U.S. Cash Box	14

== Certifications ==
Certifications for "Treat Her Like a Lady "
Region	Certification	Certified units/sales
United States (RIAA)	Gold	1,000,000^{^}
^{^} Shipments figures based on certification alone.

== Chart run ==
Billboard Hot 100 (18 weeks, entered April 10): Reached #3 in July

Cashbox (23 weeks, entered March 13): 92, 89, 88, 85, 79, 70, 65, 54, 45, 37, 31, 26, 14, 10, 8, 5, 2, 3, 6, 8, 25, 35, 53

== Covers ==
- "Treat Her Like a Lady" was covered on March 30, 2010, during the ninth season of American Idol by Lee DeWyze.
- "Treat Her Like a Lady" was covered by Henry Lee Summer on his second CBS/Epic album I've Got Everything and was released as the second single from the album.
