= Love Me, Love Me Love =

1971 song by Frank Mills

"Love Me, Love Me Love" is a single recorded on Polydor in 1971 by Canadian Frank Mills. The song appeared on Mills' first solo album, Seven Of My Songs

== Chart performance ==
It was a #1 hit in Canada on the RPM chart for two weeks, starting on 26 February 1972. after making its debut on the Canadian charts in December 1971. It reached #46 on the U.S. Billboard Hot 100 and #8 on Billboard′s Easy Listening chart.
