= Ain't Understanding Mellow =

Single by Jerry Butler and Brenda Lee Eager

from the album The Sagittarius Movement
- B-side: "Windy City Soul"
- Released: November 1971
- Genre: Chicago soul
- Length: 4:25
- Label: Mercury
- Songwriter(s): Homer Talbert, Herscholt Polk
- Producer(s): Gerald Sims, Jerry Butler

Jerry Butler and Brenda Lee Eager singles chronology
| "Walk Easy My Son" (1971) | "Ain't Understanding Mellow" (1971) | "I Only Have Eyes for You" (1972) |

Brenda Lee Eager singles chronology
| "If It's Real What I Feel" (1971) | "Ain't Understanding Mellow" (1971) | "(They Long to Be) Close to You" (1972) |

"Ain't Understanding Mellow" is a song written by Homer Talbert and Herscholt Polk and performed by Jerry Butler and Brenda Lee Eager. The song was arranged by James Mack and produced by Gerald Sims and Jerry Butler. It was featured on Butler's 1971 album The Sagittarius Movement.

== Chart performance ==
It reached #3 on the U.S. R&B chart, #21 on the U.S. pop chart, and #67 in Canada in 1972. The song ranked #84 on Billboard magazine's Top 100 singles of 1972.

== Certifications ==
"Ain't Understanding Mellow" was the second of two singles which were gold certified by the RIAA for Butler, selling over a million copies. The first was "Only the Strong Survive" in 1969.

== Sampling ==
- The song was sampled in 2002 by Angie Stone for the song Bring Your Heart featured on the Brown Sugar
- The song was sampled in the 2012 song "4EvaNaDay (Theme)" by Big K.R.I.T. on his album 4eva N a Day.
