= Yahweh ben Yahweh =

Nation of Yahweh Founder (1935–2007)

- Born: Hulon Mitchell Jr. October 27, 1935; Kingfisher, Oklahoma, U.S.
- Died: May 7, 2007 (aged 71); Miami, Florida, U.S.
- Occupations: Leader of Nation of Yahweh and Yahweh University

Yahweh ben Yahweh (born Hulon Mitchell Jr.; October 27, 1935 – May 7, 2007) was an American religious leader and founder of the black separatist and black supremacist Nation of Yahweh, a new religious movement headquartered in Florida that, at its peak, had thousands of black American devotees. He preached that Jesus was black and that "white devils" temporarily rule over black people, and was seen as teaching hate. Mitchell was indicted on three counts of federal racketeering and extortion charges, of which he was found not guilty. However, he was convicted of conspiracy to commit murder.

== Early life ==
Yahweh ben Yahweh was born Hulon Mitchell Jr. on October 27, 1935, one of 15 children born to Hulon Mitchell Sr., the minister of the Antioch Church of God in Christ in Enid, Oklahoma, and Pearl O. Mitchell (née Leatherman), pianist for the same congregation.

After leaving Oklahoma, Mitchell joined the military and then attended law school. He moved to Atlanta and joined the Nation of Islam (NOI) in the 1960s and took the name Hulon X. After leaving the NOI in the late 1960s, he became a faith-healing Christian preacher and named himself Father Mitchell, fashioning himself after Father Divine and Samuel "Father Jehovia" Morris, two African-American ministers and self-proclaimed divine connections to God who were active during the early 20th century. Mitchell arrived in Miami, Florida, in 1978, where he gathered members of the city's Black Hebrew Israelite congregations and founded the Nation of Yahweh.

== Leader of the Nation of Yahweh ==
The Nation of Yahweh set up its headquarters in Liberty City, Florida, in 1979.

Broadly classified as a branch of the Black Hebrew Israelite movement, Mitchell's doctrine emphasized the belief that God and all of the prophets of the Bible were black and that blacks would gain the knowledge of their true history through Mitchell. He also characterized whites and Jews as infidels and oppressors. Mitchell emphasized loyalty to himself as the son of God.

Mitchell's business and charity efforts earned him respect in the community. Then-Miami mayor Xavier Suárez declared "Yahweh ben Yahweh Day" on October 7, 1990, a month before Ben Yahweh's indictment.

Michael T Miller has described Yahweh Ben Yahweh's thought as consisting of "an imminent apocalyptic expectation; [...] a dualistic cosmology which placed [Blacks] in the center of a battle between good and evil, wherein whites were ontologically evil; a firm separatism based on Black pride and economic empowerment; antisemitism; often strict dietary guidelines going above and beyond what is in scripture (commonly advocating vegetarianism for its health benefits); the perception of Christianity as a slave religion designed to subjugate Blacks; a relocation of Heaven and Hell as thisworldly realities; and a rejection of the dualist metaphysics of matter and spirit." He concludes that it is "a theology of vengeance" upon white America, although noting that a change began in 1985 when Mitchell wished to create a more positive image. He also notes that "Mitchell is probably the only [African American] religious leader to have been equally immersed in Black Christianity, Islam, and Judaism."

== Crimes and aftermath ==
Yahweh ben Yahweh was in trouble with the law by the 1990s, although his followers remained devoted to him. Between 1990 and 2001, he served eleven years of an eighteen-year sentence on a Racketeer Influenced and Corrupt Organizations Act (RICO) conviction after he and several other Nation of Yahweh members were convicted of conspiracy for their ex-followers' role in more than a dozen murders. Robert Rozier, a former NFL player and a devotee of Mitchell's, confessed to seven of these murders.

Ben Yahweh faced conviction only for conspiracy to murder. A primary component of the prosecution's case was Rozier, who testified in return for a lighter sentence. Rozier later entered the Witness Protection Program, but returned to prison on a sentence of 25 years to life under California's three-strikes law, following a check-kiting conviction. Mitchell had the Federal Bureau of Prisons ID# 22031-034.

Ben Yahweh was released on parole in 2001 and returned to Miami, but his activities were restricted until a few months before his death. He was prohibited from reconnecting with his old congregation. To ensure this, he was restricted from any form of speech by Internet, telephone, computer, radio or television that could place him in contact with any Nation of Yahweh members.

== Last years and death ==
In 2006, as ben Yahweh became increasingly ill with prostate cancer, Jayne Weintraub, his attorney, petitioned the U.S. District Court for his release from parole to permit him to "die with dignity".

Mitchell died on May 7, 2007, at the age of 71. The location was not disclosed. "[Mitchell] will be remembered and mourned by the millions of people that he touched through prayer and teachings", his lawyers, Jayne Weintraub and Steven Potolsky, said in a joint statement.

== Family ==
One of Mitchell's siblings is Leona Mitchell, his younger sister, a soprano who sang at the Metropolitan Opera.

== See also ==
- Robert Rozier, murderer associated with Yahweh ben Yahweh's organization
- Zebra murders
- List of messiah claimants
- List of people claimed to be Jesus
- Messiah complex
- Black supremacy
