= Nation of Yahweh =

Predominantly African American religious movement

The Nation of Yahweh is a Black Hebrew Israelite religious movement which was founded in 1979 in Miami by Hulon Mitchell Jr., who went by the name Yahweh ben Yahweh. (Yahweh is one of the proper names of the Abrahamic god, so Yahweh ben Yahweh essentially means "God, son of God".) Its goal is to move African Americans, who it believes are the original Israelites, to Israel. The group accepts Yahweh ben Yahweh as the Son of God. In this way, its beliefs are unique and distinct from those of other Black Hebrew Israelite groups.

Its founder, Hulon Mitchell, was indicted on federal racketeering and extortion charges and convicted of conspiracy to commit murder. The group is classified as a black supremacist cult by the Southern Poverty Law Center and as a cult by The Miami Herald.

The organization describes itself as follows: "In 1979, Yahweh Ben Yahweh came to Miami and became the Spiritual Leader and Founder of The Nation of Yahweh. Although he took a vow of poverty, in seven years he guided The Nation to amass a $250,000,000 empire. Under his direction, The Nation has grown to encompass disciples, followers, and supporters in over 1,300 cities within the U.S. and 16 other countries."

== Criticism ==
The SPLC has criticized the beliefs of the Nation of Yahweh as racist, stating that the group believes that Black people are the true Israelites and whites hold "wicked powers". The Nation of Yahweh has ceased to openly condemn white people as "white devils" as it once did. The SPLC also claims that the group believes that Yahweh ben Yahweh had a Messianic mission to vanquish whites and that it held views similar to those of the Christian Identity movement, which believes that "Aryans" are the true Israelites and non-whites are devils. The SPLC quotes Tom Metzger of White Aryan Resistance as saying, "[Groups like the Nation of Yahweh are] the Black counterpart of us." By 2007, the Nation of Yahweh had eliminated calls for violence and toned down its anti-white rhetoric, but remained Black supremacist and antisemitic in its ideology.

The Anti-Defamation League (ADL) has criticized the Nation of Yahweh and some other Black Hebrew sects, stating, "In 1987, ADL reported on Black sects holding these views [arguing that today's Jews are not the 'chosen people' described in the Bible ... instead that the label applies to people of African descent], such as the Yahwehs and the Original African Hebrew Israelite Nation of Jerusalem."

Yahweh ben Yahweh was known to control the clothing, food, and sex lives of group members and became intimately involved with many female followers. "We may be rabbis and nuns here," he told The New York Times, "but we don't believe in celibacy."

Most followers were men; the main elders were men as well. Yahweh ben Yahweh's wife, Linda Gaines (Judith Israel), became a significant helper and leader. Gaines collected money, handled finances and the possessions of full-time workers. She had a bodyguard and was high up in the following.

== Current activities ==
The Yahweh ben Yahweh group appeared in the news again in 2012 after "Michael the Black Man" (real name Maurice Woodside), a former member of the group who is now a conservative activist, was invited to speak at a rally for Rick Santorum's presidential campaign during which he said that Democrats were akin to Nazis. Woodside has since become a vocal supporter of Donald Trump, but continues to defend Yahweh ben Yahweh and the Nation's beliefs.

== See also ==
- Robert Rozier, murderer associated with the Nation of Yahweh
