= Jungle Fever (song) =

- 7" vinyl single cover

Single by The Chakachas

from the album Jungle Fever
- B-side: "Cha Ka Cha"
- Released: 1971
- Recorded: 1970
- Genre: Latin; funk; proto-disco
- Length: 4:20
- Label: Swineyard
- Songwriter: Bill Ador (pseudonym for Willy Albimoor)
- Producer: Roland Kluger
- Awarded a gold disc by the R.I.A.A.

"Jungle Fever" is a 1971 track performed by Belgian producers the Chakachas, written by pianist and arranger Willy Albimoor (as Bill Ador) and first issued in Belgium by Swineyard, an independent record label. Writing in AllMusic, critic Steve Huey described it as “a down-and-dirty, stop-start funk instrumental punctuated by heavy breathing and orgasmic female moans.”

== Chart performance ==
In 1972, the song reached No. 8 on the U.S. Billboard Hot 100, number 13 on the New Zealand Listener charts and peaked at No. 29 on the UK Singles Chart. "Jungle Fever" was banned by the BBC, who took exception to the song's heavy breathing and moaning. The song was a greater success in America, selling over one million copies and being awarded a gold disc by the R.I.A.A. in March 1972. Billboard ranked it as the No. 51 song for 1972.

== In other media ==
"Jungle Fever" was featured in the 1997 film Boogie Nights as well as the 2004 videogame Grand Theft Auto: San Andreas, on the fictional radio station Master Sounds 98.3. As a result of featuring in Boogie Nights, the song was included on the film's soundtrack album, Boogie Nights: Music from the Original Motion Picture. "Jungle Fever" was also included in the 2000 comedy film Next Friday, the September 2005 release Just Like Heaven, and a commercial in the I Am Canadian ad campaign in the early 2000s by Molson Coors Beverage Company. The song is also featured in the 2019 film Good Boys and the 2024 film Blink Twice.

== Sampling ==
A snippet of the moan was double-tracked and used in the 1972 novelty break-in record "Convention '72" by the Delegates. In addition, "Jungle Fever" has often been sampled in hip-hop, including by Miami rap group 2 Live Crew on their track "Put Her in the Buck", which was featured on their 1989 album As Nasty as They Wanna Be. The song was also sampled by MC 900 Ft. Jesus for the song "Dancing Barefoot" on the 1991 album Welcome to My Dream.
