= Too Late to Turn Back Now (song) =

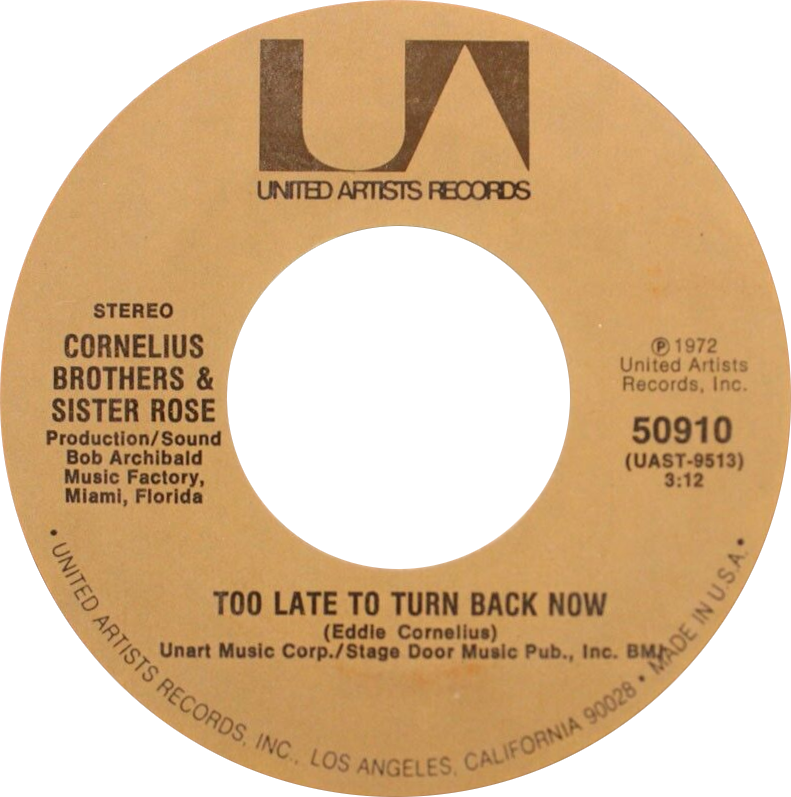
- Side A of the US single

Single by Cornelius Brothers & Sister Rose

from the album Cornelius Brothers & Sister Rose
- B-side: "Lift Your Love Higher"
- Released: May 1972
- Recorded: 1970
- Genre: Soul
- Length: 3:18
- Label: United Artists; UA 50910
- Songwriter: Eddie Cornelius
- Producer: Bob Archibald

Cornelius Brothers & Sister Rose singles chronology
"Treat Her Like a Lady" (1971)	"Too Late to Turn Back Now" (1972)	"Don't Ever Be Lonely (A Poor Little Fool Like Me)" (1972)

"Too Late to Turn Back Now" is the 1972 follow-up single of Cornelius Brothers & Sister Rose to their debut hit "Treat Her Like a Lady". The single was originally released in 1970 on the Platinum label.

Written by Eddie Cornelius, "Too Late to Turn Back Now" had great success upon its re-release, peaking at No. 2 on the Billboard Hot 100 (behind "Lean on Me" by Bill Withers) and No. 5 on the U.S. R&B chart. It went to No. 1 on Cash Box's chart of the Top 100 Singles for the week of July 29, 1972.

"Too Late to Turn Back Now" is ranked as the 34th biggest U.S. hit of 1972. The record was awarded a gold disc on 2 August for one million sales by the Recording Industry Association of America (RIAA).

== Chart performance ==
=== Weekly charts ===
Chart (1972)	Peak position
Australia	15
Canada RPM Top Singles	1
New Zealand (Listener)	20
U.S. Billboard Hot 100	2
U.S. R&B Singles	5
U.S. Billboard Adult Contemporary	6
U.S. Cashbox Top 100	1

=== Year-end charts ===
Chart (1972)	Rank
U.S. Billboard Hot 100	34
Canada	61

== In popular culture ==
The song was featured in the 1997 film The Ice Storm, the 2018 film BlacKkKlansman and episode 5 of the Amazon Prime Video series Daisy Jones & The Six.

According to the book, Carolina Beach Music: The Classic Years by Rick Simmons, and the Carolina Beach Music Encyclopedia, "Too Late to Turn Back Now" is a Beach music classic.

== See also ==
- List of Cash Box Top 100 number-one singles of 1972
