= Brenda Lee Eager =

American singer, songwriter and musical theater performer

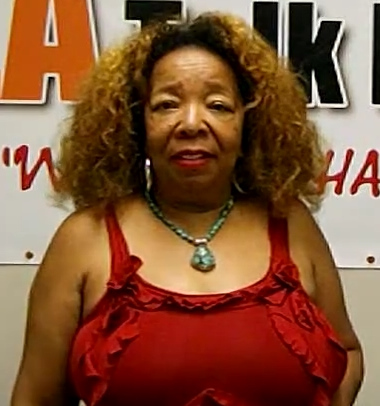
- Eager in 2015

Background information
- Born: August 8, 1947 (age 79); Mobile, Alabama, U.S.
- Genres: Soul, gospel, blues
- Occupations: Singer, songwriter
- Instrument: Piano
- Years active: c. 1970-present
- Labels: Mercury, Playboy, Private-I
- Website: www.brendaeagermusic.com

Brenda Lee Eager (born August 8, 1947) is an American soul singer, songwriter and musical theatre performer who has written and performed several hits, including "Ain't Understanding Mellow", "Close to You", and "Somebody's Somebody".

== Life and career ==
She was born in Mobile, Alabama, and brought up in the small town of Lower Peach Tree, where she began singing in church as a child. She also started writing songs, and by the tenth grade led her own vocal group. She first sang professionally at the age of 17 at the Kings Club in Prichard, Alabama.

She later relocated to Chicago, Illinois, and by 1971 was the lead singer in Jerry Butler's backup group Peaches. She recorded several singles with Butler, including, "Ain't Understanding Mellow", which was her biggest chart success, reaching number 3 on the Billboard R&B chart, number 21 on the Hot 100, and number 67 in Canada. It sold over one million copies and was awarded a gold disc by the R.I.A.A in April 1972. Their duet version of "(They Long to Be) Close to You" reached number 6 on the R&B chart and number 91 on the pop chart in 1972. She also sang regularly in Rev. Jesse Jackson's Operation Breadbasket Choir in Chicago in the early 1970s.

As a solo singer, she had two minor R&B chart hits, "Good Old Fashioned Lovin'" (Playboy Records, 1975) and "Watch My Body Talk" (Private-I Records, 1984). She worked as a backup singer for such artists as Ray Charles, Mavis Staples, Diana Ross, Stevie Wonder and Graham Nash. She has also written songs recorded by Bobby Womack, the Staples Singers, Aretha Franklin, Cliff Richard, Gladys Knight, Shirley Brown, Prince, and others. She released an album, Startin' Over, in 2000.

She performed in the musicals The Message is in the Music, alongside Della Reese, and Wild Woman Blues, in Europe with blues singer Maine Weldon. Since 2006, she has directed The Heaven on Earth (T.H.E.) Choir at the City of Angels Church in Culver City, California. She has also written and performed in a one-woman musical theatre show based on her own life, Grace, which premiered in Los Angeles in 2010.
