= The Chakachas =

Belgian musical group

The Chakachas were a Belgium-based group of Latin soul studio musicians. Also known as Les Chakachas, Los Chakachas, or Los Chicles, they were formed by bandleader Gaston Bogaerts, percussion (conga and tumba); Kari Kenton, vocals and maracas; Vic Ingeveldt (a Dutchman from Liège), saxophone; Charlie Lots, trumpet; Christian Marc, piano; Henri Breyre, guitar and backing vocals; and Bill Raymond, bass guitar. All were native to Schaerbeek (a district of Brussels), or nearby Charleroi, Willebroek and Liège.

== History ==
They started out in the late 1950s as cha-cha-cha band, and had a Belgian No. 1 in 1958 with "Eso es el amor", which was sung in Spanish. In 1959 they recorded "Rebecca" (a.k.a. "Rebekka"), which was featured seven years later in the film The Battle of Algiers.

Once the great wave of Afro-Cuban inspired rhythms had passed, the Chakachas transitioned in 1961 to the yéyé genre and they ventured into the "Twist" craze with tracks like "Twist-Twist" (1961), "Hawaiian War Twist" (1962), "Big Strong Madison" and "Madison 62" (1962). In 1962, they reached the UK Singles Chart for the first time with "Twist Twist", peaking in the UK Singles Chart at number 48. They also began to use the English language, and even occasionally German with "Der Twist ist passé" and "Mitternachts Hully-Gully" (1963).

Although they issued numerous recordings, they are best remembered as a one-hit wonder for their hit disco single "Jungle Fever" from 1971, which sold over one million copies in the United States, and was awarded a gold disc by the R.I.A.A. in March 1972. It also reached No. 8 in the US Billboard Hot 100. In the UK it fared less well: despite some airplay soon after release it was later pulled from airplay by the BBC, which took exception to the song's moaning and heavy breathing. It peaked at No. 29. The album with the same name would reach No. 117 in the US. The song was featured in the movie Boogie Nights and on the Grand Theft Auto: San Andreas soundtrack, being played on fictional radio station Master Sounds 98.3. It was sampled on the songs "Put Her in the Buck" on the As Nasty as They Wanna Be album by 2 Live Crew, "Rock Freak" on Natural Ingredients by Luscious Jackson, Ambassador's "Honor and Glory", Antoinette's "I Got an Attitude", Beatnuts' "Story 2000", CEO's "Hit Me with the Beat", and Public Enemy's "Cold Lampin' with Flavor". More recently, Louie Vega used the track as the basis for a remix incorporating new vocals by American poet Ursula Rucker on The Elements of Life (2004).

The Chakachas song "Yo Soy Cubano" from their 1970 album, Jungle Fever, was sampled in the Mighty Dub Katz' song "Magic Carpet Ride" ("Son of Wilmot Mix") in 1995. More recently, the "ah-ring-ting-ting" vocal was sampled as the hook in the 2012 Kendrick Lamar song "Backseat Freestyle".

In 2013, the song "Stories" was featured as an in-game radio station track in the eighth-generation console and PC release of Grand Theft Auto V. This song was also covered by the band Cake, renamed as "Thrills" in their album B-Sides and Rarities.. It was also covered by IZIT (UK vocal/instrumental group) in 1989. It was also covered by the band Dope Lemon, renamed "Home Soon" in 2017.

Gaston Bogaerts died on 9 December 2022, at the age of 101.

Kari Kento (born Caridad Hernandez y Penalver) died on 16 May 2005 in Cuba.
