= I Gotcha (Joe Tex song) =

Single by Joe Tex

Single by Joe Tex

from the album I Gotcha
- A-side: "A Mother's Prayer"
- Released: December 1971
- Recorded: 1971
- Studio: American (Memphis, Tennessee)
- Genre: Soul; funk
- Length: 2:18
- Label: Dial Records
- Songwriter: Joe Tex
- Producer: Buddy Killen

Joe Tex singles chronology
"Give the Baby Anything the Baby Wants" (1971)	"I Gotcha" (1971)	"A Mother's Prayer" (1972)

"I Gotcha" is a song by Joe Tex. Originally intended for King Floyd, instead Tex recorded it himself in the late 1960s, but did not release it at that time. He decided to re-record it in late 1971 and released it as the B-side of "A Mother's Prayer", the first single from his 1972 album I Gotcha. Mostly spoken in the form of an early rap song, with few singing passages, "I Gotcha" has the singer chastising a woman for playing with his affections: "You never shouldn't have promised if you weren't gonna do it".

Radio DJs ended up playing this B-side song more than the A-side. This would result in Tex having his first major hit in five years as "I Gotcha" eventually peaked at number one in the US, on the R&B chart and number two on the Pop chart for two weeks, behind "The First Time Ever I Saw Your Face" by Roberta Flack and would sell around three million copies. Billboard ranked it as the No. 6 song of 1972. In Canada, the song reached number 22. Tex would later re-record "I Gotcha" in a ballad-style for his 1978 album Rub Down.

== Later uses ==
"I Gotcha" was sampled in the 1973 break-in record, "Super Fly Meets Shaft" (US #31).

Like other Tex songs, "I Gotcha" has been sampled in various hip hop and R&B songs over the years, including Salt-n-Pepa's "I Gotcha" from their "A Salt With a Deadly Pepa" album. Liza Minnelli performed the number for her 1972 television concert Liza with a Z. It is also featured on the soundtrack to the 1992 Quentin Tarantino film Reservoir Dogs. A shorter version of the song appears in trailers for Kermit's Swamp Years.

== Jimmy Barnes version ==
"I Gotcha"

Single by Jimmy Barnes

from the album Soul Deep
- B-side: "I Gotcha" (Tex Mex 12-inch mix)
- Released: September 23, 1991
- Recorded: Freight Train (Australia)
- Length: 2:18
- Label: Mushroom
- Songwriter: Joe Tex
- Producers: Don Gehman, Tony Brock

Jimmy Barnes singles chronology
"Love Is Enough" (1991)	"I Gotcha" (1991)	"When Something Is Wrong with My Baby" (1991)

In 1991, Australian rock singer Jimmy Barnes recorded and released "I Gotcha" as the first single from his fifth studio album, Soul Deep. It peaked at number six in Australia and number 27 in New Zealand.

Track listing CD single

1. "I Gotcha"
2. "I Gotcha" (Tex Mex 12" mix)

Charts

Chart (1991)	Peak position
Australia (ARIA)	6
New Zealand (Recorded Music NZ)	27

Certifications

Region	Certification	Certified units/sales
Australia (ARIA)	Gold	35,000^{^}
^{^} Shipments figures based on certification alone.

== See also ==
- List of number-one R&B singles of 1972 (U.S.)
