= Cornelius Brothers & Sister Rose =

American family soul music group

Cornelius Brothers & Sister Rose was an American family soul singing group, from Dania Beach, Florida, United States. It was formed in 1970 and gained popularity in the early 1970s. It was composed of siblings Carter, Eddie, and Rose Cornelius, who were joined by their sister Billie Jo Cornelius in 1972. Cleveland E. Barrett (a childhood friend), an original member of the group, was killed in a car accident before their chart success.

== Group career ==
The group originally formed in the mid 1960s with Eddie and Carter Cornelius as the Cornelius Brothers. After seeing a talent search ad in the paper, the duo auditioned for producer Bob Archibald who then signed them to his label.

Rose Cornelius had already appeared on The Ed Sullivan Show in June 1967 and had been performing in Las Vegas and worldwide, touring in 1970 with a group called the Gospel Jazz Singers. She returned home to Florida at her mother's request to help form the group.

The group hit the pop chart in 1971 with the single "Treat Her Like a Lady" (U.S. R&B Top 20, Billboard Hot 100 No. 3). The record was certified gold by the Recording Industry Association of America on 2 August 1971.

The act succeeded again in 1972 with "Too Late to Turn Back Now" (U.S. R&B No. 5, Hot 100 No. 2); both songs were written by Eddie Cornelius. This also sold over one million copies with a gold disc awarded in August 1972.

While the group failed to find any further success on the scale of their first two singles, two releases, "Don't Ever Be Lonely" and "I'm Never Gonna Be Alone Anymore" reached the Billboard Top 40. Their final charting single was "Since I Found My Baby" in 1974, from their third and last album. Their records were all produced by Bob Archibald at the Music Factory in Miami.

== Break up and aftermath ==
The group disbanded in 1976 when Carter Cornelius joined the Nation of Yahweh, a Black Hebrew sect in Miami, and adopted the name Prince Gideon Israel. He wrote, recorded, and mixed music and videos for that group the next 15 years. He died of a heart attack on November 7, 1991.

Eddie Cornelius became a born-again Christian and later an ordained pastor who continued to sing, produce, and write music. In June 2020, he released a memoir titled It's Not Too Late To Turn Back Now (Back To The Open Arms Of God).

On January 19, 2001, the surviving members of the group filed a multimillion-dollar lawsuit against Capitol Records, Cornelius v. EMI Music, Inc., Case No. 2001-1350 CA-01, in the Miami Dade Circuit Court. The suit was dismissed without prejudice three years later for want of prosecution, meaning that the plaintiffs did not actively pursue the case.

== Discography ==
=== Albums ===
Year	Album	Peak chart positions	
Year	Album	^{US 200}	^{US R&B}
July 1972	Cornelius Brothers & Sister Rose	29	12
December 1973	Big Time Lover	—	32
March 1976	Greatest Hits	—	60

=== Singles ===
Year	Single	Peak chart positions				Album
Year	Single	US HOT	US R&B	US AC	AUS	Album
1971	"Treat Her Like a Lady"	3	20	—	—	Cornelius Brothers & Sister Rose
1972	"Too Late to Turn Back Now"	2	5	6	30	Cornelius Brothers & Sister Rose
1972	"Don't Ever Be Lonely (A Poor Little Fool Like Me)"	23	28	27	—	Cornelius Brothers & Sister Rose
1972	"I'm Never Gonna Be Alone Anymore"	37	43	10	—	Cornelius Brothers & Sister Rose
1973	"Let Me Down Easy"	96	—	—	—	Cornelius Brothers & Sister Rose
1973	"I Just Can't Stop Loving You"	104	79	—	—	Big Time Lover
1974	"Big Time Lover"	—	88	—	—	Big Time Lover
1974	"Since I Found My Baby"	—	59	—	—	Greatest Hits
1974	"Got to Testify (Love)"**	—	—	—	—	Greatest Hits

**N.B.: "Got to Testify (Love)" reached No. 15 on the US Dance chart.
