= List of Billboard Hot 100 number ones of 1972 =

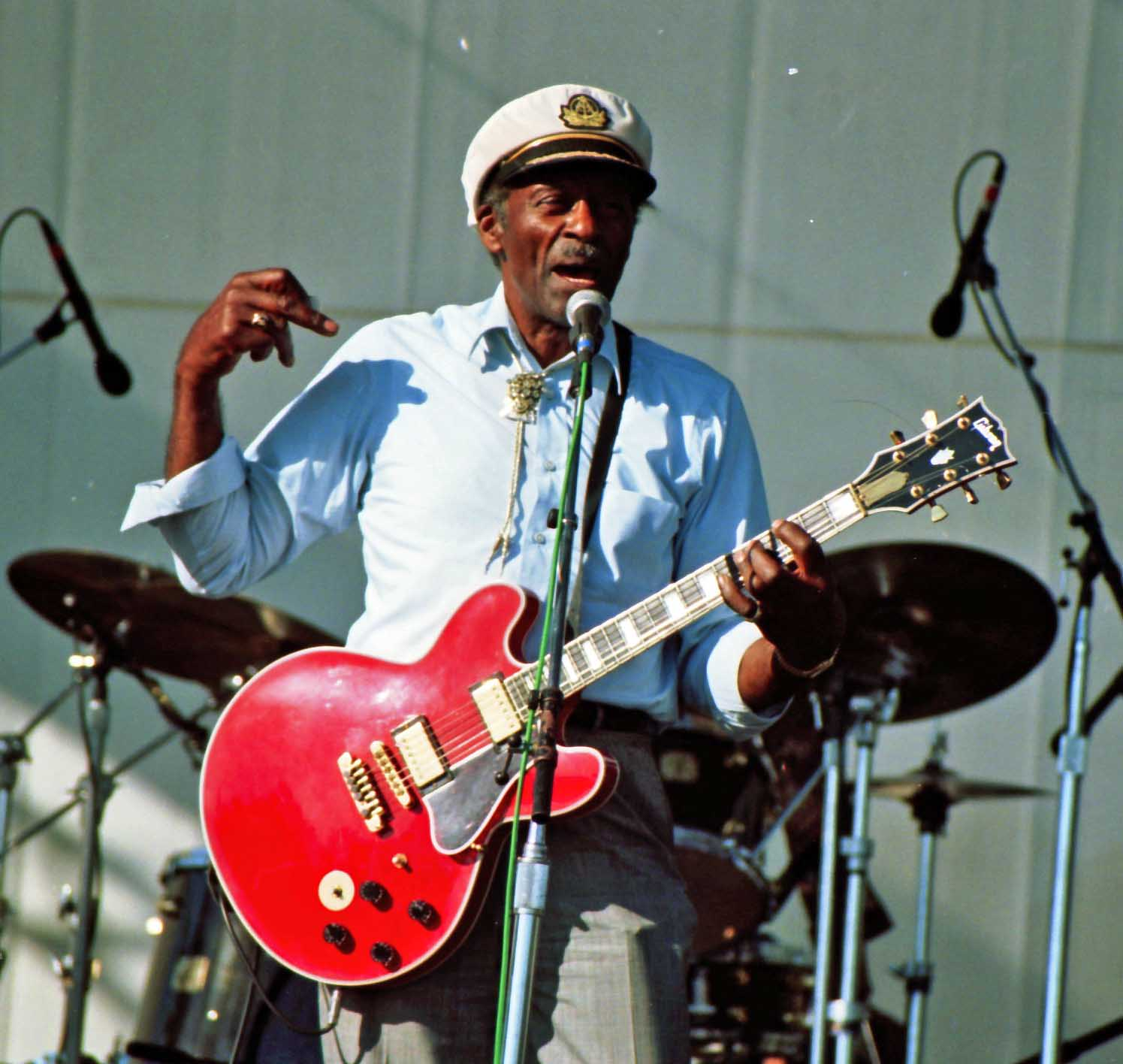
Chuck Berry (pictured in 1997), one of the pioneers of rock and roll, had his only Hot 100 number one in 1972 with the novelty song "My Ding-a-Ling".

The Billboard Hot 100 is a chart published since August 1958 by Billboard magazine which ranks the best-performing singles in the United States. In 1972, it was compiled based on a combination of sales and airplay data sourced from surveys of retail outlets and playlists submitted by radio stations respectively. During the year, 22 different singles spent time at number one.

In the issue of Billboard dated January 1, Melanie was at number one with "Brand New Key", retaining the top spot from the final chart of 1971. Two weeks later, Don McLean topped the chart with "American Pie", his first number one. The song, known for its cryptic lyrics about the musical and cultural landscape of America throughout the 1960s, has been called one of the greatest songs of all time. It is also known for its exceptional length; clocking in at nearly nine minutes, it was split across the two sides of a 7" single. It held the record of being the longest song to top the Hot 100 until "All Too Well (10 Minute Version)" by Taylor Swift reached number one in 2021. "American Pie" was the first in a run of nine consecutive number ones by acts that had never previously topped the Hot 100: between February and June, Al Green, Nilsson, Neil Young, America, Roberta Flack, the Chi-Lites, the Staple Singers, and Sammy Davis Jr. all gained their first chart-toppers. America's "A Horse with No Name" was the band's first charting song; in contrast, Davis, a veteran of Broadway theater, film and television, had placed songs on Billboard's pop music charts since 1954. Flack's "The First Time Ever I Saw Your Face" spent six consecutive weeks at number one, the year's longest unbroken run atop the chart.

Between July and September, Bill Withers, Gilbert O'Sullivan, Looking Glass, and Mac Davis gained their first number ones. O'Sullivan's "Alone Again (Naturally)" matched the six weeks spent at number one by "The First Time Ever I Saw Your Face", albeit non-consecutively. As no act had more than one number one during 1972, the two singers tied for the most weeks spent in the peak position during the year. In the issue dated October 14, Michael Jackson gained his first solo number one with "Ben"; the singer, who was 14 years old when the song reached the top spot, had previously achieved four number ones as a member of the Jackson 5 with his older brothers. A week later, Chuck Berry gained his first Hot 100 number one with the novelty song "My Ding-a-Ling". The singer, acclaimed as one of the most influential performers in the development of American popular music and a member of the inaugural class of the Rock and Roll Hall of Fame in 1986, had achieved success on the pop and R&B charts since the mid-1950s but had never topped the Hot 100 until 1972. "My Ding-a-Ling" is seen by critics as a very poor quality single in comparison to his many influential rock and roll songs and it is seen as incongruous that it was his only Hot 100 number one. Johnny Nash, Helen Reddy, and Billy Paul all gained their first number ones during the closing weeks of the year; Nash had first entered Billboard's pop charts as a teenager in 1957, but it took him 15 years to achieve his first number one. In contrast, Paul's chart-topper "Me and Mrs. Jones" was the singer's first Hot 100 entry; it spent three weeks at number one, but he never placed another song in the top 30, and by 1977, his chart career had ended completely.

== Chart history ==
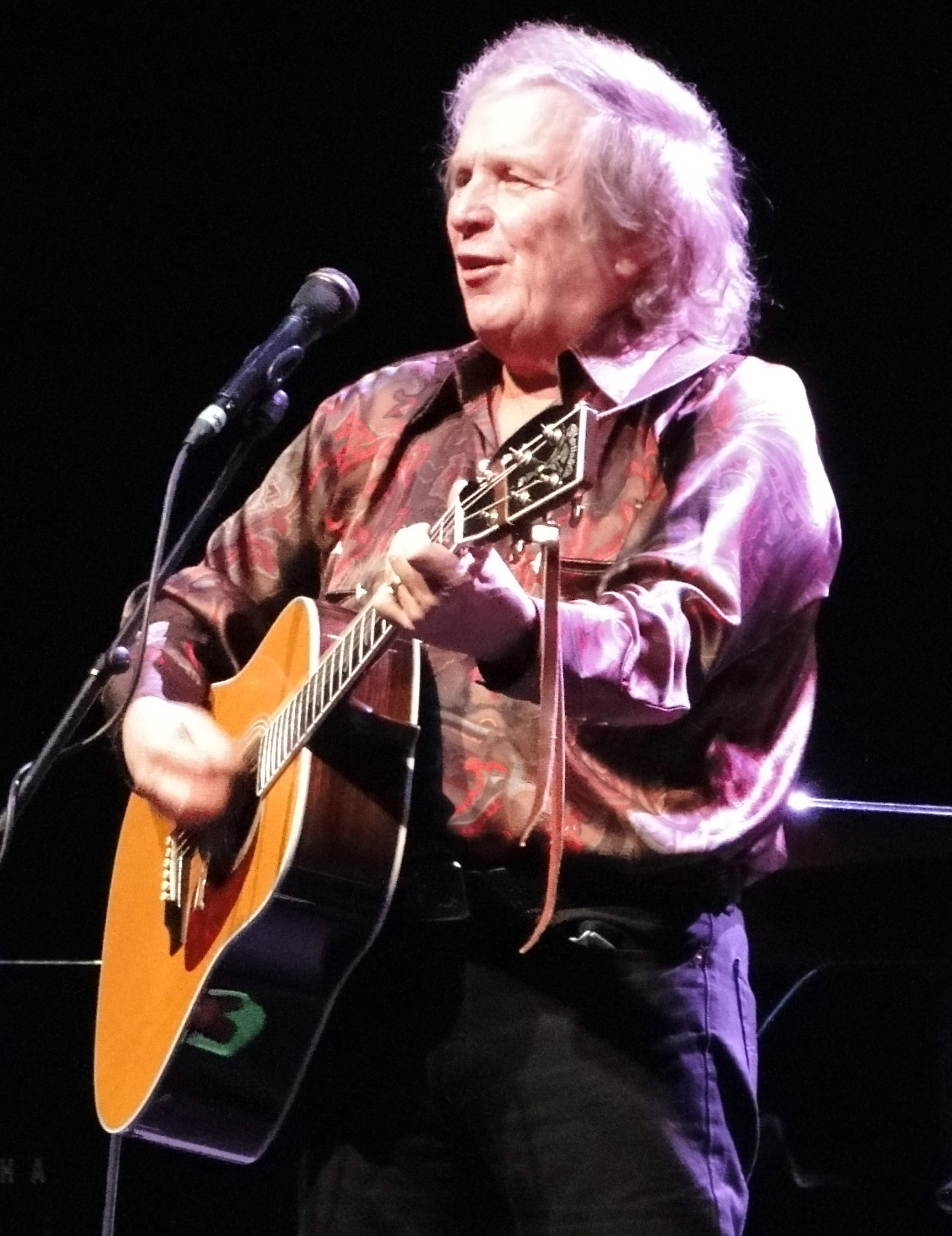
Don McLean (pictured in 2012) topped the Hot 100 with "American Pie" in 1972.

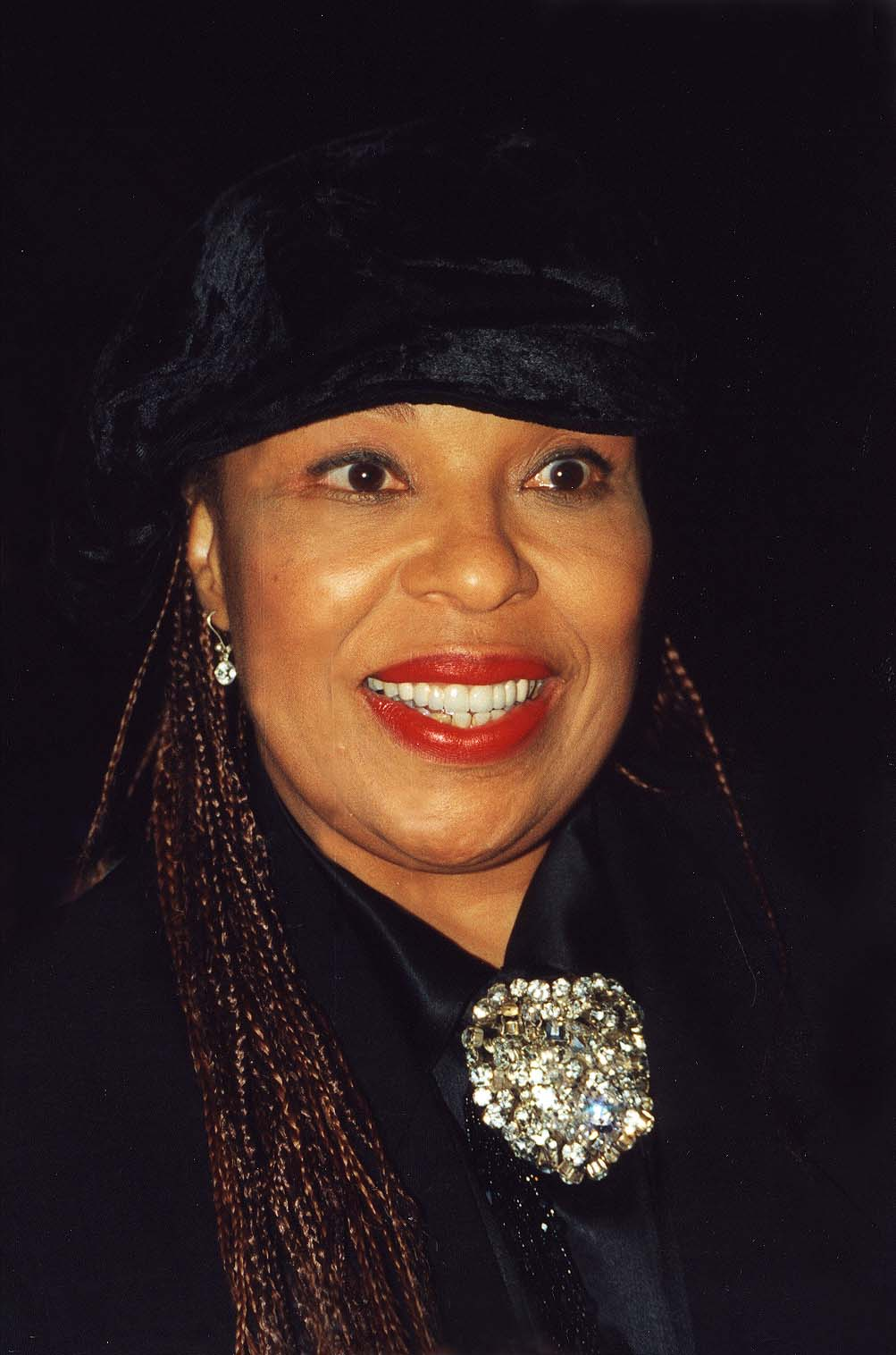
Roberta Flack (pictured in 1995) spent six weeks at number one, the year's longest unbroken run in the top spot, with "The First Time Ever I Saw Your Face".

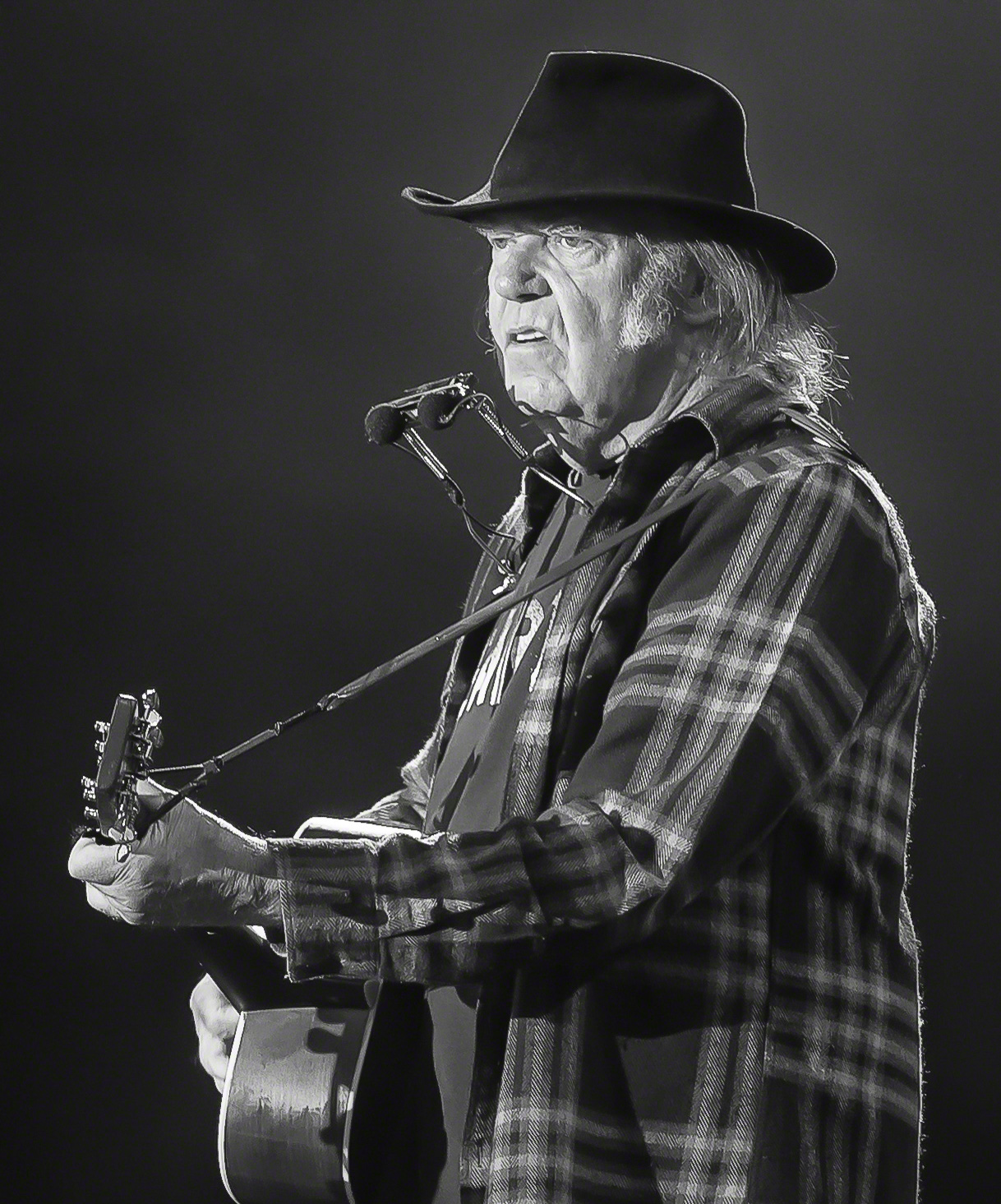
Neil Young (pictured in 2016) had his first number one with "Heart of Gold".

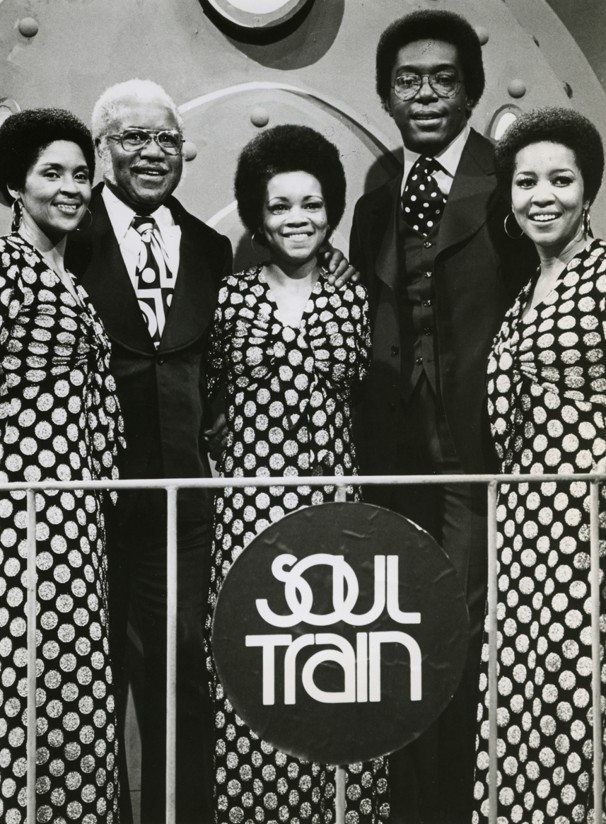
"I'll Take You There" was a number one for the Staple Singers (pictured in 1974 with Don Cornelius, second from right).

Chart history
No. (Note: The "No." column indicates the numerical sequence of number ones in Hot 100 history. "Re" indicates a single returning to number one.)	Issue date	Title	Artist(s)	Ref.
265	January 1	"Brand New Key"	Melanie	
265	January 8	"Brand New Key"	Melanie	
266	January 15	"American Pie"	Don McLean	
266	January 22	"American Pie"	Don McLean	
266	January 29	"American Pie"	Don McLean	
266	February 5	"American Pie"	Don McLean	
267	February 12	"Let's Stay Together"	Al Green	
268	February 19	"Without You"	Nilsson	
268	February 26	"Without You"	Nilsson	
268	March 4	"Without You"	Nilsson	
268	March 11	"Without You"	Nilsson	
269	March 18	"Heart of Gold"	Neil Young	
270	March 25	"A Horse with No Name"	America	
270	April 1	"A Horse with No Name"	America	
270	April 8	"A Horse with No Name"	America	
271	April 15	"The First Time Ever I Saw Your Face"	Roberta Flack	
271	April 22	"The First Time Ever I Saw Your Face"	Roberta Flack	
271	April 29	"The First Time Ever I Saw Your Face"	Roberta Flack	
271	May 6	"The First Time Ever I Saw Your Face"	Roberta Flack	
271	May 13	"The First Time Ever I Saw Your Face"	Roberta Flack	
271	May 20	"The First Time Ever I Saw Your Face"	Roberta Flack	
272	May 27	"Oh Girl"	The Chi-Lites	
273	June 3	"I'll Take You There"	The Staple Singers	
274	June 10	"The Candy Man"	Sammy Davis Jr.	
274	June 17	"The Candy Man"	Sammy Davis Jr.	
274	June 24	"The Candy Man"	Sammy Davis Jr.	
275	July 1	"Song Sung Blue"	Neil Diamond	
276	July 8	"Lean on Me"	Bill Withers	
276	July 15	"Lean on Me"	Bill Withers	
276	July 22	"Lean on Me"	Bill Withers	
277	July 29	"Alone Again (Naturally)"	Gilbert O'Sullivan	
277	August 5	"Alone Again (Naturally)"	Gilbert O'Sullivan	
277	August 12	"Alone Again (Naturally)"	Gilbert O'Sullivan	
277	August 19	"Alone Again (Naturally)"	Gilbert O'Sullivan	
278	August 26	"Brandy (You're a Fine Girl)"	Looking Glass	
277 (re)	September 2	"Alone Again (Naturally)"	Gilbert O'Sullivan	
277 (re)	September 9	"Alone Again (Naturally)"	Gilbert O'Sullivan	
279	September 16	"Black and White"	Three Dog Night	
280	September 23	"Baby, Don't Get Hooked on Me"	Mac Davis	
280	September 30	"Baby, Don't Get Hooked on Me"	Mac Davis	
280	October 7	"Baby, Don't Get Hooked on Me"	Mac Davis	
281	October 14	"Ben"	Michael Jackson	
282	October 21	"My Ding-a-Ling"	Chuck Berry	
282	October 28	"My Ding-a-Ling"	Chuck Berry	
283	November 4	"I Can See Clearly Now"	Johnny Nash	
283	November 11	"I Can See Clearly Now"	Johnny Nash	
283	November 18	"I Can See Clearly Now"	Johnny Nash	
283	November 25	"I Can See Clearly Now"	Johnny Nash	
284	December 2	"Papa Was a Rollin' Stone"	The Temptations	
285	December 9	"I Am Woman"	Helen Reddy	
286	December 16	"Me and Mrs. Jones"	Billy Paul	
286	December 23	"Me and Mrs. Jones"	Billy Paul	
286	December 30	"Me and Mrs. Jones"	Billy Paul	

== Number-one artists ==
List of number-one artists by total weeks at number one
Weeks at No. 1	Artist
6	Roberta Flack
6	Gilbert O'Sullivan
4	Don McLean
4	Nilsson
4	Johnny Nash
3	America
3	Sammy Davis Jr.
3	Bill Withers
3	Mac Davis
3	Billy Paul
2	Melanie
2	Chuck Berry
1	Al Green
1	Neil Young
1	The Chi-Lites
1	The Staple Singers
1	Neil Diamond
1	Looking Glass
1	Three Dog Night
1	Michael Jackson
1	The Temptations
1	Helen Reddy

== See also ==
- 1972 in music
- List of Billboard Hot 100 number-one singles of the 1970s
