= Sounds of the Seventies (Time-Life Music) =

Album by Time Life

Sounds of the Seventies was a 40-volume series issued by Time-Life during the late 1980s and early-to-mid 1990s, spotlighting pop music of the 1970s.

Much like Time-Life's other series chronicling popular music, volumes in the "Sounds of the Seventies" series covered a specific time period, including individual years in some volumes, and different parts of the decade (for instance, the early 1970s) in others; in addition, some volumes covered specific trends, such as music popular on album-oriented rock stations on the FM band. Each volume was issued on either compact disc, cassette or (with volumes issued prior to 1991) vinyl record. Individual volumes generally contained anywhere between 18 and 22 tracks, and represented the highlighted time period's most popular and noteworthy tracks. Also included was a booklet, containing liner notes written by some of the most respected historians of the genre, photographs of the artists, and information on the songs (writers, performers and peak position on Billboard magazine's Billboard Hot 100 chart).

== History ==
"Sounds of the Seventies" was first issued in the summer of 1989, with the first album covering 1970.

As was the case with Time-Life's other series, "Sounds of the Seventies" was advertised in television and magazine advertisements. The series was available by subscription (by calling a 1-800 number); those who purchased the series in that fashion received a new volume roughly every other month (on the format of their choice), and had the option of keeping the volumes they wanted.

Each volume was also offered for individual sale. When the series was fully issued, a customer could purchase the entire series at once (or a group of albums, as packaged by Time-Life as part of a promotion), often at a discounted price.

New volumes in the original series continued to be issued through 1994, the final one being a volume titled Sounds of the Seventies: Celebration, which included several tracks from the early 1980s; that final volume was soon retitled and disconnected from the series. The series resumed in 1996 with at least 11 more volumes—including several dance- and disco-intensive albums—issued through 1999. In addition, a volume featuring television theme songs from the 1970s was also released.

Time-Life continued to offer the complete "Sounds of the Seventies" through the early-2000s (decade), after which it was replaced by various other series. One of those series is titled "Sounds of the 70s," issued in 2010 as a single 10-CD, 198-song package and which remains available for purchase. The track lineup of the current series is identical to the original 1970–1979 volumes of "Sounds of the Seventies."

In 1999, Time-Life issued a "budget" box set, Sounds of the Seventies: Greatest Hits, containing three CDs or cassettes of 12 songs each, for retail sale.

== The series ==
As with many of Time-Life Records' multi-volume releases, the volumes were not issued in a logical, sequential order by date or era of the subject; that is, issuing volumes covering the 1960s before progressing to the 1970s. For instance, while the series began with three sequential albums from 1970 to 1972, the fourth volume featured hit songs from 1976.

== Album track listing ==
=== Sounds of the Seventies: 1970 ===
1. "Up Around the Bend" – Creedence Clearwater Revival – 2:43
2. "War" – Edwin Starr – 3:25
3. "Domino" – Van Morrison – 3:10
4. "Mama Told Me Not to Come" – Three Dog Night – 3:21
5. "The Rapper" – The Jaggerz – 2:44
6. "Uncle John's Band" – Grateful Dead – 3:09
7. "Spirit in the Sky" – Norman Greenbaum – 4:02
8. "The Letter" – Joe Cocker – 4:17
9. "Black Magic Woman" – Santana – 3:18
10. "Love on a Two-Way Street" – The Moments – 3:44
11. "He Ain't Heavy, He's My Brother" – The Hollies – 4:17
12. "ABC" – The Jackson 5 – 3:00
13. "American Woman" – The Guess Who – 3:54
14. "After Midnight" – Eric Clapton – 2:55
15. "Green-Eyed Lady" – Sugarloaf – 3:40
16. "Fire and Rain" – James Taylor – 3:23
17. "The Tears of a Clown" – Smokey Robinson & the Miracles – 3:00
18. "Lonely Days" – Bee Gees – 3:47
19. "Ride Captain Ride" – The Blues Image – 3:42
20. "All Right Now" – Free – 3:49
21. "Thank You (Falettinme Be Mice Elf Agin)" – Sly & the Family Stone – 4:50

=== Sounds of the Seventies: 1971 ===
1. "What's Going On" – Marvin Gaye – 3:47
2. "I'm Eighteen" – Alice Cooper – 2:59
3. "Tired of Being Alone" – Al Green – 2:51
4. "(I Know) I'm Losing You" – Rod Stewart – 3:40
5. "How Can You Mend a Broken Heart?" – Bee Gees – 3:58
6. "Oye Como Va" – Santana – 4:17
7. "Wild Night" – Van Morrison – 3:32
8. "Just My Imagination (Running Away with Me)" – The Temptations – 3:48
9. "Love the One You're With" – Stephen Stills – 3:07
10. "Your Song" – Elton John – 4:01
11. "Ain't No Sunshine" – Bill Withers – 2:04
12. "Proud Mary" – Ike and Tina Turner – 3:23
13. "You've Got a Friend" – James Taylor – 4:32
14. "Maggie May" – Rod Stewart – 5:16
15. "Do You Know What I Mean" – Lee Michaels – 3:14
16. "Never Can Say Goodbye" – The Jackson 5 – 3:02
17. "If You Could Read My Mind" – Gordon Lightfoot – 3:49
18. "Truckin'" – Grateful Dead – 3:16
19. "Joy to the World" – Three Dog Night – 3:18
20. "Family Affair" – Sly & the Family Stone – 3:05
21. "Have You Ever Seen the Rain?" – Creedence Clearwater Revival – 2:39

=== Sounds of the Seventies: 1972 ===
1. I'll Take You There – The Staple Singers – 3:17
2. Let It Rain – Eric Clapton – 5:04
3. Let's Stay Together – Al Green – 3:19
4. Listen to the Music – The Doobie Brothers – 3:28
5. Hold Your Head Up – Argent – 3:37
6. Oh Girl – The Chi-Lites – 3:30
7. Black and White – Three Dog Night – 3:51
8. Long Cool Woman (In a Black Dress) – The Hollies – 3:20
9. Back Stabbers – O'Jays – 3:09
10. Rocket Man (I Think It's Going to Be a Long, Long Time) – Elton John – 4:43
11. School's Out – Alice Cooper – 3:30
12. Lean on Me – Bill Withers – 3:48
13. Go All the Way – Raspberries – 3:22
14. A Horse with No Name – America – 4:13
15. Nights in White Satin – The Moody Blues – 5:54
16. I Can See Clearly Now – Johnny Nash – 2:50
17. Without You – Harry Nilsson – 3:21
18. I Saw the Light – Todd Rundgren – 3:00
19. Layla – Derek & the Dominos – 7:06

=== Sounds of the Seventies: 1973 ===
1. Loves Me Like a Rock – Paul Simon – 3:30
2. Superfly – Curtis Mayfield – 3:56
3. We're an American Band – Grand Funk Railroad – 3:29
4. Goodbye Yellow Brick Road – Elton John – 3:16
5. Could It Be I'm Falling in Love – Spinners – 4:13
6. Love Train – O'Jays – 3:01
7. Brother Louie – Stories – 3:57
8. Long Train Runnin' – Doobie Brothers – 3:28
9. Ain't No Woman (Like the One I've Got)– Four Tops – 3:11
10. Midnight Train to Georgia – Gladys Knight & The Pips – 4:41
11. Right Place, Wrong Time – Dr. John – 2:51
12. The Cisco Kid – War – 3:53
13. Hello It's Me – Todd Rundgren – 3:40
14. Diamond Girl – Seals & Crofts – 3:56
15. Stuck in the Middle with You – Stealers Wheel – 3:27
16. Smoke on the Water (edited live version) – Deep Purple – 4:33
17. Ramblin' Man – Allman Brothers Band – 4:57
18. Let's Get It On – Marvin Gaye – 4:03
19. Walk on the Wild Side – Lou Reed – 4:12

=== Sounds of the Seventies: 1974 ===
1. Can't Get Enough – Bad Company – 3:33
2. Show and Tell – Al Wilson – 3:30
3. Come and Get Your Love – Redbone – 3:34
4. I Shot the Sheriff – Eric Clapton – 3:34
5. Help Me – Joni Mitchell – 3:23
6. I Can Help – Billy Swan – 2:59
7. Sha-La-La (Make Me Happy) – Al Green – 2:59
8. Rock the Boat – The Hues Corporation – 3:08
9. Bennie and the Jets – Elton John – 5:21
10. Midnight Rider – Gregg Allman – 4:29
11. Sweet Home Alabama – Lynyrd Skynyrd – 4:44
12. The Loco-Motion – Grand Funk Railroad – 2:49
13. Smokin' in the Boys' Room – Brownsville Station – 2:59
14. Rikki Don't Lose That Number – Steely Dan – 4:00
15. Rock On – David Essex – 3:27
16. Midnight at the Oasis – Maria Muldaur – 3:40
17. Kung Fu Fighting – Carl Douglas – 3:19
18. Keep On Smilin' – Wet Willie – 3:27
19. Then Came You – Dionne Warwick & The Spinners – 3:57
20. The Bitch Is Back – Elton John – 3:38

=== Sounds of the Seventies: 1975 ===
1. You're No Good – Linda Ronstadt – 3:42
2. Jackie Blue – Ozark Mountain Daredevils – 3:38
3. That's the Way (I Like It) – KC & the Sunshine Band – 3:03
4. Must of Got Lost – J. Geils Band – 2:59
5. Why Can't We Be Friends? – War – 3:52
6. Sister Golden Hair – America – 3:21
7. Philadelphia Freedom – Elton John – 5:29
8. Black Water – Doobie Brothers – 4:17
9. Love Is a Rose – Linda Ronstadt – 2:46
10. How Long – Ace – 3:23
11. Dance with Me – Orleans – 3:02
12. Free Bird – Lynyrd Skynyrd – 4:44
13. You Are So Beautiful – Joe Cocker – 2:45
14. Feel Like Makin' Love – Bad Company – 5:12
15. Lady Marmalade – Labelle – 3:19
16. Pick Up the Pieces – Average White Band – 3:58
17. Island Girl – Elton John – 3:46
18. Some Kind of Wonderful – Grand Funk Railroad – 3:22
19. The Hustle – Van McCoy & Soul City Symphony – 3:28
20. Let's Do It Again – Staple Singers – 3:27

=== Sounds of the Seventies: 1976 ===
1. Rock 'N Me – Steve Miller Band – 3:09
2. Takin' It to the Streets – The Doobie Brothers – 3:48
3. Fooled Around and Fell in Love – Elvin Bishop – 2:59
4. Sara Smile – Hall & Oates – 3:12
5. Say You Love Me – Fleetwood Mac – 4:01
6. Play That Funky Music – Wild Cherry – 3:17
7. You Should Be Dancing – Bee Gees – 4:17
8. Show Me the Way – Peter Frampton – 3:36
9. Don't Go Breaking My Heart – Elton John, Kiki Dee – 4:25
10. Tonight's the Night (Gonna Be Alright) – Rod Stewart – 3:55
11. Love to Love You Baby – Donna Summer – 4:56
12. Still the One – Orleans – 3:56
13. Hello Old Friend – Eric Clapton – 3:05
14. Get Closer – Seals and Crofts – 3:58
15. 50 Ways to Leave Your Lover – Paul Simon – 3:40
16. That'll Be the Day – Linda Ronstadt – 2:33
17. Welcome Back – John Sebastian – 2:53
18. Dream Weaver – Gary Wright – 3:44
19. All by Myself – Eric Carmen – 4:54
20. The Rubberband Man – Spinners – 3:33

=== Sounds of the Seventies: 1977 ===
1. Got to Give It Up – Marvin Gaye – 4:14
2. Dancing Queen – ABBA – 3:51 (CD version) / Serpentine Fire – Earth, Wind and Fire – 3:52 (Cassette version)
3. Dreams – Fleetwood Mac – 4:15
4. Cold as Ice – Foreigner – 3:20
5. Blinded by the Light – Manfred Mann's Earth Band – 3:49
6. Fly Like an Eagle – The Steve Miller Band – 3:02
7. Southern Nights – Glen Campbell – 2:59
8. Heard It in a Love Song – Marshall Tucker Band – 3:29
9. Blue Bayou – Linda Ronstadt – 3:53
10. How Deep Is Your Love – Bee Gees – 3:38
11. Handy Man – James Taylor – 3:17
12. Rich Girl – Hall & Oates – 2:22
13. The Things We Do for Love – 10cc – 3:32
14. Year of the Cat – Al Stewart – 4:36
15. It's So Easy – Linda Ronstadt – 2:27
16. Feels Like the First Time – Foreigner – 3:29
17. I'm in You – Peter Frampton – 4:10
18. So into You – Atlanta Rhythm Section – 3:17
19. Stayin' Alive – Bee Gees – 3:42
20. Slip Slidin' Away – Paul Simon – 4:46

=== Sounds of the Seventies: 1978 ===
1. Werewolves of London – Warren Zevon – 3:31
2. Baby Hold On – Eddie Money – 3:33
3. Because the Night – Patti Smith Group – 3:22
4. Two Out of Three Ain't Bad – Meat Loaf – 5:25
5. Hot Child in the City – Nick Gilder – 3:08
6. Lay Down Sally – Eric Clapton – 3:32
7. Hot Blooded – Foreigner – 3:04
8. Life's Been Good – Joe Walsh – 4:41
9. Peg – Steely Dan – 3:58
10. Use ta Be My Girl – O'Jays – 3:22
11. We Are the Champions – Queen – 3:01
12. Night Fever – Bee Gees – 3:35
13. I Love the Nightlife (Disco 'Round) – Alicia Bridges – 3:11
14. Kiss You All Over – Exile – 3:30
15. Short People – Randy Newman – 2:56
16. Dust in the Wind – Kansas – 3:27
17. Le Freak – Chic – 3:35
18. Double Vision – Foreigner – 3:32
19. You're in My Heart (The Final Acclaim) – Rod Stewart – 4:29
20. Ooh Baby Baby – Linda Ronstadt – 3:15

=== Sounds of the Seventies: 1979 ===
1. Good Times – Chic – 3:44
2. Fire – Pointer Sisters – 3:28
3. We Are Family – Sister Sledge – 3:37
4. You're Only Lonely – JD Souther – 3:47
5. I Want You to Want Me – Cheap Trick – 3:39
6. Too Much Heaven – Bee Gees – 4:57
7. Don't Bring Me Down – Electric Light Orchestra – 4:04
8. Ring My Bell – Anita Ward – 3:32
9. Reunited – Peaches & Herb – 4:00
10. Bad Girls – Donna Summer – 3:54
11. Da Ya Think I'm Sexy? – Rod Stewart – 5:26
12. I Will Survive – Gloria Gaynor – 3:19
13. Rock 'N' Roll Fantasy – Bad Company – 3:19
14. Heart of Glass – Blondie – 3:26
15. Tragedy – Bee Gees – 5:04
16. My Sharona – The Knack – 4:00
17. Promises – Eric Clapton – 3:01
18. What a Fool Believes – Doobie Brothers – 3:43

=== Sounds of the Seventies: 1970 – Take Two ===
1. I Want You Back – Jackson Five – 2:56
2. Ball of Confusion (That's What the World Is Today) – Temptations – 4:05
3. Get Ready – Rare Earth – 2:47
4. Mississippi Queen – Mountain – 2:30
5. Evil Ways – Santana – 3:14
6. Spill the Wine – Eric Burdon and War – 4:53
7. Venus – Shocking Blue – 2:59
8. No Time – The Guess Who – 3:49
9. Closer to Home – Grand Funk Railroad – 5:31
10. Question – Moody Blues – 4:55
11. Let's Work Together – Canned Heat – 2:48
12. Walk a Mile in My Shoes – Joe South – 3:43
13. Up on Cripple Creek – The Band – 3:33
14. In the Summertime – Mungo Jerry – 3:30
15. Vehicle – The Ides of March – 2:55
16. Hey There Lonely Girl – Eddie Holman – 3:34
17. Turn Back the Hands of Time – Tyrone Davis – 2:57
18. Cry Me a River – Joe Cocker – 3:55
19. The Thrill Is Gone – B.B. King – 4:07
20. Don't Play That Song – Aretha Franklin – 2:58
21. Rainy Night in Georgia – Brook Benton – 3:36

=== Sounds of the Seventies: 1971 – Take Two ===
1. Mercy Mercy Me (The Ecology) – Marvin Gaye – 3:15
2. Respect Yourself – Staple Singers – 3:33
3. Blue Money – Van Morrison – 3:44
4. Mr. Big Stuff – Jean Knight – 2:45
5. Theme from Shaft – Isaac Hayes – 3:16
6. Smiling Faces Sometimes – Undisputed Truth – 3:16
7. Whatcha See Is Whatcha Get – The Dramatics – 3:36
8. I Just Want to Celebrate – Rare Earth – 2:54
9. High Time We Went – Joe Cocker – 4:30
10. The Night They Drove Old Dixie Down – Joan Baez – 3:22
11. Never Ending Song of Love – Delaney & Bonnie – 2:42
12. Sooner or Later – The Grass Roots – 2:41
13. Treat Her Like a Lady – Cornelius Brothers and Sister Rose – 2:46
14. Indian Reservation – Paul Revere & the Raiders – 2:53
15. Draggin' the Line – Tommy James – 2:46
16. Liar – Three Dog Night – 3:40
17. We Gotta Get You a Woman – Todd Rundgren – 3:08
18. Have You Seen Her – The Chi-Lites – 5:12
19. Here Comes the Sun – Richie Havens – 3:48
20. Woodstock – Matthews Southern Comfort – 4:28
21. Lucky Man – Emerson, Lake & Palmer – 4:36

=== Sounds of the Seventies: 1972 – Take Two ===
1. Clean Up Woman – Betty Wright – 2:48
2. Too Late to Turn Back Now – Cornelius Brothers and Sister Rose – 3:19
3. I'm Still in Love with You – Al Green – 3:12
4. Mother and Child Reunion – Paul Simon – 3:05
5. Brandy (You're a Fine Girl) – Looking Glass – 2:56
6. Tight Rope – Leon Russell – 3:00
7. Hot Rod Lincoln – Commander Cody and His Lost Planet Airmen – 2:42
8. Rock and Roll (Part Two) – Gary Glitter – 3:00
9. Get It On – T. Rex – 4:25
10. All the Young Dudes – Mott the Hoople – 3:33
11. If You Don't Know Me by Now – Harold Melvin & the Blue Notes – 3:27
12. Papa Was a Rollin' Stone – The Temptations – 6:57
13. Freddie's Dead (From Superfly) – Curtis Mayfield – 3:21
14. You Don't Mess Around With Jim – Jim Croce – 3:00
15. Use Me – Bill Withers – 3:46
16. Everybody Plays the Fool – Main Ingredient – 3:22
17. Summer Breeze – Seals & Crofts – 3:25
18. Ventura Highway – America – 3:32
19. Roundabout – Yes – 3:27
20. You Wear It Well – Rod Stewart – 4:21

=== Sounds of the Seventies: 1973 – Take Two ===
1. Call Me (Come Back Home) – Al Green – 3:04
2. Drift Away – Dobie Gray – 3:56
3. Stir It Up – Johnny Nash – 3:03
4. Do It Again – Steely Dan – 4:12
5. Shambala – Three Dog Night – 3:24
6. Kodachrome – Paul Simon – 3:33
7. Bad, Bad Leroy Brown – Jim Croce – 2:59
8. Will It Go Round in Circles – Billy Preston – 3:44
9. Yes We Can Can – Pointer Sisters – 4:16
10. Neither One of Us (Wants to Be the First to Say Goodbye) – Gladys Knight & the Pips – 4:22
11. Trouble Man – Marvin Gaye – 3:50
12. The World Is a Ghetto – War – 4:04
13. Reeling in the Years – Steely Dan – 4:32
14. China Grove – The Doobie Brothers – 3:15
15. Don't Let Me Be Lonely Tonight – James Taylor – 2:35
16. Free Ride – Edgar Winter Group – 3:06
17. Living in the Past – Jethro Tull – 3:20
18. I'm Just a Singer (In a Rock and Roll Band) – The Moody Blues – 4:16
19. One of a Kind (Love Affair) – The Spinners – 3:19
20. Why Can't We Live Together – Timmy Thomas – 3:53

=== Sounds of the Seventies: 1974 – Take Two ===
1. Lookin' for a Love – Bobby Womack – 2:37
2. You Ain't Seen Nothing Yet – Bachman-Turner Overdrive – 3:38
3. The Joker – Steve Miller Band – 3:36
4. Until You Come Back to Me (That's What I'm Gonna Do) – Aretha Franklin – 3:26
5. Can't Get Enough of Your Love, Babe – Barry White – 3:46
6. Mockingbird – Carly Simon with James Taylor – 4:11
7. I've Got to Use My Imagination – Gladys Knight & The Pips – 3:32
8. Sundown – Gordon Lightfoot – 3:34
9. Everlasting Love – Carl Carlton – 2:36
10. Shinin' On – Grand Funk Railroad – 3:29
11. Rock and Roll, Hoochie Koo – Rick Derringer – 2:57
12. Takin' Care of Business – Bachman-Turner Overdrive – 4:53
13. Rock Your Baby – George McCrae – 3:21
14. Sideshow – Blue Magic – 4:10
15. Haven't Got Time for the Pain – Carly Simon – 3:51
16. Tin Man – America – 3:27
17. Dancing Machine – Jackson Five – 2:37
18. Jungle Boogie – Kool & the Gang – 3:05
19. Nothing from Nothing – Billy Preston – 2:38
20. I'll Have to Say I Love You in a Song – Jim Croce – 2:32
21. Radar Love – Golden Earring – 5:02

=== Sounds of the Seventies: 1975 – Take Two ===
1. When Will I Be Loved – Linda Ronstadt – 2:07
2. Bad Time – Grand Funk Railroad – 2:56
3. Roll On Down the Highway – Bachman-Turner Overdrive – 3:57
4. Movin' On – Bad Company – 3:22
5. Take Me in Your Arms (Rock Me a Little While) – The Doobie Brothers – 3:42
6. They Just Can't Stop It (The Games People Play) – The Spinners – 3:27
7. L-O-V-E (Love) – Al Green – 3:06
8. Shining Star – Earth, Wind & Fire – 2:53
9. Get Down Tonight – KC & the Sunshine Band – 3:13
10. I'm on Fire – Dwight Twilley – 3:17
11. SOS – ABBA – 3:22
12. Shame, Shame, Shame – Shirley & Company – 4:02
13. Cut the Cake – Average White Band – 3:39
14. You're the First, the Last, My Everything – Barry White – 3:34
15. Low Rider – War – 3:03
16. Fight the Power (Part 1 & 2) – Isley Brothers – 3:17
17. Bungle in the Jungle – Jethro Tull – 3:33
18. Only Women Bleed – Alice Cooper – 3:32
19. Can't Get It Out of My Head – Electric Light Orchestra – 3:08
20. Poetry Man – Phoebe Snow – 4:37
21. I'm Not in Love – 10CC – 3:47

=== Sounds of the Seventies: 1976 – Take Two ===
1. (Don't Fear) The Reaper – Blue Öyster Cult – 3:53
2. The Boys Are Back in Town – Thin Lizzy – 3:37
3. Sweet Thing – Rufus – 3:23
4. Give Up the Funk (Tear the Roof off the Sucker) – Parliament – 3:41
5. Still Crazy After All These Years – Paul Simon – 3:27
6. Love is Alive – Gary Wright – 3:28
7. Love Hangover – Diana Ross – 3:51
8. (Shake, Shake, Shake) Shake Your Booty – KC & the Sunshine Band – 3:05
9. Take the Money and Run – Steve Miller Band – 2:52
10. Young Blood – Bad Company – 2:40
11. Evil Woman – Electric Light Orchestra – 3:28
12. Love Is the Drug – Roxy Music – 4:00
13. Right Back Where We Started From – Maxine Nightingale – 3:17
14. Disco Lady – Johnnie Taylor – 4:31
15. You Sexy Thing – Hot Chocolate – 3:34
16. I'll Be Good to You – The Brothers Johnson – 3:32
17. Beth – Kiss – 2:47
18. Slow Ride – Foghat – 3:59
19. Baby, I Love Your Way – Peter Frampton – 3:39
20. She's Gone – Hall & Oates – 3:28
21. Misty Blue – Dorothy Moore – 3:35

=== Sounds of the Seventies: 1977 – Take Two ===
1. Best of My Love – The Emotions – 3:42
2. I'm Your Boogie Man – KC & the Sunshine Band – 4:03
3. Runaway – Bonnie Raitt – 3:25
4. Black Betty – Ram Jam – 2:32
5. Couldn't Get It Right – Climax Blues Band – 3:04
6. Jet Airliner – Steve Miller Band – 3:34
7. Isn't It Time – The Babys – 3:24
8. Telephone Line – Electric Light Orchestra – 4:42
9. Car Wash – Rose Royce – 3:16
10. Float On – The Floaters – 4:13
11. It's Ecstasy When You Lay Down Next to Me – Barry White – 3:36
12. Whatcha Gonna Do? – Pablo Cruise – 4:17
13. You Make Me Feel Like Dancing – Leo Sayer – 2:52
14. Sleepwalker – Kinks – 4:04
15. Do Ya – Electric Light Orchestra – 3:47
16. Boogie Nights – Heatwave – 3:38
17. Smoke from a Distant Fire – Sanford-Townsend Band – 3:34
18. Brick House – Commodores – 3:29
19. (Every Time I Turn Around) Back in Love Again – L.T.D. – 3:43
20. Don't Leave Me This Way – Thelma Houston – 3:38

=== Sounds of the Seventies: 1978 – Take Two ===
1. Disco Inferno – Trammps – 3:33
2. I'm Every Woman – Chaka Khan – 3:32
3. Grease – Frankie Valli – 3:21
4. It's a Heartache – Bonnie Tyler – 3:32
5. Wonderful Tonight – Eric Clapton – 3:09
6. Just What I Needed – The Cars – 3:44
7. A Rock 'N' Roll Fantasy – Kinks – 4:59
8. What's Your Name – Lynyrd Skynyrd – 3:32
9. Jack and Jill – Raydio – 3:34
10. The Groove Line – Heatwave – 4:17
11. September – Earth, Wind & Fire – 3:36
12. Flash Light – Parliament – 4:24
13. Reminiscing – Little River Band – 3:29
14. Baby Come Back – Player – 3:31
15. Imaginary Lover – Atlanta Rhythm Section – 4:09
16. Back in the U.S.A. – Linda Ronstadt – 2:58
17. Can We Still Be Friends – Todd Rundgren – 3:10
18. Strange Way – Firefall – 3:56
19. Follow You, Follow Me – Genesis – 3:20
20. You Belong to Me – Carly Simon – 3:12

=== Sounds of the Seventies: 1979 – Take Two ===
1. Let's Go – The Cars – 3:34
2. Dirty White Boy – Foreigner – 3:40
3. One Way or Another – Blondie – 3:28
4. Chuck E.'s In Love – Rickie Lee Jones – 3:28
5. Cruisin' – Smokey Robinson – 4:22
6. Minute by Minute – Doobie Brothers – 3:27
7. You Can't Change That – Raydio – 3:24
8. After the Love Has Gone – Earth, Wind & Fire – 3:56
9. Good Girls Don't – The Knack – 3:08
10. I Can't Stand It No More – Peter Frampton – 3:50
11. Head Games – Foreigner – 3:38
12. Everytime I Think of You – The Babys – 3:50
13. Every 1's a Winner – Hot Chocolate – 3:57
14. Found a Cure – Ashford & Simpson – 3:45
15. Livin' It Up (Friday Night) – Bell & James – 3:21
16. Shake Your Groove Thing – Peaches & Herb – 3:27
17. Y.M.C.A. – Village People – 4:03
18. Is She Really Going Out With Him? – Joe Jackson – 3:35
19. Heaven Must Have Sent You – Bonnie Pointer – 3:32
20. Lotta Love – Nicolette Larson – 3:09

=== Sounds of the Seventies: Rock 'N' Soul Seventies ===
1. Go Back – Crabby Appleton – 3:00
2. Hold the Line – Toto – 3:31
3. So Very Hard to Go – Tower of Power – 3:40
4. Long, Long Way from Home – Foreigner – 2:50
5. Anticipation – Carly Simon – 3:19
6. Here I Am (Come and Take Me) – Al Green – 4:17
7. Union Man – Cate Brothers – 4:48
8. Skin Tight – Ohio Players – 2:51
9. (If Loving You Is Wrong) I Don't Want to Be Right – Luther Ingram – 3:26
10. Me and Mrs. Jones – Billy Paul – 4:47
11. Give Me Just a Little More Time – Chairmen of the Board – 2:38
12. She's Not Just Another Woman – 8th Day – 3:14
13. Thunder and Lightning – Chi Coltrane – 3:02
14. Hey Lawdy Mama – Steppenwolf – 2:54
15. Frankenstein – Edgar Winter Group – 3:25
16. Strange Magic – Electric Light Orchestra – 4:31
17. Magic – Pilot – 3:03
18. Cruel to Be Kind – Nick Lowe – 3:29
19. City of New Orleans – Arlo Guthrie – 4:30
20. Crazy Mama – J. J. Cale – 2:28
21. Ain't No Mountain High Enough – Diana Ross – 3:28

=== Sounds of the Seventies: Seventies Top Forty ===
1. I'll Be Around – Spinners – 3:12
2. Thin Line Between Love and Hate – The Persuaders – 3:19
3. Groove Me – King Floyd – 2:58
4. Starting All Over Again – Mel & Tim – 3:27
5. Band of Gold – Freda Payne – 2:54
6. Didn't I (Blow Your Mind This Time) – Delfonics – 3:22
7. Fire – Ohio Players – 3:14
8. I'd Love to Change the World – Ten Years After – 3:43
9. Little Willy – Sweet – 3:14
10. I Wanna Be With You – Raspberries – 3:05
11. Devil Woman – Cliff Richard – 3:37
12. My Best Friend's Girl – The Cars – 3:45
13. Yellow River – Christie – 2:46
14. No More Mr. Nice Guy – Alice Cooper – 3:06
15. Footstompin' Music – Grand Funk Railroad – 3:47
16. That's the Way I've Always Heard It Should Be – Carly Simon – 4:16
17. Sylvia's Mother – Dr. Hook & the Medicine Show – 3:41
18. I Gotcha – Joe Tex – 2:27
19. Spiders and Snakes – Jim Stafford – 3:04
20. There Goes Another Love Song – Outlaws – 3:05
21. Highway Song – Blackfoot – 7:01

=== Sounds of the Seventies: Guitar Power ===
1. Cat Scratch Fever – Ted Nugent – 3:06
2. Saturday Night Special – Lynyrd Skynyrd – 5:07
3. Let It Ride – Bachman-Turner Overdrive – 4:26
4. Lady Love – Robin Trower – 3:19
5. Paranoid – Black Sabbath – 2:49
6. Statesboro Blues – Allman Brothers Band – 4:19
7. Ready for Love – Bad Company – 4:59
8. Locomotive Breath – Jethro Tull – 4:25
9. Under My Wheels – Alice Cooper – 2:50
10. Why Does Love Got to Be So Sad? – Derek & the Dominos – 4:44
11. Ride With Me – Steppenwolf – 3:24
12. Blues Power – Eric Clapton – 3:04
13. Black Night – Deep Purple – 3:02
14. Train, Train – Blackfoot – 3:36
15. Juke Box Music – Kinks – 5:34
16. Rocky Mountain Way – Joe Walsh – 5:13
17. Blue Morning, Blue Day – Foreigner – 3:10
18. Beggars Day – Crazy Horse – 4:27

=== Sounds of the Seventies: FM Rock, Vol. 1 ===
1. All the Way from Memphis – Mott the Hoople – 4:58
2. Going to Mexico – Steve Miller Band – 2:27
3. Gypsy Wedding – Moby Grape – 2:22
4. Gone Dead Train – Crazy Horse – 4:06
5. Willin' – Little Feat – 2:56
6. The Shape I'm In – The Band – 4:00
7. Sugar Magnolia – Grateful Dead – 3:15
8. (Is Anybody Going To) San Antone – Doug Sahm & Texas Tornados – 3:10
9. Empty Pages – Traffic – 4:35
10. Satellite of Love – Lou Reed – 3:39
11. Jewel Eyed Judy – Fleetwood Mac – 3:18
12. The Harder They Come – Jimmy Cliff – 3:06
13. Every Picture Tells a Story – Rod Stewart – 5:55
14. Chestnut Mare – The Byrds – 5:08
15. The Story in Your Eyes – Moody Blues – 2:57
16. Do the Strand – Roxy Music – 4:00
17. Jeepster – T. Rex – 4:11
18. Rockin' Down the Highway – Doobie Brothers – 3:20
19. Sail Away – Randy Newman – 2:50

=== Sounds of the Seventies: FM Rock, Vol. 2 ===
1. Superstition – Beck, Bogert & Appice – 4:20
2. Everybody's Everything – Santana – 3:29
3. Casey Jones – Grateful Dead – 4:28
4. Cross-Eyed Mary – Jethro Tull – 4:10
5. Click Clack – Captain Beefheart – 3:35
6. Nature's Way – Spirit – 2:33
7. Rock & Roll Stew – Traffic – 4:19
8. Only You Know and I Know – Dave Mason – 4:08
9. I Talk to the Wind – King Crimson – 6:09
10. Wishing Well – Free – 3:36
11. Hard Drivin' Man – J. Geils Band – 2:19
12. Teenage Head – Flamin' Groovies – 2:51
13. Rock & Roll – Velvet Underground – 4:40
14. Life Is a Carnival – The Band – 3:56
15. You Better Think Twice – Poco – 3:24
16. Johnny Strikes Up the Band – Warren Zevon – 2:50
17. Reason to Believe – Rod Stewart – 4:07
18. Oh Well – Fleetwood Mac – 9:00

=== Sounds of the Seventies: FM Rock, Vol. 3 ===
1. Aqualung – Jethro Tull – 6:32
2. Take Me to the Pilot – Elton John – 3:46
3. Roll Away the Stone – Mott the Hoople – 3:07
4. The Bomber: Closet Queen/Cast Your Fate to the Wind – James Gang – 5:37
5. Long Distance Runaround – Yes – 3:34
6. Out of the Blue – Roxy Music – 4:46
7. Momamma Scuba – John Cale – 4:23
8. September Gurls – Big Star – 2:49
9. Moon Tears – Grin – 2:21
10. D.O.A. – Bloodrock – 4:34
11. Highway 61 Revisited – Johnny Winter – 5:06
12. Bringing Home the Bacon – Procol Harum – 4:20
13. Blue Sky – Allman Brothers Band – 5:11
14. Oh, Atlanta – Little Feat – 3:32
15. Panama Red – New Riders of the Purple Sage – 2:46
16. Stranger in a Strange Land – Leon Russell – 4:03
17. California – Joni Mitchell – 3:49
18. Angel from Montgomery – John Prine – 3:41

=== Sounds of the Seventies: FM Rock, Vol. 4 ===
1. Keep Playin' That Rock 'n' Roll – Edgar Winter's White Trash – 3:47
2. I Know a Little – Lynyrd Skynyrd – 3:30
3. Shooting Star – Bad Company – 6:15
4. Space Truckin' – Deep Purple – 4:35
5. Hope You're Feeling Better – Santana – 4:13
6. Nothin' to Do But Today – Stephen Stills – 2:41
7. Giving It All Away – Roger Daltrey – 3:35
8. American Girl – Roger McGuinn – 4:30
9. Surf's Up – Beach Boys – 4:12
10. Broken English – Marianne Faithfull – 4:38
11. Vicious – Lou Reed – 2:59
12. Sneakin' Sally Through the Alley – Robert Palmer – 4:26
13. (You Got to Walk And) Don't Look Back – Peter Tosh – 3:48
14. Hokey Pokey (The Ice Cream Song) – Richard and Linda Thompson – 3:24
15. Comin' Home – Delaney & Bonnie & Friends – 3:14
16. Return of the Grievous Angel – Gram Parsons – 4:26
17. Bare Trees – Fleetwood Mac – 5:05
18. Bridge of Sighs – Robin Trower – 5:01

=== Sounds of the Seventies: Seventies Generation ===
1. Groovy Situation – Gene Chandler – 3:13
2. Want Ads – Honey Cone – 2:46
3. Somebody's Been Sleeping – 100 Proof (Aged in Soul) – 2:47
4. In the Rain – Dramatics – 5:09
5. Shower the People – James Taylor – 3:57
6. You're So Vain – Carly Simon – 4:17
7. Champagne Jam – Atlanta Rhythm Section – 4:35
8. Lady Blue – Leon Russell – 3:32
9. Fallin' in Love – Souther-Hillman-Furay Band – 3:31
10. Girls Talk – Dave Edmunds – 3:24
11. Saturday Night – Bay City Rollers – 2:56
12. Run Run Run – Jo Jo Gunne – 2:35
13. Easy Livin' – Uriah Heep – 2:37
14. Walk Like a Man (You Can Call Me Your Man) – Grand Funk Railroad – 3:25
15. The Air That I Breathe – The Hollies – 3:48
16. One Fine Morning – Lighthouse – 5:16
17. Tumbling Dice – Linda Ronstadt – 3:02
18. Love Rollercoaster – Ohio Players – 2:53
19. Tell Me Something Good – Rufus – 3:32
20. I've Been Lonely for So Long – Frederick Knight – 3:15
21. Dance Away – Roxy Music – 3:17

=== Sounds of the Seventies: Dance Fever ===
1. Dance, Dance, Dance (Yowsah, Yowsah, Yowsah) – Chic – 3:45
2. Boogie Oogie Oogie – A Taste of Honey – 3:39
3. Do It ('Til You're Satisfied) – B.T. Express – 5:44
4. The Love I Lost, Pt. 1 – Harold Melvin & the Blue Notes – 3:45
5. Get Up Offa That Thing, Pt. 1 – James Brown – 4:12
6. If I Can't Have You – Yvonne Elliman – 3:02
7. He's the Greatest Dancer – Sister Sledge – 3:37
8. Boogie Fever – Sylvers – 3:29
9. Mighty Mighty – Earth, Wind & Fire – 3:04
10. Fly, Robin, Fly – Silver Convention – 3:20
11. Hot Stuff – Donna Summer – 4:29
12. Turn the Beat Around – Vicki Sue Robinson – 3:26
13. Heaven Must Be Missing an Angel, Pt. 1 – Tavares – 3:33
14. TSOP (The Sound of Philadelphia) – MFSB & The Three Degrees – 3:36
15. Keep It Comin' Love – KC and the Sunshine Band – 3:53
16. Bustin' Loose – Chuck Brown & the Soul Searchers – 3:48
17. One Nation Under a Groove, Pt. 1 – Funkadelic – 4:16
18. Get Off – Foxy – 3:35
19. Working My Way Back to You/Forgive Me, Girl – Spinners – 4:02

=== Sounds of the Seventies: Punk and New Wave ===
1. Anarchy in the U.K. – Sex Pistols – 3:33
2. Search and Destroy – Iggy & the Stooges – 3:26
3. Blitzkrieg Bop – Ramones – 2:14
4. The Modern World – Jam – 2:34
5. Blank Generation – Richard Hell & The Voidoids – 2:44
6. See No Evil – Television – 3:52
7. Gloria – Patti Smith – 5:53
8. Roadrunner – The Modern Lovers – 4:07
9. Rock Lobster – B-52's – 4:38
10. Human Fly – The Cramps – 2:15
11. Heart of the City – Nick Lowe – 2:03
12. Radio, Radio – Elvis Costello – 3:08
13. I Knew the Bride (When She Used to Rock & Roll) – Dave Edmunds – 2:57
14. Thank You Friends – Big Star – 3:06
15. X Offender – Blondie – 3:10
16. Sex & Drugs & Rock & Roll – Ian Dury & the Blockheads – 3:12
17. Psycho Killer – Talking Heads – 4:22
18. Jocko Homo – Devo – 3:22
19. The Modern Dance – Pere Ubu – 3:32
20. Sonic Reducer – Dead Boys – 3:07
21. Red Temple Prayer (Two Headed Dog) – Roky Erickson & Bleibalien – 3:33

=== Sounds of the Seventies: AM Top Twenty ===
1. Hooked on a Feeling – Blue Swede – 2:54
2. Hitchin' a Ride – Vanity Fare – 3:05
3. The Night Chicago Died – Paper Lace – 3:32
4. How Do You Do – Mouth & MacNeal – 3:15
5. Chevy Van – Sammy Johns – 2:59
6. Dancing in the Moonlight – King Harvest – 2:52
7. Rock Me Gently – Andy Kim – 3:29
8. Jungle Fever – Chakachas – 4:25
9. I'm Doin' Fine Now – New York City – 2:52
10. Moonlight Feels Right – Starbuck – 3:37
11. Afternoon Delight – Starland Vocal Band – 3:14
12. Beach Baby – The First Class – 5:02
13. Sky High – Jigsaw – 2:49
14. Seasons in the Sun – Terry Jacks – 3:30
15. Billy Don't Be a Hero – Bo Donaldson & the Heywoods – 3:40
16. Tighter, Tighter – Alive N Kickin' – 2:45
17. Beautiful Sunday – Daniel Boone – 3:02
18. My Baby Loves Lovin' – White Plains – 2:59
19. Run Joey Run – David Geddes – 2:55
20. One Tin Soldier The legend of Billy Jack – Coven – 3:23
21. Rings – Cymarron – 2:32
22. Shannon – Henry Gross – 3:49

=== Sounds of the Seventies: AM Pop Classics ===
1. Nice to Be with You – Gallery – 2:40
2. I'd Like To Teach The World To Sing (In Perfect Harmony) – New Seekers – 2:25
3. Me and You and a Dog Named Boo – Lobo – 2:53
4. Wildfire – Michael Martin Murphey – 3:15
5. Here Comes That Rainy Day Feeling Again – The Fortunes – 2:51
6. Precious and Few – Climax – 2:49
7. Little Green Bag – George Baker Selection – 3:19
8. Popcorn – Hot Butter – 2:34
9. Walking in Rhythm – Blackbyrds – 2:54
10. United We Stand – Brotherhood of Man – 2:54
11. Wildflower – Skylark – 4:10
12. Life Is a Rock (But the Radio Rolled Me) – Reunion – 3:35
13. Love Grows (Where My Rosemary Goes) – Edison Lighthouse – 2:49
14. Montego Bay – Bobby Bloom – 2:58
15. Don't Call Us, We'll Call You – Sugarloaf and Jerry Corbetta – 3:21
16. Troglodyte (Cave Man) – Jimmy Castor Bunch – 3:23
17. I Ain't Got Time Anymore – Glass Bottle – 2:26
18. White Lies, Blue Eyes – Bullet – 2:52
19. The Witch Queen of New Orleans – Redbone – 2:47
20. The Lion Sleeps Tonight – Robert John – 2:36
21. Lay a Little Lovin' on Me – Robin McNamara – 3:04
22. Be Thankful for What You Got – William DeVaughn – 3:20

=== Sounds of the Seventies: AM Pop Classics II ===
1. Gimme Dat Ding – The Pipkins – 2:14
2. Wham Bam (Shang-A-Lang)– Silver – 3:34
3. Rendezvous – Hudson Brothers – 3:20
4. Heartbeat, It's a Lovebeat – The DeFranco Family – 3:12
5. The Guitar Man – Bread – 3:45
6. Stay Awhile – The Bells – 3:25
7. Toast and Marmalade for Tea – Tin Tin – 2:25
8. I'll Meet You Halfway – The Partridge Family – 3:49
9. Say, Has Anybody Seen My Sweet Gypsy Rose – Dawn featuring Tony Orlando – 2:56
10. My Eyes Adored You – Frankie Valli – 3:28
11. Natural High – Bloodstone – 4:07
12. Never Been to Spain – Three Dog Night – 3:44
13. Eighteen with a Bullet – Pete Wingfield – 3:30
14. Rock and Roll Heaven – The Righteous Brothers – 3:33
15. Resurrection Shuffle – Ashton, Gardner & Dyke – 3:21
16. I'd Really Love to See You Tonight – England Dan & John Ford Coley – 2:36
17. Sad Sweet Dreamer – Sweet Sensation – 3:22
18. Laughter in the Rain – Neil Sedaka – 2:48
19. Rockin' Chair – Gwen McCrae – 3:19
20. Just Don't Want To Be Lonely – Main Ingredient – 3:38
21. Holdin' On to Yesterday – Ambrosia – 3:24
22. Softly Whispering I Love You – English Congregation – 2:57

=== Sounds of the Seventies: The Late '70s ===
1. Last Dance – Donna Summer – 3:22
2. In the Navy – Village People – 3:46
3. More Than a Feeling – Boston – 3:27
4. Magnet and Steel – Walter Egan – 3:22
5. Sad Eyes – Robert John – 3:32
6. Happy Days – Pratt & McClain – 2:37
7. Video Killed the Radio Star – Buggles – 3:22
8. Sharing the Night Together – Dr. Hook & The Medicine Show – 2:55
9. I Go Crazy – Paul Davis – 3:42
10. I Want You – Marvin Gaye – 3:57
11. Lovin' You – Minnie Riperton – 3:25
12. Making Our Dreams Come True – Cyndi Grecco – 2:32
13. Gold – John Stewart – 4:23
14. Dreaming – Blondie – 3:04
15. We Just Disagree – Dave Mason – 3:02
16. You Don't Have to Be a Star (To Be in My Show) – Marilyn McCoo & Billy Davis Jr. – 3:53
17. Kiss and Say Goodbye – Manhattans – 3:35
18. Lonely Boy – Andrew Gold – 3:58
19. Ebony Eyes – Bob Welch – 3:34
20. Right Time of the Night – Jennifer Warnes – 2:54
21. Undercover Angel – Alan O'Day – 3:27
22. Bluer Than Blue – Michael Johnson – 2:53

=== Sounds of the Seventies: AM Nuggets ===
1. King Tut – Steve Martin and The Toot Uncommons – 2:13
2. Ca Plane Pour Moi – Plastic Bertrand – 3:01
3. Sugar Baby Love – Rubettes – 3:32
4. I Feel Love – Donna Summer – 5:56
5. Love Will Find a Way – Pablo Cruise – 4:01
6. I Wanna Get Next to You – Rose Royce – 3:56
7. Sentimental Lady – Bob Welch – 2:56
8. Amie – Pure Prairie League – 3:17
9. Fire on the Mountain – Marshall Tucker Band – 3:09
10. Don't Look Back – Boston – 6:11
11. Hey Deanie – Shaun Cassidy – 3:41
12. You Made Me Believe in Magic – Bay City Rollers – 2:44
13. You Are the Woman – Firefall – 2:38
14. Torn Between Two Lovers – Mary MacGregor – 3:44
15. On and On – Stephen Bishop – 3:02
16. You and Me – Alice Cooper – 3:29
17. Thunder Island – Jay Ferguson – 3:26
18. He's Gonna Step on You Again – John Kongos – 4:30
19. Love Is in the Air – John Paul Young – 3:27
20. When You're in Love with a Beautiful Woman – Dr. Hook & The Medicine Show – 2:57
21. Just When I Needed You Most – Randy Van Warmer – 3:59

=== Sounds of the Seventies: More AM Nuggets ===
1. Love Will Keep Us Together – Captain & Tennille – 3:26
2. Doctor's Orders – Carol Douglas – 3:31
3. Got to Be Real – Cheryl Lynn – 3:45
4. I Want Your Love – Chic – 3:33
5. Shame – Evelyn Champagne King – 3:01
6. Mighty Love, Pt. 1 – Spinners – 3:22
7. You Little Trustmaker – The Tymes – 2:51
8. Star – Stealers Wheel – 3:02
9. Doesn't Somebody Want to Be Wanted – Partridge Family – 2:49
10. Playground in My Mind – Clint Holmes – 2:57
11. December, 1963 (Oh, What a Night) – Frankie Valli and the Four Seasons – 3:36
12. My Ding-A-Ling – Chuck Berry – 4:25
13. Music Box Dancer – Frank Mills – 3:19
14. Jump into the Fire – Harry Nilsson – 3:36
15. Funky Nassau, Pt. 1 – Beginning of the End – 3:13
16. Supernatural Thing, Pt. 1 – Ben E. King – 3:18
17. Summer – War – 4:02
18. Suavecito – Malo – 3:26
19. I've Found Someone of My Own – The Free Movement – 3:42
20. Joanne – Mike Nesmith & The First National Band – 3:13
21. Stand Tall – Burton Cummings – 3:20

=== Sounds of the Seventies: AM Heavy Hits ===
1. Carry on Wayward Son – Kansas – 5:24
2. Evil Woman (Don't Play Your Games With Me) – Crow – 3:15
3. Jesus Is Just Alright – Doobie Brothers – 4:36
4. Looking for a Love – J. Geils Band – 3:45
5. Good Lovin' Gone Bad – Bad Company – 3:38
6. Drivin' Wheel – Foghat – 5:13
7. Two Tickets to Paradise – Eddie Money – 4:00
8. Good Times Roll – The Cars – 3:48
9. Girl of My Dreams – Bram Tchaikovsky – 4:09
10. Are You Ready? – Pacific Gas & Electric – 5:51
11. The Stealer – Free – 2:36
12. Neanderthal Man – Hotlegs – 4:20
13. I Didn't Know I Loved You (Till I Saw You Rock and Roll) – Gary Glitter – 3:26
14. Overnight Sensation (Hit Record) – Raspberries – 5:25
15. Long Time – Boston – 3:04
16. (Wish I Could Fly Like) Superman – Kinks – 3:37
17. Welcome to My Nightmare – Alice Cooper – 5:16
18. Driver's Seat – Sniff 'n' the Tears – 3:42

=== Sounds of the Seventies: Pop Nuggets – Late '70s ===
1. Pop Muzik – M – 3:23
2. Saturday Night – Bay City Rollers – 2:57
3. Undercover Angel – Alan O'Day – 3:28
4. Escape (The Pina Colada Song) – Rupert Holmes – 3:55
5. Love Rollercoaster – The Ohio Players – 2:54
6. Do That To Me One More Time – Captain & Tennille – 3:55
7. Thunder Island – Jay Ferguson – 3:31
8. When You're in Love with a Beautiful Woman – Dr. Hook & The Medicine Show – 3:00
9. Sad Eyes – Robert John – 3:33
10. How Much I Feel – Ambrosia – 4:49
11. Boogie Fever – The Sylvers – 3:30
12. Fly, Robin, Fly – Silver Convention – 3:20
13. You Don't Have To Be A Star (To Be In My Show) – Marilyn McCoo & Billy Davis Jr. – 4:00
14. I'd Really Love to See You Tonight – England Dan & John Ford Coley – 2:39
15. Lonely Boy – Andrew Gold – 4:02
16. Wildfire – Michael Martin Murphey – 3:20
17. Rhinestone Cowboy – Glen Campbell – 3:14
18. Amie – Pure Prairie League – 4:21
19. Right Time of the Night – Jennifer Warnes – 2:54
20. Just When I Needed You Most – Randy VanWarmer – 4:02

=== Sounds of the Seventies: Celebration ===
1. Maniac – Michael Sembello
2. Celebration – Kool & The Gang
3. I'm So Excited – Pointer Sisters
4. Call Me – Blondie
5. Fame – Irene Cara
6. Upside Down – Diana Ross
7. Physical – Olivia Newton-John
8. More More More, Part 1 – Andrea True Connection
9. Right Back Where We Started From – Maxine Nightingale
10. Last Dance – Donna Summer
11. In the Navy – Village People
12. Gloria – Laura Branigan
13. (Shake, Shake, Shake) Shake Your Booty – K.C. & the Sunshine Band
14. Get Up and Boogie – Silver Convention
15. Funkytown – Lipps, Inc.
16. Shake Your Groove Thing – Peaches & Herb
17. Take Me Home – Cher
18. Shadow Dancing – Andy Gibb

Note: This album – which includes eight songs from 1980–1983 – was initially included as part of the series, but soon disconnected and sold as a separate album titled "Celebration" after customer complaints that the album had songs that did not fit the series.

== See also ==
- 1970s nostalgia
