= Poetry Man =

Single by Phoebe Snow

from the album Phoebe Snow
- B-side: "Either or Both"
- Released: December 1974
- Recorded: 1973
- Studio: A & R Recording (NYC)
- Genre: Blues, jazz, folk
- Length: 4:36 (album version); 3:15 (edited single)
- Label: Shelter Records
- Songwriter: Phoebe Snow
- Producer: Dino Airali

Phoebe Snow singles chronology
"Poetry Man" (1974)	"Harpo's Blues" (1975)

"Poetry Man" is a song by the American singer-songwriter Phoebe Snow. It was written by Snow, produced by Dino Airali, and first appeared on her 1974 self-titled debut album.

== Composition/ recording/ release ==
"Poetry Man" was the second song written by Phoebe Snow - (Phoebe Snow quote:)"The first one [was] so lame I hardly remember it". Snow would have the basic song written in five or ten minutes, and the song in its final form finished in about an hour. Snow would recall that the "bunch of hippies" she knew through their mutual participation in talent nights at Greenwich Village venues dismissed her composition as "pedestrian", advising Snow to "stick with the [Delta] blues covers" she typically performed. However "Poetry Man" was among the songs on the demo which Shelter Records scout Dino Airali late in 1972 advised Snow to record to submit to Shelter president Denny Cordell who on the strength of that demo signed Snow.

With Airali's encouragement Snow wrote more original material - seven of the nine songs on her debut album would be self-penned - and - after recording sessions with Snow in Los Angeles and Nashville failed to yield promising results - Airali, Snow would recall, would suggest: "Why don't we do a jazz-flavored [album?] We've tried...every other way." The final versions of Poetry Man" and the other tracks which comprised Snow's debut album were recorded at A & R Recording: Zoot Sims played the saxophone on "Poetry Man", which track was also distinguished by the percussion work of Ralph MacDonald.

Completed in December 1973, the Phoebe Snow album was released in June 1974 with "Poetry Man" given single release that December. "Poetry Man" became Snow's first charting hit, rising to #5 on the Billboard Hot 100 chart in April 1975 and #4 in the Canadian RPM Magazine charts. The previous month, the song reached #1 on the Billboard easy listening (adult contemporary) chart, where it remained for one week. The success of "Poetry Man" helped Snow achieve a Grammy nomination for Best New Artist in 1975.

== Subject matter/aftermath ==
Phoebe Snow would state in a 2008 interview that around the time of "Poetry Man"'s composition: "I was having a relationship with somebody. From the [lyrics]" - Home's that place you go each day to see your wife - "you can probably deduce that the guy was married. It was a bad thing to do. [And] it turn[ed] out he was not a particularly great guy"..."But I got a lovely romantic sonnet out of it." Rumors arose that Snow wrote "Poetry Man" about singer/songwriter Jackson Browne whom she toured with as opening act in the spring of 1975 although the two had never met previously and "Poetry Man" was already "in the can" by December 1973. Nevertheless on the American Top 40 radio broadcast of September 13, 1980, host Casey Kasem would allege that Snow herself had advised his show that Browne was her Poetry Man. However a 1989 interview posited Snow as "laugh[ing] hysterically at the notion" of a Jackson Browne hook-up being her song's inspiration, Snow being quoted as saying: "People [have] thought it was about Jackson because I [opened his] shows...I can't tell you who 'Poetry Man' was about, [except that] it was nobody famous."

Snow would in later years recall that although her completed debut album would indeed be "dubbed a jazz album" with its hit single "Poetry Man" overtly "light, ethereal and jazzy", (Phoebe Snow quotes:)"I never intended to be a [career] jazz artist:""Back when I was really starting to play guitar and sing, I listened to the Rolling Stones mostly, and Led Zeppelin and Cream. Sly and the Family Stone were my idols,""I was never happy performing [jazz music]. I always felt...overly concerned about being [technically] perfect:""[Recording my] second, third [and] fourth album,...I really felt like [an ersatz] Ella Fitzegrald...or Sarah Vaughn[,] imitating...those [jazz divas] instead of being who I really am":"And now at last I’ve come to terms with...my [true] musical persona...And I’m a rock & roll singer, and I've always been one.” The last quote was made while Snow was promoting her fifth album: the 1978 release Against the Grain, Snow's purported "entrance into outright rock & roll": however neither that album nor Snow's follow-up: another rock & roll foray entitled Rock Away, would ultimately be satisfying to Snow, who sat out nearly the entire '80s decade as a recording artist, her seventh album: Something Real, not being released until 1989, when it drew critical praise for Snow's "weaving her way through a fusion of jazz, folk and rock" to create "a sound that is distinctly her own." WAPO music critic Joe Brown would describe the title cut of Something Real as "'Poetry Man' revisited...[The earlier] song's ingenuously adulterous protagonist has wised up in a decade. This time around, she wants" - quoting the lyrics of "Something Real" - something real - something I don't have to steal.

While doing promotion for her sixth album release Rock Away in 1981, Snow would state that going forward her live gigs would largely eschew songs from her previous five albums: (Phoebe Snow quote:)"Mostly I don't relate to those older songs any more [although] I can't brush off [signature song] 'Poetry Man' of course." In a 1989 interview Snow would state: "I could [perform 'Poetry Man'] under anesthesia", while in 1998 she would express misgivings about the song's subject matter:

My head was in a particular place when I wrote that [song which] condon[es] extramarital relations, which now I do not at all condone. I was a silly kid back then who had no idea what was going on and I had sex with a married man. How can I stand up there...now and sing what purports to be this little romantic ditty about sleeping with somebody else's husband? That makes me crazy. I'm glad I'm saying this publicly because I don't like to preach during my shows. I just like to entertain...Now I sound like an old fart. But I just think extramarital affairs bring sorrow & bad karma...It's just really a bad idea.

Whatever misgivings or ennui Snow might have come to experience in performing "Poetry Man", the song would continue to be cited as a highlight of her concerts: Kathy Haight of The Charlotte Observer reviewing Snow's 1986 Spirit Square gig would opine that "the soaring [rendition] of 'Poetry Man'...sounded every bit as fresh and full of feeling as...when [Snow] first recorded it." Similarly, Jon Matsumoto of the Los Angeles Times, reviewing Snow's 1998 Orange County club gig, would opine that "Snow sounded like a heavenly dream while interpreting [her] gorgeous [and] best known song," while WaPo critic Pamela Murray Winters after seeing Snow's 2003 Birchmere gig, praised Snow's "nuanced" performance of "Poetry Man" which "hovered between pop-song coziness and erotic danger as she sang as a teenager in thrall to an older, married man.

== Charts ==
=== Weekly charts ===
Chart (1974–1975)	Peak position
Australia (Kent Music Report)	60
Canada RPM Top Singles	4
Canada RPM Adult Contemporary	1
New Zealand (RIANZ)	28
US Billboard Hot 100	5
US Billboard Adult Contemporary	1
US Cash Box Top 100	5

=== Year-end charts ===
Chart (1975)	Rank
Canada	58
US Billboard Hot 100	57
US Cash Box	66

== Cover versions ==
In 1997, Zap Mama, an African-Belgium based group, delivered a rendering on their album, Seven, which included a dialog of sorts with Spearhead's Michael Franti playing the Poetry Man himself.

In 1999, "Poetry Man" returned to the Adult Contemporary chart in a cover by Hawaiian female vocal trio Na Leo Pilimehana, which peaked at #24.

In 2007, Queen Latifah recorded a cover version of "Poetry Man" that was included on her Grammy-nominated album Trav'lin' Light.

In 2008, saxophonist Jessy J recorded an instrumental of "Poetry Man" on her album Tequila Moon.

in 2014, Canadian vocalist Jaclyn Guillou recorded "Poetry Man" on her contemporary jazz album, "Winter for Beginners".

== See also ==
- List of number-one adult contemporary singles of 1975 (U.S.)
