= Rock Away =

Studio album by Phoebe Snow
- Released: March 1981
- Recorded: 1980
- Studio: Power Station (New York City, New York) Record One (Los Angeles, California)
- Genre: Rock
- Length: 34:24
- Label: Mirage Records
- Producer: Greg Ladanyi; Richie Cannata

Phoebe Snow chronology
Against the Grain (1978)	Rock Away (1981)	Something Real (1989)

Singles from Rock Away
- 1. "Games" / "Down in the Basement" Released: February 1981; 2. "Mercy, Mercy, Mercy"/ "Something Good" Released: May 1981; 3. "Gasoline Alley"/"I Believe in You" Released: 12 June 1981 (UK only); 4. "Baby Please"/ "Rock Away" Released: July 1981

Rock Away is the sixth studio album by American singer-songwriter Phoebe Snow, recorded in 1980 and released in 1981.

== Background/recording ==
Following her massively successful 1974 self-title debut album, Phoebe Snow had seen her fortunes dwindle over four subsequent albums over four subsequent years. In 1979, rather than recording the fifth and final album due to Columbia Records, Snow had asked the label for release. Snow negotiated with Polydor Records in the spring of 1980, but would sign a two-album deal with newly formed Mirage Records in October 1980, having reportedly commenced recording sessions for her sixth studio album over the summer.

Snow's aspiration for her album Rock Away was what had been the failed aspiration for Snow's 1978 Against the Grain album - and would remain Snow's purported lifelong aspiration - : to trump her "wintry pop-folk-jazz chanteuse" musical persona with that of a "red-hot blues-and-rock-belting mama". Produced by Greg Ladanyi - who had notably helmed albums by Jackson Browne and Warren Zevon- Rock Away featured Snow covering R&B-style songs - including her personal choice of the Don Covay number "Mercy, Mercy, Mercy" - and vintage Rod Stewart ("Gasoline Alley") as well as introducing three Snow originals (Snow judging that two of the five songs she wrote for the album were subpar). The Snow originals include the title cut which - despite being entitled "Rock Away" - is a "sparse acoustic song [with] a genuine pastoral feel...the only [track] featuring Snow on guitar...significantly, it's the [album's] only understated song".

The majority of recording sessions for Rock Away took place at Manhattan's Power Plant and featured members of Billy Joel's band: Joel's wife Elizabeth Joel was then managing Snow, although that association had ended by the release of Rock Away. "Games", the track released as an advance single in February 1981 was recorded at Record One (LA), featuring such stalwart LA session players as keyboardist Bill Payne, drummer Russ Kunkel, and electric guitarists Danny Kortchmar and Waddy Wachtel.

== Critical reception ==
Rock Away was released in March 1981 to mixed reviews: Jack Lloyd of the Philadelphia Inquirer opined "Miss Snow departs sharply from her long-standing pattern with this one...And the results are generally pleasing. There is a hard edge that borders on rock in much of the music. Among the high spots are 'Cheap Thrills', 'Baby Please', 'Games' and 'Down in the Basement'. The harder-hitting songs are balanced by ballads that come close to Vintage Snow: 'Something Good' and 'I Believe in You' [the latter an inspirational Bob Dylan number]. The one most ill-advised number is 'Gasoline Alley', [which] simply does not suit Snow's voice." Don Reynolds of Dayton Daily News assessed Rock Away as having "its weak moments, but ...still a delight. [Her] unique, husky voice...in fine form[, Snow] shows excellent taste in choosing cover material...But the real gems here are a trio of Snow originals, two gorgeous ballads...and the darkly humorous rocker: 'Down in the Basement'."

Critiquing Rock Away for Newhouse News service, George Kanzler would write: "[Snow's] talent [has] found its best expression in ballads and soft rockers, songs with space for Snow to stretch out her amazingly supple and expressive voice [which] has the ability...to get to the heart of a song and to pull those heart strings in herself and in the listener":"Snow is not a very good rock singer, and her continued attempts at the genre are a profligate waste of prodigious natural and developed talent." Similarly Steve Libowitz of the Bridgewater Courier-News opined: "[Snow's] initial foray into" "a more rocking style" - the 1978 album Against the Grain - "[did] not [do] well artistically or commercially. 'Rock Away' is her boldest step yet in this direction, and it's just as misguided...As a balladeer, Snow is almost without peer, but she should leave rock-&-roll to those who can handle it. [Her] compelling timbre has been replaced by a grating wail. There's no reason to tackle this sort of material when you have the equipment for much more sophisticated styles."

Rock Away also disappointed Washington Post critic Geoffrey Himes, despite Himes sharing Snow's own belief in her rock music acumen: (Geoffrey Himes 1998 quote:)"[Though] Snow [is perceived] as a sensitive singer-songwriter""because she had a hit with...the [Joni] Mitchellesque "Poetry Man"...her real talent [has proven to be] for Bonnie Raitt-like vocal interpretations of rock and soul songs." Himes' evaluation was that on Rock Away the "powerful, persistent emotional impulses [of Snow's voice] are roped in and weighed down by the easy-listening sentiments of [her] producers [who] saddle Snow with the kind of pop-rock that plods along without disruption or challenge. Fortunately, Snow is able to escape their restraints to create some special moments on the album."

Snow's own eventual verdict on Rock Away would be: "The rock-&-roll thing worked and it didn't work - something was still missing."

== Impact/ aftermath ==
"Games", the February 1981 advance single release from Rock Away, would become Snow's most successful Billboard Hot 100 entry since "Poetry Man" - except for her Top 30 duet with Paul Simon: "Gone at Last" - while remaining a Top 40 shortfall, peaking at #46. "Games" was significantly less successful on the singles charts of the music industry journals Cash Box and Record World, with respective peaks of #80 ' and #86 Despite the under-performance of its advance single and the lack of strong reviews, the album Rock Away - released in March 1981 - by its fifth week on the Billboard 200 album chart had become Snow's highest-charting album since her Top 30 1976 album release: It Looks Like Snow, although Rock Away would in its eighth charting week peak no higher than #51. (The album charts in Cash Box and Record World would afford Rock Away respective peaks of #86 and #91.)

Rock Away would fail to derive significant fresh impetus from its second single release: "Mercy, Mercy, Mercy", released in May 1981 to stall at #52 on the Billboard Hot 100: as with "Games", "Mercy, Mercy, Mercy" was less successful on the singles charts in Cash Box and Record World with respective peaks of #75 and #78. Also Snow had to abruptly drop promoting Rock Away in June 1981 after suffering a vocal injury, a concert date in Denver incurring a burst capillary due to the altitude, with Snow's recuperation necessitating the cancelation of 28 scheduled concert gigs along with another promo. Snow would claim this debacle soured her relationship with Mirage Records who declared the tracks recorded for the second album Snow owed the label to lack commercial potential(Phoebe Snow quote:)"I went back on my hands and knees [to Mirage], but they told me to shop it elsewhere."(Phoebe Snow quote:) "So I walked away from my second deal" - Mirage was actually Snow's third label affiliation - "It was not the most comfortable way of doing it, but it...gave me a sabbatical", Snow being without a label affiliation until 1988 when she signed with Elektra Records, for whom her seventh studio album: Something Real, would not be released until 1989.

== Track listing ==
Side one

1. "Cheap Thrills" (Bob McDill) – 3:35
2. "Baby Please" (Carolyne Mas) – 4:22
3. "Gasoline Alley" (Ronnie Wood, Rod Stewart) – 3:07
4. "Rock Away"(Phoebe Snow) – 2:50
5. "Mercy, Mercy, Mercy" (Don Covay, Ronald Alonzo Miller) – 2:29

Side two

1. "Games" (Vince Melamed, Andrea Farber) – 3:46
2. "Down in the Basement" (Phoebe Snow) – 2:21
3. "Shoo-Rah Shoo-Rah" (Allen Toussaint) – 2:36
4. "Something Good" (Phoebe Snow) – 4:07
5. "I Believe in You" (Bob Dylan) – 4:58

== Personnel ==
- Phoebe Snow – lead vocals, backing vocals (1, 3, 7), acoustic guitar (4)

Session players/ singers

- Craig Doerge – acoustic piano (1, 2), electric piano (6)
- Robbie Kondor – acoustic piano (3, 9)
- Ralph Schuckett – keyboards (5), acoustic piano (5), organ (5, 7, 8)
- Bill Payne – synthesizers (6), acoustic piano (10), organ (10)
- Allen St. John – acoustic piano (7)
- David Brown – electric guitar (1–3, 5, 8–10), acoustic guitar solo (4), acoustic guitar (9, 10)
- David Landau – electric guitar (1, 2, 5, 8, 10), electric guitar solo (3, 9), acoustic guitar (10)
- Danny Kortchmar – electric guitar (6)
- Waddy Wachtel – electric guitar solo (6)
- Doug Stegmeyer – bass guitar (1–5, 7–10)
- Bob Glaub – bass guitar (6)
- Liberty DeVitto – drums (1–5, 7–10)
- Russ Kunkel – drums (6)
- Bob Chounard – drums (7)
- Randy Brecker – trumpet (8)
- Richie Cannata – backing vocals (1), tenor sax solo (2), percussion (5, 8), baritone saxophone (8), tenor saxophone (8), soprano saxophone (9), soprano sax solo (10)

Session players/ singers (cont.)

- Mark Clarke – backing vocals (1), bass (7)
- Lennie Delduca – backing vocals (2)
- Ula Hedwig – backing vocals (2, 9)
- David Lasley – backing vocals (3, 6, 9)
- Henry Reel – lead vocals (5)
- Arnold McCuller – backing vocals (6)
- Jocelyn Brown – backing vocals (8)
- Krystal Davis – backing vocals (8)
- Patti Austin – backing vocals (10)

Production

- Richie Cannata – producer
- Greg Ladanyi – producer, recording, mixing
- Jeff Hendrickson – assistant engineer
- Jamie Ledner – assistant engineer
- Mike Reese – mastering
- Doug Sax – mastering
- The Mastering Lab (Hollywood, California) – mastering location
- Bob Defrin – art direction
- Jim Houghton – photography test
