= Soul Train: The Dance Years =

1999–2000 series of compilation albums

Soul Train: The Dance Years is a series of compilation albums released by Rhino Records in 1999 and 2000, and spun off from the long-running syndicated television series Soul Train.

Each album features 14 hit rhythm and blues recordings, said to have been featured on Soul Train, from a specific year of the 1970s. Ten albums were released, each one representing one year of the decade.

The songs on each album represent stylistic trends in R&B music of the times, including soul, Motown, funk, disco and straight-ahead pop. Iconic artists whose music is included in the series included Aretha Franklin, The Jackson 5, The Miracles, The Temptations, James Brown, Gladys Knight and the Pips, Marvin Gaye, Barry White and many others. Each album contains liner notes, discussing musical trends, artists and songs featured on the album.

A vast majority of the 140 tracks in the series reached the top 10 of the Billboard Hot Soul Singles (prior to 1973, Best Selling Soul Singles) chart. In addition, many of the songs also reached the top 10 of the Billboard Hot 100, with 37 reaching No. 1.

== Album series ==
=== 1970 ===
Soul Train: The Dance Years: 1970

Compilation album by Various artists
- Released: May 23, 2000
- Genre: R&B, pop rock
- Label: Rhino

1970
Review scores
Source	Rating
Allmusic	3/5 stars

1. "ABC" - The Jackson 5 2:58
2. "Turn Back the Hands of Time" - Tyrone Davis 2:39
3. "Give Me Just a Little More Time" - Chairmen Of The Board 2:40
4. "Band of Gold" - Freida Payne 2:55
5. "A Rainy Night in Georgia" - Brook Benton 3:52
6. "Ball of Confusion (That's What the World Is Today)" - The Temptations 4:04
7. "Spill the Wine" - Eric Burdon and War 4:53
8. "Super Bad (Pts. 1-2)" - James Brown 5:03
9. "War" - Edwin Starr 3:28
10. "Somebody's Been Sleeping" - One Hundred Proof (Aged in Soul) 2:47
11. "Love on a Two-Way Street" - Moments 3:35
12. "Tears of a Clown" - Smokey Robinson and the Miracles 3:05
13. "O-o-h Child" - Five Stairsteps 3:15
14. "Westbound #9" - Flaming Ember 3:34

=== 1971 ===
Soul Train: The Dance Years: 1971

Compilation album by Various artists
- Released: May 23, 2000
- Genre: R&B, pop rock
- Label: Rhino

1971
Review scores
Source	Rating
Allmusic	3/5 stars

1. "Mr. Big Stuff" - Jean Knight 2:30
2. "Treat Her Like a Lady" - Cornelius Brothers & Sister Rose 2:45
3. "Never Can Say Goodbye" - The Jackson 5 3:00
4. "Ain't No Sunshine" - Bill Withers 2:05
5. "Just My Imagination (Running Away With Me)" - The Temptations 3:53
6. "She's Not Just Another Woman" - Eighth Day 3:04
7. "Want Ads" - Honey Cone 2:47
8. "Thin Line Between Love and Hate" - The Persuaders 3:23
9. "What's Going On" - Marvin Gaye 3:56
10. "Respect Yourself" - Staple Singers 3:32
11. "Groove Me King" - King Floyd 3:00
12. "Whatcha See Is Whatcha Get" - The Dramatics 3:33
13. "Bridge over Troubled Water" - Aretha Franklin 3:20
14. "Have You Seen Her?" - Chi-Lites 5:08

=== 1972 ===
Soul Train: The Dance Years: 1972

Compilation album by Various artists
- Released: July 18, 2000
- Genre: R&B, pop rock
- Label: Rhino

1972
Review scores
Source	Rating
Allmusic	4/5 stars

1. "Everybody Plays the Fool" - Main Ingredient 3:20
2. "I'll Be Around" - Spinners 3:12
3. "Betcha by Golly, Wow" - Stylistics 3:18
4. "I'll Take You There" - Staple Singers 3:17
5. "Too Late to Turn Back Now" - Cornelius Brothers & Sister Rose 3:23
6. "I Gotcha" - Joe Tex 2:30
7. "In the Rain" - Dramatics 4:32
8. "Freddie's Dead (Theme from 'Superfly')" - Mayfield 3:18
9. "Oh Girl" - Chi-Lites 3:50
10. "Clean up Woman" - Betty Wright 2:48
11. "(If Loving You Is Wrong) I Don't Want to Be Right" - Luther Ingram 3:28
12. "Me and Mrs. Jones" - Billy Paul 4:48
13. "One Monkey Don't Stop No Show (Pt. 1)" - Honey Cone 3:45
14. "Ben" - Michael Jackson 2:44

=== 1973 ===
Soul Train: The Dance Years: 1973

Compilation album by Various artists
- Released: July 18, 2000
- Genre: R&B, pop rock
- Label: Rhino

1973
Review scores
Source	Rating
Allmusic	3/5 stars

1. "Let's Get It On" - Marvin Gaye 4:02
2. "Pillow Talk" - Sylvia 4:23
3. "Keep on Truckin' (Pt. 1)" - Eddie Kendricks 3:34
4. "Could It Be I'm Falling in Love" - Spinners 4:14
5. "Break Up to Make Up" - Stylistics 3:57
6. "The Cisco Kid" - War 4:30
7. "Superfly" - Curtis Mayfield 3:09
8. "Natural High" - Bloodstone 4:11
9. "If You're Ready (Come Go With Me)" - Staple Singers 3:24
10. "Why Can't We Live Together" - Timmy Thomas 3:55
11. "I'm Gonna Love You Just a Little More, Baby" - Barry White 4:09
12. "Right Place, Wrong Time" - Doctor John 2:53
13. "Until You Come Back to Me (That's What I'm Gonna Do)" - Aretha Franklin 3:25
14. "Midnight Train to Georgia" - Gladys Knight & the Pips 3:55

=== 1974 ===
Soul Train: The Dance Years: 1974

Compilation album by Various artists
- Released: September 19, 2000
- Genre: R&B, pop rock
- Label: Rhino

1974
Review scores
Source	Rating
Allmusic	3/5 stars

1. "TSOP (The Sound of Philadelphia)" - MFSB featuring The Three Degrees 3:36
2. "Rock Your Baby" - George McCrae 3:20
3. "Then Came You" - Dionne Warwick and the Spinners 3:59
4. "Love's Theme" - Love Unlimited Orchestra 3:35
5. "Dancing Machine" - The Jackson 5 2:42
6. "You Make Me Feel Brand New" - Stylistics 4:47
7. "Tell Me Something Good" - Rufus featuring Chaka Khan 3:33
8. "Hollywood Swinging" - Kool & the Gang 4:40
9. "Sideshow" - Blue Magic 4:12
10. "Just Don't Want to Be Lonely" - Main Ingredient 3:39
11. "The Payback (Pt. 1)" - James Brown 3:33
12. "Do It ('Til You're Satisfied)" - B.T. Express 3:14
13. "Boogie Down" - Eddie Kendricks 3:51
14. "Show and Tell" - Al Wilson 3:29

=== 1975 ===
Soul Train: The Dance Years: 1975

Compilation album by Various artists
- Released: September 19, 2000
- Genre: R&B, pop rock
- Label: Rhino

1975
Review scores
Source	Rating
Allmusic	3/5 stars

1. "Fire" - Ohio Players 3:17
2. "Pick Up the Pieces" - Average White Band 3:03
3. "Walking in Rhythm" - Blackbyrds 2:55
4. "That's the Way (I Like It)" - KC & the Sunshine Band 3:06
5. "They Just Can't Stop It (Games People Play)" - Spinners 3:30
6. "Express" - B.T. Express 3:33
7. "Lovin' You" - Minnie Riperton 3:25
8. "Rockin' Chair" - Gwen McCrae 3:19
9. "The Hustle" - Van McCoy and the Soul City Symphony 3:47
10. "It Only Takes a Minute" - Tavares 3:15
11. "Love Won't Let Me Wait" - Major Harris 3:47
12. "Slippery When Wet" - The Commodores 3:21
13. "Why Can't We Be Friends?" - War 3:50
14. "Let's Do It Again" - Staple Singers 3:28

=== 1976 ===
Soul Train: The Dance Years: 1976

Compilation album by Various artists
- Released: November 2, 1999
- Genre: R&B, pop rock
- Label: Rhino

1976
Review scores
Source	Rating
Allmusic	3/5 stars

1. "Love Rollercoaster" - Ohio Players 2:53
2. "Dazz" - Brick 5:38
3. "Car Wash" - Rose Royce 3:32
4. "You'll Never Find Another Love Like Mine" - Lou Rawls 3:32
5. "Get Up and Boogie (That's Right)" - Silver Convention 2:45
6. "(Shake, Shake, Shake) Shake Your Booty" - KC & the Sunshine Band 3:06
7. "Young Hearts Run Free" - Candi Staton 4:07
8. "Play That Funky Music" - Wild Cherry 3:15
9. "Boogie Fever" - Sylvers 3:28
10. "Message in Our Music" - O'Jays 3:21
11. "The Rubberband Man" - Spinners 3:34
12. "Something He Can Feel" - Aretha Franklin 3:27
13. "She's Gone" - Hall & Oates 5:15
14. "Love Machine (Pt. 1)" - The Miracles 3:00

=== 1977 ===
Soul Train: The Dance Years: 1977

Compilation album by Various artists
- Released: November 2, 1999
- Genre: R&B, pop rock
- Label: Rhino

1977
Review scores
Source	Rating
Allmusic	3/5 stars

1. "Best of My Love" - Emotions 3:41
2. "Brick House" - Commodores 3:33
3. "Serpentine Fire" - Earth, Wind & Fire 3:45
4. "Got to Give It Up (Pt. 1)" - Gaye 4:11
5. "It's Ecstasy When You Lay Down Next to Me" - Barry White 3:26
6. "Strawberry Letter 23" - Brothers Johnson 3:36
7. "Float On" - Floaters 4:13
8. "Don't Leave Me This Way" - Thelma Houston 3:40
9. "I'm Your Boogie Man" - KC & the Sunshine Band 4:02
10. "Slide" - Slave 3:20
11. "Boogie Nights" - Heatwave 3:40
12. "(Every Time I Turn Around) Back in Love Again" - LTD 3:40
13. "Do Ya Wanna Get Funky with Me" - Peter Brown 3:43
14. "High School Dance" - Sylvers 3:49

=== 1978 ===
Soul Train: The Dance Years: 1978

Compilation album by Various artists
- Released: October 5, 1999
- Genre: R&B, pop rock
- Label: Rhino

1978
Review scores
Source	Rating
Allmusic	3/5 stars

1. "The Groove Line" - Heatwave 4:16
2. "Flash Light" - Parliament 4:32
3. "You and I" - Rick James 3:12
4. "Le Freak" - Chic 4:20
5. "I Love the Nightlife (Disco 'Round)" - Alicia Bridges 3:00
6. "I'm Every Woman" - Chaka Khan 3:52
7. "Use Ta Be My Girl" - O'Jays 3:23
8. "Disco Inferno" - Trammps 3:36
9. "Get Off" - Foxy 3:34
10. "It's You That I Need" - Enchantment 3:56
11. "Boogie Oogie Oogie" - A Taste of Honey 3:39
12. "Ffun" - Con Funk Shun 3:36
13. "Shame" - Evelyn Champagne King 2:58
14. "Dance With Me" - Peter Brown 3:48

=== 1979 ===
Soul Train: The Dance Years: 1979

Compilation album by Various artists
- Released: October 5, 1999
- Genre: R&B, pop rock
- Label: Rhino

1979
Review scores
Source	Rating
Allmusic	3/5 stars

1. "Shake Your Groove Thing" - Peaches & Herb 3:26
2. "Disco Nights (Rock-Freak)" - GQ 3:57
3. "I Will Survive" - Gloria Gaynor 3:18
4. "Working My Way Back to You/Forgive Me, Girl" - Spinners 4:03
5. "Ring My Bell" - Anita Ward 3:37
6. "Ladies Night" - Kool & the Gang 3:31
7. "Every 1's a Winner" - Hot Chocolate 3:42
8. "Got to Be Real" - Cheryl Lynn 3:44
9. "Livin' It Up (Friday Night)" - Bell & James 3:22
10. "You Can't Change That" - Ray Parker Jr. & Raydio 3:23
11. "What You Won't Do for Love" - Bobby Caldwell 3:31
12. "Good Times" - Chic 3:44
13. "Ain't No Stoppin' Us Now" - McFadden & Whitehead 3:42
14. "We Are Family" - Sister Sledge 3:37
