= Phoebe Snow (disambiguation) =

Phoebe Snow (1950–2011) was an American singer.

Phoebe Snow may also refer to:

- Phoebe Snow (album), a 1974 album by Phoebe Snow, the American singer
- Phoebe Snow (character), a fictional character created by the Delaware, Lackawanna and Western Railroad in 1902 as a marketing symbol for the railroad
- Phoebe Snow (train), a named passenger train that ran 1949–1966
