= Second Childhood =

Studio album by Phoebe Snow
- Released: January 1976
- Recorded: A&R Recording, New York City
- Genre: Soft rock; jazz
- Length: 40:24
- Label: Columbia
- Producer: Phil Ramone

Phoebe Snow chronology
Phoebe Snow (1974)	Second Childhood (1976)	It Looks Like Snow (1976)

Second Childhood is the second album by the singer and songwriter Phoebe Snow, released in 1976. Second Childhood was certified gold by the RIAA on July 9, 1976.

== Reception ==
Professional ratings
Review scores
Source	Rating
AllMusic	3/5 stars
Christgau's Record Guide	B
The Rolling Stone Album Guide	3.5/5 stars

In a retrospective review for AllMusic, critic William Ruhlmann called the album "a classy job on which Snow contributed seven originals and displayed her versatility on covers ranging from Motown to Gershwin." Robert Christgau wrote of the album: "I'm pleased to report that her trademark melismatic quaver hasn't degenerated into a gimmick, and I acknowledge that this is a good record of its type. I just have my doubts about how good a jazz-folk mood-music record can be."

== Track listing ==
All songs by Phoebe Snow, except where noted

1. "Two Fisted Love" - 4:03
2. "Cash In" - 5:44
3. "Inspired Insanity" - 3:56
4. "No Regrets" (Harry Tobias, Roy Ingraham) - 2:58
5. "Sweet Disposition" - 4:04
6. "All Over" - 3:29
7. "Isn't It a Shame" - 3:56
8. "Going Down for the Third Time" (Holland–Dozier–Holland) - 2:33
9. "Pre-Dawn Imagination" - 3:28
10. "There's a Boat Dat's Leavin' Soon for New York" (George Gershwin, Ira Gershwin, DuBose Heyward) - 5:27

== Personnel ==
- Phoebe Snow – lead vocals, backing vocals (1, 2, 5, 6, 8), acoustic guitar (1–3, 7)
- Ken Ascher – electric piano (1)
- Ken Bichel – synthesizers (1)
- Richard Tee – electric piano (2, 5), acoustic piano (8), organ (8)
- Don Grolnick – electric piano (4, 6, 10), acoustic piano (9)
- Hugh McCracken – acoustic guitar (1), electric guitar (2, 5, 8)
- John Tropea – electric guitar (1, 8)
- Stuart Scharf – acoustic guitar (7)
- Tony Levin – bass guitar (1, 2, 8)
- Will Lee – bass guitar (4, 6, 9, 10)
- Gordon Edwards – bass guitar (5)
- Ron Carter – double bass (3)
- Richard Davis – double bass (7)
- Steve Gadd – drums (1, 2)
- Jimmy Young – drums (4, 6)
- Grady Tate – drums (5, 8, 10)
- Ralph MacDonald – percussion (2, 3, 6, 7)
- David Sanborn – saxophone solo (1, 5)
- Jerome Richardson – flute solo (10)
- Patrick Williams – orchestration (2, 3, 6, 9, 10)
- Howard Johnson – tuba quintet arrangement (5)
- Phil Kearns – backing vocals (1, 5, 6, 8)
- The Jessy Dixon Singers – backing vocals (2)
- Phil Ramone – backing vocals (5)

== Production ==
- Producer – Phil Ramone
- Engineers – Glenn Berger and Phil Ramone
- Assistant Engineers – Vicky Fabry and David Smith
- Design – Ed Lee
- Photography – Frank Laffitte
- Handwriting – Robert Biro and Andy Engel

== Charts ==
Chart (1976)	Peak position
Australia (Kent Music Report)	71
United States (Pop Albums)	13

== Certifications ==
Region	Certification	Certified units/sales
United States (RIAA)	Gold	500,000^{^}
^{^} Shipments figures based on certification alone.
