= Never Letting Go =

Studio album by Phoebe Snow
- Released: 1977
- Studio: A&R Recording, New York City
- Genre: Pop jazz
- Label: Columbia
- Producer: Phil Ramone

Phoebe Snow chronology
It Looks Like Snow (1976)	Never Letting Go (1977)	Against the Grain (1978)

Never Letting Go is the fourth album by singer–songwriter Phoebe Snow, released in 1977.

== Reception ==
Professional ratings
Review scores
Source	Rating
AllMusic	3/5 stars
Christgau's Record Guide	B
The Rolling Stone Album Guide	3/5 stars

Robert Christgau wrote of the album: "By now Snow projects a jazz singer's assurance, and the originals are still overshadowed by the covers ... the tempos are invariably too reflective, and the reprises invariably too much." In a retrospective review for AllMusic, critic William Ruhlmann wrote that "the record marked a fall-off in both her commercial success and her artistic accomplishment. The tasty studio musicians and Phil Ramone's pop-jazz production were still in place, and Snow remained a remarkable singer, but her synthesis of styles was beginning to seem not so much inspired as muddled."

== Track listing ==
All songs written by Phoebe Snow, except where noted.

1. "Love Makes a Woman" (Carl Davis, Eugene Record, William Sanders, Gerald Simms) – 3:21
2. "Majesty of Life" – 3:36
3. "Ride the Elevator" – 3:55
4. "Something So Right" (Paul Simon) – 4:02
5. "Never Letting Go" (Stephen Bishop) – 3:12
6. "We're Children" – 3:01
7. "The Middle of the Night" – 3:33
8. "Electra" – 3:53
9. "Garden of Joy Blues" (Clifford Hayes) – 4:31

== Personnel ==
Musicians and vocalists

- Phoebe Snow – vocals, acoustic guitar (2, 6)
- Ken Ascher – acoustic piano (1, 7, 8), electric piano (1, 5, 7), organ (1), keyboards (3, 9), synthesizers (7)
- Richard Tee – electric piano (2, 4)
- Bob James – acoustic piano (5), electric piano (6)
- Hugh McCracken – electric guitar (1, 4, 5, 7), acoustic guitar (2, 5, 6), electric slide guitar (3), harmonica (3)
- Steve Burgh – electric guitar, acoustic 12-string guitar (5), acoustic guitar (6)
- Steve Khan – electric guitar (1, 3, 8), "plunger" electric guitar (7), electric 12-string guitar (8), electric guitar solo (8), acoustic guitar (9)
- Will Lee – bass guitar (1, 5–7)
- Tony Levin – bass guitar (2–4, 8, 9)
- Chris Parker – drums (1, 4–7)
- Grady Tate – drums (2, 7)
- Steve Gadd – drums (3, 8, 9)
- Ralph MacDonald – percussion (1, 2, 4, 6)
- Michael Brecker – tenor sax solo (1, 6)
- Hubert Laws – flute solo (2)
- Eddie Daniels – clarinet solo (3)
- Phil Woods – alto sax solo (5)
- David Nadien – concertmaster
- Gwen Guthrie – backing vocals (1, 4, 5)
- Lani Groves – backing vocals (1, 4, 5)
- Patti Austin – backing vocals (1, 4, 5)
- Kenny Loggins – vocals (6)

Orchestra

- William Eaton – orchestration (1, 2, 8), woodwind orchestration (4)
- Robert Freedman – orchestration (3, 5), string orchestration (4)
- Ken Ascher – orchestration (7)

Strings

- David Nadien – concertmaster
- Janet Hamilton and Charles McCracken – cello
- Russ Savakos – double bass
- Lamar Alsop and Emanuel Vardi – viola
- Sanford Allen, Joyce Flissler, Harry Glickman, Marvin Morgenstern, David Nadien, Tony Posk, Herbert Sorkin and Carol Webb – violin

Brass

- Dave Taylor – bass trombone
- Barry Rogers – trombone
- Randy Brecker, Victor Paz and Alan Rubin – trumpet and flugelhorn
- Jonathan Dorn – tuba

Woodwinds

- Ronnie Cuber – baritone saxophone
- Ray Beckinstein, Leon Cohen, Dave Tofani and George Young – alto flute and clarinet
- Phil Bodner, Harvey Estrin, Walter Kane and George Marge – bass flute
- Eddie Daniels – Bb clarinet
- Michael Brecker and Eddie Daniels – tenor saxophone

== Production ==
- Phil Ramone – producer, remixing
- Jim Boyer – engineer
- Kathy Kurs – production associate
- Gene Grief – album design
- Paula Scher – album design
- Fred Burrell – sleeve photography
- New York Public Library – cover photography
