= I Can't Complain =

Studio album by Phoebe Snow
- Released: 10 February 1998
- Recorded: 1997
- Studio: The Hit Factory (New York City, New York); Quad Studios (Nashville, Tennessee); Andora Studios (Hollywood, California)
- Genre: Blues, soft rock
- Length: 48:39
- Label: House of Blues
- Producer: Jimmy Vivino; Joel Moss

Phoebe Snow chronology
Something Real (1989)	I Can't Complain (1998)	Natural Wonder (2003)

I Can't Complain is the ninth studio album by American singer/songwriter Phoebe Snow, released in 1998.

== Background and recording ==
After having seven album releases between 1974 and 1981, Snow had not had an album released until 1989 when Elektra Records issued the album Something Real. Although Something Real had proven somewhat of a commercial disappointment Snow had commenced recording a follow-up album in 1991: after recording six tracks to which she said she felt no connection. Snow commented "I was like the gal singer who phoned her part in" - Snow asked for release from her Elektra Records contract.

In 1991-1992 Snow participated in the final tour of the New York Rock and Soul Revue, reuniting with guitarist Jimmy Vivino who had come to the fore as a member of Snow's 1984 touring band. According to Snow, Vivino began urging her to record a blues album, and by 1998, the singer then feeling the time was right, Snow - with Vivino and Joel Moss co-producing - began work on an album to be focused on traditional blues, Vivino presenting Snow with a preliminary list of 50 or 60 songs of that genre. However Snow found the single-genre focus dis-satisfying and the eventual track listing for I Can't Complain featured only two traditional blues songs: "Big Leg Blues" and "Lord, I Just Can't Keep From Cryin'", the album's core comprising R&B covers and Snow's own versions of songs by other singer-songwriters she admired.

Snow also recorded the Peter Pan showtune "Never Never Land", dedicated it to her disabled daughter Valerie Rose Kearns (1975–2007), in Snow's words: "a perennial child": (Phoebe Snow quote:)"That song totally embodies my daughter's vibe. It's exactly what I think she would say if she could talk. It's a beautiful sentiment about never growing old mentally or spiritually." I Can't Complain also featured a remake of an obscure Terry Reid cut: "Right to the End", a patent bid for A/C airplay featuring Michael McDonald as Snow's duet partner (McDonald, Snow's New York Rock and Soul Revue associate, was also featured on the Bob Dylan cover "It Takes a Lot to Laugh, It Takes a Train to Cry").

Featuring as session players Vivino and his regular collaborators Scott Healy and Mike Merritt, and also Al Kooper, I Can't Complain was recorded in four days and released in February 1998.

== Critical reception ==
I Can't Complain was released to generally positive reviews such as that of Geoffrey Himes of The Washington Post, a longtime time Phoebe Snow aficionado who considered I Can't Complain an effective showcase for Snow's "real talent...for [Bonnie] Raitt-like vocal interpretations of rock and soul songs...Snow shows taste as well as breadth in picking songs for the album...Snow's 45-year-old voice is in great shape, able to maintain its dark, smoky texture even as it rises and falls across octaves and volumes. Never has it been as restrained, though, as willing to imply instead of declare."

More moderately endorsed by Elysa Gardner of the Los Angeles Times - "None of [the album's tracks] are exactly revelatory, but Snow's tangy, warmly virtuosic voice and accessible blues-pop arrangements provide guilt-free easy listening," - I Can't Complain also had its share of emphatic naysayers, exemplified by Bob Wallace of The Morning Call: "Why did the sweet-voiced [Snow] make this banal mix of adult contemporary video-pop[?] While schmaltzy songs such as the self-absorbed 'Brand New Me' and the torchy 'Right to the End'... are ducky enough [and] a couple of [other] songs: Van Morrison's 'Madame George' and Blind Willie Johnson's 'Lord I Just Can't Keep From Cryin'," are easy on the ears"..."what's not...are the bluesplotation songs 'Baby Work Out', 'Rockin' Pneumonia & the Boogie Woogie Flu', and 'Big Leg Blues'. Uglier still are Snow's blasphemous versions of 'Piece of My Heart' and...'It Takes a Lot to Laugh, It Takes a Train to Cry'. Why [would] any singer...want to take on [the signature song of] Janis Joplin[?] And turning Dylan's classic into a decaffeinated duet with [Michael] McDonald...is sinful, if not illegal."

Despite the release of two promo singles- "Right to the End" preceded by "Brand New Me" - and an extensive club tour by Snow, "I Can't Complain" - to quote Snow - "got buried. As they say in show biz, no one was steering the ship" - an evident reference to internal issues at House of Blues the album's indie label of release. Snow would have one subsequent studio album released: Natural Wonder (2003).

== Track listing ==
1. "Brand New Me" (Theresa Bell, Jerry Butler, Kenny Gamble) – 4:22
2. "Right to the End" (featuring Michael McDonald) (Gerard McMahon) – 5:26
3. "Madame George" (Van Morrison) – 4:07
4. "Piece of My Heart" (Bert Berns, Jerry Ragavoy) – 4:49
5. "Baby, Work Out" (Alonzo Tucker, Jackie Wilson) – 3:27
6. "Rockin' Pneumonia and the Boogie Woogie Flu" (Huey "Piano" Smith) – 3:10
7. "A Case of You" (Joni Mitchell) – 4:05
8. "Big Leg Blues" (Mississippi John Hurt) – 3:43
9. "It Takes a Lot to Laugh, It Takes a Train to Cry" (featuring Michael McDonald) (Bob Dylan) – 3:58
10. "Share Your Love with Me" (Alfred Braggs, Deadric Malone) – 3:21
11. "Lord, I Just Can't Keep From Cryin'" (Blind Willie Johnson) – 4:16
12. "Never, Never Land" (Jule Styne, Comden and Green) – 3:46

== Personnel ==
- Phoebe Snow – vocals, backing vocals (4, 5), rhythm guitar (6), harmony vocals (7), guitars (8)
- Al Kooper – Hammond B3 organ (1, 4, 5, 9–11)
- Reese Wynans – Hammond B3 organ (2)
- Scott Healy – accordion (3, 7), acoustic piano (4, 5, 10, 11), Wurlitzer electric piano (6)
- Michael McDonald – vocals (2, 9), Wurlitzer electric piano (9)
- Jimmy Vivino – guitars (1, 3–5, 7–12), backing vocals (1, 4, 5), musical arrangements (1–11), rhythm guitar (2, 4, 6), guitar solo (2, 4, 6, 9–11)
- Steve Burgh – guitars (7, 12), mandolin (8), arrangements (12)
- Michael Merritt – bass (1, 3–8, 10–12)
- Glenn Worf – bass (2, 9)
- Lou Appel – drums (1, 3–6, 8, 10, 11)
- John Gardner – drums (9)
- Scott Frankfurt – percussion (2), loops (2)
- Cyro Baptista – percussion (6–8)
- Larry Packer – fiddle (12)
- Joel Moss – backing vocals (5)

Production

- Kathryn Keller Moss – A&R
- Joel Moss – producer, recording, mixing, mastering
- Jimmy Vivino – producer
- Kenny Farris – assistant engineer
- Mark Johnson – assistant engineer
- Tony Rambo – assistant engineer
- Artie Smith – technical assistant
- Ric Wilson – digital editing, mastering
- Digisonics (Northridge, California) – editing and mastering location
- Cheri Moise – production coordinator
- Jill Highland – project coordinator
- Valerie Behling – art direction, design
- Connie Treantafeles – art direction, design
- Deborah Feingold – photography
- Joseph Boggess – hair, make-up
