= It Looks Like Snow =

Studio album by Phoebe Snow
- Released: 1976
- Recorded: Cherokee Studios (Los Angeles, California); Wally Heider Studios (San Francisco, California)
- Genre: R&B; soft rock; jazz; pop
- Label: Columbia
- Producer: David Rubinson

Phoebe Snow chronology
Second Childhood (1976)	It Looks Like Snow (1976)	Never Letting Go (1977)

It Looks Like Snow is the third album by singer–songwriter Phoebe Snow, released in 1976.

== Reception ==
Professional ratings
Review scores
Source	Rating
Allmusic	4.5/5 stars
Christgau's Record Guide	B+

In a retrospective review for Allmusic, critic Joe Viglione called the album "an overpowering collection of pop-jazz-funk-folk that puts this amazing vocalist's talents in a beautiful light... It Looks Like Snow is a major work from a fabulous performer traversing styles and genres with ease and elegance." Robert Christgau wrote of the album; "Snow's gifts as a singer and lyricist are finally channeled. The silly mystical ideas are way down below her overriding good sense; up above we find a fairly strong, direct, and happy woman who is by no means vegetating in her contentment..."

== Track listing ==
All songs written by Phoebe Snow, except where noted.

1. "Autobiography (Shine, Shine, Shine)" – 5:15
2. "Teach Me Tonight" (Gene De Paul, Sammy Cahn) – 4:30
3. "Stand Up on the Rock" – 3:58
4. "In My Girlish Days" (Ernest Lawlars) – 4:48
5. "Mercy on Those" – 6:06
6. "Don't Let Me Down" (John Lennon, Paul McCartney) – 5:51
7. "Drink Up the Melody (Bite the Dust, Blues)" – 5:51
8. "Fat Chance" – 2:56
9. "My Faith Is Blind" – 5:54
10. "Shakey Ground" (Eddie Hazel, Jeffrey Bowen, Angelo Bond) – 4:18

== Personnel ==
- Phoebe Snow – lead vocals, backing vocals, guitars
- Reginald "Sonny" Burke – keyboards, string arrangements
- David Pomeranz – keyboards on "Mercy on Those"
- David Bromberg, Steve Burgh, Ray Parker Jr., Greg Poree – guitars
- Chuck Domanico, Reggie McBride – bass guitar
- James Gadson, Ed Greene, Harvey Mason – drums
- Andy Narell – steel drums
- Hadley Caliman – horns
- Mel Martin – horns
- Kurt McGettrick – horns, horn arrangements
- Bob Yance – horns
- The Golden Age Jazz Band on "Autobiography (Shine, Shine, Shine)"
- Phil Kearns – backing vocals
- The Waters Family – backing vocals

=== Production ===
- Producer – David Rubinson
- Engineers – David Rubinson and Fred Catero
- Mastered by Phil Brown and George Horn at Columbia Studios (San Francisco, CA).
- Photography – Norman Seeff and Phil Kearns

== Charts ==
Chart (1977)	Peak position
Australia (Kent Music Report)	64
U.S. (Billboard 200)	29
