= 100 Proof (Aged in Soul) =

American musical group

100 Proof (Aged in Soul) was an American funk/soul group, who formed in Detroit, Michigan, in 1969. They were put together by former Motown songwriting team Holland-Dozier-Holland, signing the group to their new Hot Wax Records label. The group went on to release several hit singles between 1969 and 1972. The biggest of these was "Somebody's Been Sleeping", which reached number 8 on the Billboard Hot 100, sold more than one million copies, and was certified gold by the Recording Industry Association of America.

The group also recorded the track "She's Not Just Another Woman", which began to be played by radio stations due to the popularity, at that time, of "Somebody's Been Sleeping". Although "She's Not Just Another Woman" was originally intended to be an album track, the record label realised that they had another potential hit on their hands. However, on the belief that having another 100 Proof (Aged in Soul) track in the charts at the same time as Somebody's Been Sleeping, it was decided that the song would be released under the name of a separate group, 8th Day. This song would also prove to be a hit record, reaching number 11 on the [Billboard Hot 100] and number 3 on the R&B chart.

The group's first LP, Somebody's Been Sleeping in My Bed, was released by Hot Wax in 1970. Reviewing it in Christgau's Record Guide: Rock Albums of the Seventies (1981), Robert Christgau wrote: "The unidentified lead singer admires (or envies) David Ruffin, and not since early Smokey have so many proverbs and idioms—too many cooks, Johnny comes marching home, love is sweeter the second time around—squeezed onto one album. Plus the complete text of a 'sincere' champagne dinner seduction."

The group broke up in 1973, although the name was re-used for a totally different line-up of musicians for a short period in 1977.

== Members ==
- Steve Mancha (born Clyde Darnell Wilson; December 25, 1945 – January 8, 2011)
- Eddie Holiday (former lead singer of The Holidays), (born Eddie Anderson; deceased)
- Joe Stubbs (formerly of The Contours, The Originals, and The Falcons; brother of Levi Stubbs), (born Joseph Stubbles; 1942 – February 5, 1998)
- Carlis McKinley "Sonny" Monroe (former lead singer of The Falcons, The Firestones, and The Fabulous Playboys), (March 20, 1938 – March 24, 2009)
- Donald "Don" Hatcher (former bass player for the instrumental group the Fun Co, backing band for Bettye LaVette), (December 29, 1949 – 2005)
- Donnell "Doni" Hagan (Chicago studio and jobbing drummer)
- Herschel Hunter (Deceased, Former solo artist with Motown, member of The Monitors and The Martiniques vocal groups, elder brother of the late singer Ty Hunter a former member The Glass House and The Originals)

== Discography ==
=== Albums ===
- Somebody's Been Sleeping in My Bed (Hot Wax, 1970) U.S. number 151, U.S. R&B number 31
- 100 Proof (Hot Wax, 1972) US R&B number 40

=== Singles ===
| Year | Title | Chart Positions | |
| Year | Title | U.S. Pop Singles | U.S. R&B |
|---|---|---|---|
| 1969 | "Too Many Cooks (Spoil the Soup)" | 94 | 24 |
| 1969 | "Somebody's Been Sleeping" | 8 | 6 |
| 1971 | "One Man's Leftovers (Is Another Man's Feast)" | 96 | 37 |
| 1971 | "Driveway" | - | 33 |
| 1971 | "90 Day Freeze (On Her Love)" | - | 34 |
| 1972 | "Everything Good Is Bad" | 45 | 15 |
