= Phoebe Snow =

American singer, songwriter and guitarist (1950–2011)

Background information
- Born: Phoebe Ann Laub; July 17, 1950; New York City, U.S.
- Died: April 26, 2011 (aged 60) Edison, New Jersey, U.S.
- Cause of death: Cerebral hemorrhage
- Genres: Blues; folk; gospel; jazz; R&B; roots rock; soul
- Occupation: Singer-songwriter
- Instruments: Guitar; vocals
- Years active: 1972–2010
- Labels: Shelter; Columbia; Mirage; Elektra; Eagle; House of Blues

Phoebe Snow (born Phoebe Ann Laub; July 17, 1950 – April 26, 2011) was an American roots music singer-songwriter and guitarist, known for her hit 1974 and 1975 songs "Poetry Man" and "Harpo's Blues", and her credited guest vocals on Paul Simon’s "Gone at Last". She was described by The New York Times as a "contralto grounded in a bluesy growl and capable of sweeping over four octaves". Snow also sang numerous commercial jingles for many American products during the 1980s and 1990s, including General Foods International Coffees, Salon Selectives, and Stouffer's. Snow experienced success in Australia in the late 1970s and early 1980s with five top 100 albums in that country. In 1995, she recorded a gospel album with Sisters of Glory.

== Early life and education ==
Phoebe Ann Laub was born in New York City in 1950, and raised in a musical household in which Delta blues, Broadway show tunes, Dixieland jazz, classical music, and folk music recordings were played around the clock. Her father, Merrill Laub, an exterminator by trade, had an encyclopedic knowledge of American film and theater and was also an avid collector and restorer of antiques. Her mother, Lili Laub, was a dance teacher who had performed with the Martha Graham group. She was Jewish.

Snow was raised in Teaneck, New Jersey, and graduated from Teaneck High School in 1968. She subsequently attended Shimer College in Mount Carroll, Illinois for two years, but did not graduate. Back in New York, she carried her prized Martin 000-18 acoustic guitar from club to club in Greenwich Village, playing and singing on amateur nights. Her stage name came from an early 1900s fictional character featured in Delaware, Lackawanna, and Western Railroad ads. In painted and later photographic print images, the young woman "Phoebe Snow" was dressed all in white to emphasize the cleanliness of the line's passenger trains. (Lackawanna's locomotives at the time burned anthracite coal, which created less soot than bituminous coal.)

== Career ==
It was at The Bitter End club in 1972 that Denny Cordell, co-owner (with Leon Russell) of Shelter Records, was so taken by the singer that he signed her to the label and produced her first recording, recording at The Church Studio. She released the eponymous album, Phoebe Snow, including "San Francisco Bay Blues" and "Poetry Man", in 1974, featuring guest performances by The Persuasions, Zoot Sims, Teddy Wilson, David Bromberg, and Dave Mason.

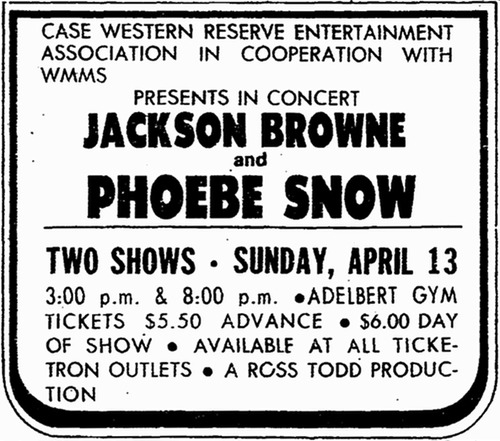
Print ad for 1975 concert featuring Jackson Browne and Phoebe Snow.

The album spawned a top five 1975 single on the Billboard Hot 100 with "Poetry Man" and was itself a top-five album in Billboard, for which she received a nomination for the Grammy Award for Best New Artist. The cover of Rolling Stone magazine followed, while she performed as the opening act for tours by Jackson Browne and Paul Simon. (She provided credited guest vocals backing Simon on the gospel-tinged hit single "Gone at Last" later in 1975—#23 on the Hot 100.) The same year, 1975, also brought the first of several appearances as a musical guest on Saturday Night Live, on which Snow performed both solo and in duets with Simon and Linda Ronstadt. During the 1975 appearance, she was seven months pregnant with her daughter, Valerie. Her backup vocal is heard on Simon's hit song "50 Ways to Leave Your Lover," along with Valerie Simpson and Patti Austin, from 1975. Both "Gone at Last" and "50 Ways to Leave Your Lover" appear on Simon's Grammy-winning 1975 album Still Crazy After All These Years.

Legal battles took place between Snow and Shelter Records. Snow ended up signed to Columbia Records. Her second album, Second Childhood, appeared in 1976, produced by Phil Ramone. It was jazzier and more introspective, and was a RIAA Certified Gold Album for Snow, with the Gold Album awarded on July 9, 1976. She moved to a more rock-oriented sound for It Looks Like Snow, released later in 1976 with David Rubinson producing. 1977 saw Never Letting Go, again with Ramone, while 1978's Against the Grain was helmed by Barry Beckett. After that, Snow parted ways with Columbia; she would later say that the stress of her parental obligations compromised her ability to make music effectively. In 1979, she toured extensively throughout the US and Canada with noted guitarist Arlen Roth as her lead guitarist and musical director. Her January 1979 cover of the Paul McCartney song "Every Night" reached No. 37 in the UK. In 1981, Snow, then signed with Mirage Records, released the album Rock Away, but the album disappointed music critic Geoffrey Himes.

The 1983 Rolling Stone Record Guide summed up Snow's career to that point by saying: "One of the most gifted voices of her generation, Phoebe Snow can do just about anything stylistically as well as technically. … The question that's still unanswered is how best to channel such talent."

Snow spent long periods away from recording, often singing commercial jingles for AT&T, General Foods International Coffees, Salon Selectives, Stouffer's, Hampton Bay Ceiling Fans, and others to support herself and her daughter. Snow recorded the theme song for the first season of the TV series 9 to 5. (Dolly Parton's vocals were used for the rest of the show's run.) Snow also sang the theme song for NBC's A Different World during the show's first season (1987–88).

In 1988, a duet with Dave Mason, called "Dreams I Dream," reached No. 11 on the US adult contemporary charts. Snow returned to recording with Something Real in 1989 and gathered a few more hits on the Adult Contemporary charts. Also, Snow composed WDIV-TV (Detroit)'s "Go 4 It!" campaign in 1980. She sang "Ancient Places, Sacred Lands", composed by Steve Horelick, on Reading Rainbow's tenth episode, The Gift of the Sacred Dog. The episode was based on the book of the same name by Paul Goble and was narrated by actor Michael Ansara. It was shot in Crow Agency, Montana, in 1983.

Snow performed in 1989 on stage at Avery Fisher Hall in New York City, as part of Our Common Future: a five-hour live television broadcast originating from several countries. Also that year, Snow sang the jingle for "Colon Blow", a breakfast cereal commercial parody featured on Saturday Night Live.

In 1990, she contributed a cover version of the Delaney & Bonnie song "Get Ourselves Together" to the Elektra compilation Rubáiyát, which included Earth Wind & Fire guitarist Dick Smith. In 1992, she toured with Donald Fagen's New York Rock and Soul Revue and was featured on the group's album recorded live at the Beacon Theatre in New York City. Throughout the 1990s, she made numerous appearances on the Howard Stern radio show. She sang live for specials and birthday shows. In 1997, she sang the Roseanne theme song a cappella during the closing moments of the final episode.

In 1995, Snow participated in The Wizard of Oz in Concert: Dreams Come True at the Lincoln Center in New York City, singing a distinctive medley of "If I Only Had a Brain; a Heart; the Nerve". In addition, the concert featured performances by Jewel, Joel Grey, Roger Daltrey, and Jackson Browne, among others. An album of the concert was released on compact disc on Rhino Records as catalog number R2 72405.

Snow joined with the pop group Zap Mama, who recorded its own version of Snow's "Poetry Man" in an impromptu duet on the PBS series Sessions at West 54th. Hawaiian girl group Na Leo Pilimehana also had a hit on the Adult Contemporary chart in 1999 with its cover version of "Poetry Man".

In May 1998, Snow received the Cultural Achievement Award from New York City Mayor Rudolph Giuliani.

Snow performed for US President Bill Clinton, First Lady Hillary Clinton, and his cabinet at Camp David in 1999.

In 2003, Snow released her album Natural Wonder on Eagle Records, containing 10 original tracks, her first original material in 14 years. Snow performed at Howard Stern's wedding in 2008, and made a special appearance in the film Noah's Arc: Jumping the Broom as herself. Some of her music was also featured on the soundtrack of the film. Her Live album (2008) featured many of her hits as well as a cover of "Piece of My Heart".

== Personal life and death ==
Between 1975 and 1978 Snow was married to Phil Kearns (who later came out as gay). She had a daughter, Valerie Rose, who was born with severe brain damage. Snow resolved not to institutionalize Valerie, and cared for her at home until Valerie died on March 19, 2007, at the age of 31. Snow's efforts to care for Valerie nearly ended her career. She continued to take voice lessons, and she studied opera informally.

Snow resided in Bergen County, New Jersey, and in her later years she embraced Buddhism.

Snow suffered a cerebral hemorrhage on January 19, 2010, and slipped into a coma. She died on April 26, 2011, at age 60 in Edison, New Jersey.

== Discography ==
=== Albums ===
Year	Album	Peak chart positions				Certifications	Record label
Year	Album	US	US R&B	US Jazz	AUS	Certifications	Record label
1974	Phoebe Snow	4	22	—	48	US: Gold	Shelter Records
1976	Second Childhood	13	33	—	71	US: Gold	Columbia
1976	It Looks Like Snow	29	—	—	64		Columbia
1977	Never Letting Go	73	36	—	—		Columbia
1978	Against the Grain	100	—	—	—		Columbia
1981	Rock Away	51	—	—	—		Mirage
1989	Something Real	75	—	—	—		Elektra
1991	The New York Rock and Soul Revue: Live at the Beacon	—	—	—	—		Giant
1995	Good News in Hard Times (with the Sisters of Glory)	—	—	—	—		Warner Bros.
1998	I Can't Complain	—	—	—	—		House of Blues
2003	Natural Wonder	—	—	—	—		Eagle Records
2008	Live	—	—	17	—		Verve Records
"—" denotes a recording that did not chart or was not released in that territory.

=== Compilations ===
- 1981: The Best of Phoebe Snow
- 1995: P.S.
- 2001: The Very Best of Phoebe Snow
- 2012: Playlist: The Very Best of Phoebe Snow

=== Singles ===
Year	Song	Peak chart positions						
Year	Song	US Adult	US R&B	US Pop	UK	AUS	CAN	NZL
1974	"Good Times (Let the Good Times Roll)"	―	―	—	―	―	―	―
1974	"Poetry Man"	1	―	5	―	60	4	28
1974	"Harpo's Blues"	20	―	—	―	―	―	―
1975	"Gone at Last" (with Paul Simon)	9	―	23	―	95	29	―
1976	"Two-Fisted Love"	―	―	—	―	―	―	―
1976	"All Over"	―	―	—	―	―	―	―
1976	"Shakey Ground"	―	―	70	―	―	―	6
1977	"Teach Me Tonight"	―	―	—	―	―	―	―
1977	"Never Letting Go"	―	―	—	―	―	―	―
1977	"Love Makes a Woman"	―	87	―	―	―	―	―
1978	"In My Life" (only released in the UK, Australia and New Zealand)	―	―	—	―	―	―	―
1978	"Every Night"	―	―	—	37	22	—	6
1981	"Games"	―	―	46	―	95	―	―
1981	"Mercy, Mercy, Mercy"	―	―	52	―	―	―	―
1981	"Baby Please"	―	―	―	―	―	―	―
1988	"Dreams I Dream" (with Dave Mason)	11	―	—	―	―	―	―
1989	"If I Can Just Get Through the Night"	13	―	—	—	85	63	―
1989	"Something Real"	29	―	—	―	―	―	―
"—" denotes releases that did not chart or were not released in that territory.

=== With other artists ===
Year	Single	Album	Other Artist	Note
1975	"50 Ways to Leave Your Lover"	Still Crazy After All These Years	Paul Simon	only backing vocals
1975	"Gone at Last"	Still Crazy After All These Years	Paul Simon	
1975	"Hymn"	Aftertones	Janis Ian	
1976	"Smile"	David Sanborn	David Sanborn	
1977	"Everybody Has a Dream"	The Stranger	Billy Joel	Only background vocals
1978	"Reelin'"	One-Eyed Jack	Garland Jeffreys	
1980	"Sometimes Love Forgets"	Hot Spot	Steve Goodman	
1982	"You Really Got a Hold on Me"	Bobby McFerrin	Bobby McFerrin	
1982	"Hammer & Nails"	Experiment in White	Janis Siegel	
1982	"Whether or Not the World Gets Better"	Roll It	Jimmy Salvemini	
1984	"Gravity's Angel"	Mister Heartbreak	Laurie Anderson	Only background vocals
1984	"Eenie, Meenie, Minie, Moe"	You're Gettin' Even While I'm Gettin' Odd	The J. Geils Band	Only background vocals
1984	"Thankful N'Thoughtful"	Night Lines	Dave Grusin	
1984	"Between Old and New York"	Night Lines	Dave Grusin	
1987	"The One"	Unchain My Heart	Joe Cocker	
1987	"Dreams I Dream"	Two Hearts	Dave Mason	
1990	"Don't Piss Me Off"	Funk of Ages	Bernie Worrell	
1991	"Club Soul City"	Scene of the Crime	Killer Joe	
1991	"Tossin' and Turnin'"	Johnnie Be Back	Johnnie Johnson	
1991	"Don't Like the Way You Look at My Love"	Russ Irwin	Russ Irwin	Only background vocals
1992	"Knock on Wood"	The New York Rock and Soul Revue	Michael McDonald	
1993	"A Lover's Question"	Portrait of the Blues	Lou Rawls	
1993	"Inner City Blues"	The World's Most Dangerous Party	Paul Shaffer & the Party Boys of Rock 'N' Roll	
1993	"My Emotion"	"Yuri" Original Soundtrack	Hiroshi Fujiwara	
1994	"The Feeling"	Robotix	Program 2	
1996	"Baby I'm Yours"	Naked City	Avenue Blue feat. Jeff Golub	
1996	"Three Little Birds"	One World!	Gregory Abbott	
1997	"People Get Ready"	Ladysmith Black Mambazo & Friends	Ladysmith Black Mambazo	
1999	"Fugitive of Love"	The Importance of Being	Ernest Kohl	
1999	"The Best Thing"	In My Head	Robert Lamm	
1999	"Swept Away"	In My Head	Robert Lamm	
1999	"One Too Many Mornings"	Portraits of Bob Dylan	Steve Howe	
2003	"Will You Love Me Tomorrow"	Harmony	Will & Rainbow	
2003	"For the Love of You"	Harmony	Will & Rainbow	
2003	"Trouble in Mind"	Harmony	Will & Rainbow	
2004	"B-itch/Dumb A-ss"	Back In 20	Gary U.S. Bonds	
2008	"Pray for the USA"	Yes We Can!	Maria Muldaur, Women's Voices For Peace Choir	
2009	"Monkey Around"	Etruscan Soul	Rob Paparozzi	
2018	"Oh Happy Day"	Christmas at the Vatican	CeCe Peniston & Thelma Houston	Recorded Live at The Aula Paolo VI, Vatican City.

=== Various-artists compilations ===
- 1982: "9 to 5" (9 to 5 TV programs theme song (1982–1983, 1986–1988) First Season Opening Theme) – Dolly Parton cover
- 1989: "Darling Be Home Soon" ([Rude Awakening Original Motion Picture Soundtrack album) — The Lovin' Spoonful cover
- 1990: "Get Ourselves Together" (Rubáiyát: Elektra's 40th Anniversary album) — Delaney, Bonnie & Friends cover
- 1995: "Merry Christmas Baby" (Winter Fire & Snow album) — Johnny Moore's Three Blazers cover
- 1997: "Time and Love" (Time and Love – The Music of Laura Nyro album) — Laura Nyro cover
- 2002: "Single Again" (Sincerely -Mariya Takeuchi Songbook- album) — Mariya Takeuchi cover
- 2002: "Always Here for You" (Once in a Lifetime -Mayo Okamoto Songbook- album) — Mayo Okamoto cover, Original song title "Dear..."
- 2003: "Beams of Heaven" (Shout, Sister, Shout! – a Tribute to Sister Rosetta Tharpe album) — Sister Rosetta Tharpe cover
- 2012: "In My Girlish Days" (....First Came Memphis Minnie album) — Memphis Minnie cover

== See also ==
- Chicago blues
