= She's Not Just Another Woman =

Single by 8th Day

from the album 8th Day
- B-side: "I Can't Fool Myself"
- Released: March 1971
- Genre: Funk
- Length: 3:00
- Label: Invictus
- Songwriters: Ron Dunbar, Clyde Wilson
- Producer: Holland–Dozier–Holland

8th Day singles chronology
"She's Not Just Another Woman" (1971)	"You've Got to Crawl (Before You Walk)" (1971)

"She's Not Just Another Woman" is a song written by Ron Dunbar and Clyde Wilson and performed by 8th Day. It reached #3 on the U.S. R&B chart and spent three weeks at #11 on the U.S. pop chart and #10 in Canada in 1971. It was featured on their 1971 album 8th Day.

The song was produced by Holland–Dozier–Holland.

The song ranked #64 on Billboard magazine's Top 100 singles of 1971.

== Chart history ==
=== Weekly charts ===
Chart (1971)	Peak position
Canada RPM Top Singles	10
U.S. Billboard Hot 100	11
U.S. Billboard R&B	3
U.S. Cash Box Top 100	8

=== Year-end charts ===
Chart (1971)	Rank
U.S. Billboard Hot 100	64
U.S. Cash Box	63

== Other versions ==
- 100 Proof (Aged in Soul) released a version of the song on their 1971 album Somebody's Been Sleeping in My Bed.
- Phoebe Snow released a version of the song entitled "He's Not Just Another Man" on her 1978 album Against the Grain.

== Samplings ==
- 8th Day's version was sampled on the 1989 song "She's Not Just Another Woman (Monique)" by Biz Markie on his album The Biz Never Sleeps.
- 8th Day's version was sampled on the 1990 single "Born and Raised in Compton" by DJ Quik.
