= Salon Selectives =

Hair care products

- Product type: Hair care
- Current owner: Evergreen Consumer Brands
- Country: United States
- Introduced: 1987
- Markets: North America
- Previous owners: Helene Curtis Industries, Inc.; Unilever; CLT International

Salon Selectives is a line of hair care products, ranging from shampoos and hair conditioners to hair mousses, sprays, gels, and oils.

== History ==
Introduced by Helene Curtis in 1987, Salon Selectives is the first salon-inspired mass market hair care brand. It was acquired by Unilever in 1996 and was restructured in 2000 with all-new products. In 2011, the line was relaunched again with 32-ounce bottles intended to give consumers salon grade product at affordable pricing.

=== Original lineup (1987–2000) ===
When introduced in 1987, Salon Selectives was conceived as a level-based product line of shampoos, conditioners, and styling products. The shampoos had rosy-red bottles with level numbers, while Salon Selectives conditioners were in lighter pink bottles bearing letter labels signifying type. The brand proved to be a success, with a 6.5 percent market share and annual sales of $275 million in the late 90s (second most successful US hair care brand).

=== Theme-based lineup (2000–2006) ===
During 2000, the Salon Selectives product line was revamped. Most notably, the product line was housed in clear containers. The then-new theme-based product line was introduced in September 2000; products bore catchy names.

=== Brand revitalization (early 2011) ===
In 2010, the rights to the Salon Selectives brand was acquired by CLT International, a global health and beauty trader and brand acquisition company. CLT brought back a line of hair care products (including shampoo, conditioner, styling aids and hair brushes) in early 2011. The red and pink bottles and green apple scent have been restored. In addition to conventional advertising vehicles, CLT International is launching an aggressive social media campaign (featuring sites like Facebook and Twitter) to target a younger and broader demographic.

Salon Selectives is, as of 2018, being marketed as a discount brand, with its standard size bottle available at a constant one-dollar price point.

=== Acquisition by ECB (2018) ===
Salon Selectives was acquired by Evergreen Consumer Brands on May 31, 2018.
