= Something Real (Phoebe Snow album) =

Studio album by Phoebe Snow
- Released: 1989
- Studios: Hit Factory (New York City); Power Station (New York City)
- Genre: Pop
- Length: 40:49
- Label: Elektra
- Producers: Rob Fraboni; Ricky Fataar; Russ Titelman; Phil Ramone

Phoebe Snow chronology
Rock Away (1981)	Something Real (1989)	The New York Rock and Soul Revue: Live at the Beacon (1991)

Something Real is the seventh studio album by the American musician Phoebe Snow, released in 1989 by Elektra Records. It was her first album in eight years. While caring for her disabled daughter, Snow spent five years making demo tapes and mailing them to labels.

The album peaked at No. 75 on the Billboard 200.

== Background ==
According to music executive Charles Koppelman, who had headed Columbia Records music publishing department at the time Snow was on the Columbia roster, his interest in Snow was captured after he recognized her voice singing the jingle for a Bloomingdale's television commercial. Koppelman attended Snow's Bottom Line gig in July 1986 and—deeming her performance a "knockout"—he began to champion Snow's return to recording. With Koppelman's support, Snow was signed to Elektra by the year's end:

== Production ==
The album was produced by Rob Fraboni and Ricky Fataar; Russ Titelman also worked on the album. Mick Taylor played guitar on "Cardiac Arrest". Lou Marini and Tom Scott led the horn section.

Snow shot a video, her first, for the album's first single, "If I Can Just Get Through the Night". The track "Something Real", which served as the second single and video, was hailed by Washington Post music critic Joe Brown as "'Poetry Man' revisited...[The earlier] song's ingenuously adulterous protagonist has wised up in a decade. This time around, she wants—quoting the lyrics of "Something Real"—something real - something I don't have to steal." Snow would state her vision for the song was "not [as] a vulnerable fragile song...I thought it could be a more powerful R&B ballad like something Whitney Houston might sing but everybody who heard my homemade demo thought [that acoustic version] was too good to change."

== Critical reception ==
Professional ratings
Review scores
Source	Rating
AllMusic	3/5 stars
The Encyclopedia of Popular Music	3/5 stars
Los Angeles Times	2.5/4 stars
MusicHound R&B: The Essential Album Guide	3.5/5 stars
The Rolling Stone Album Guide	3/5 stars
Vancouver Sun	3/5 stars

The Los Angeles Times thought that, "while this album is classy and polished, there isn't much that approaches classic Snow territory, aside from 'We Might Never Feel This Way Again', with its touching, grab-the-moment romanticism, and the softly tender 'I'm Your Girl', which Snow wrote for her late mother." The Buffalo News wrote that the singer "still has trouble resisting instrumental sucrose in the background, but the sound of Phoebe Snow singing 'I'm Your Girl' or 'If I Can Just Get Through the Night' is the essence of pop authenticity." The Boston Globe concluded that Something Real "has a couple of slick, poorly chosen cover songs, but her four original songs on the album are sparkling."

The Vancouver Sun opined that "the highly produced musical packaging feels too slick and hip for conveying truly honest emotions." The Washington Post declared: "With a voice that's equally suited to pop, R&B and gospel, she has no difficulty reviving the old Emotions' hit 'Best of My Love' or emulating James Taylor's tuneful insouciance on 'Soothin'', but other song choices don't pan out nearly as well." The New York Times deemed Something Real Snow's "most coherent album," writing that her "excesses are reined in just enough to make her sound bighearted and benevolent rather than overwrought."

AllMusic called the album "a sturdy, respectable set," writing that Snow "tends to de-emphasize the more unusual aspects of her voice, although not so much that you'd confuse it with anybody else's."

== Aftermath ==
At the time of the album's release, Snow said: “We've made our statement on this record: it's got the right amount of everything. But I want my next [album] to reduce the margin for error—[to have] strong powerful music ... that expresses how I envision myself." Snow would abandon the recording of her second Elektra album after cutting six tracks which "were just wrong. They weren't who I am. I was like the gal singer who phoned her part in." Snow asked for release from her contract and recorded her final two studio albums, I Can't Complain and Natural Wonder, for independent labels.

== Track listing ==
No.	Title	Writer(s)	Length
1.	"Something Real"	Phoebe Snow	3:50
2.	"Mr. Wondering"	Don Yowell	3:21
3.	"Touch Your Soul"	Snow	4:36
4.	"We Might Never Feel This Way Again"	Rhonda Schuster	3:50
5.	"I'm Your Girl"	Snow	5:21
6.	"If Can Just Get Through the Night"	Peter Anders	4:09
7.	"Stay Away"	Sue Sheridan, Sue Shifrin	4:14
8.	"Soothin'"	Jae Mason	4:06
9.	"Best of My Love"	Al McKay, Maurice White	3:48
10.	"Cardiac Arrest"	Snow	3:34

== Personnel ==
- Phoebe Snow – vocals, acoustic guitar (1, 3), backing vocals (2, 8), harmony vocals (2, 6, 10)

Session players/ singers

- Robbie Kondor – keyboards (1, 6, 8), synth string arrangements (2)
- Joy Askew – keyboards (2, 6–8), acoustic piano (2)
- Jeff Bova – keyboards (3, 5)
- Robbie Kilgore – keyboards (3, 5)
- Rob Mounsey – keyboards (3, 5)
- Eric Rehl – keyboards (4), drums (4)
- Ivan Neville – keyboards (8), acoustic piano (10), Hammond B3 organ (10)
- David Frank – keyboards (9), arrangements (9)
- Pat Thrall – guitars (2, 6–8)
- John McCurry – guitars (4)
- Mick Taylor – guitars (5, 7, 10)
- Larry DeBari – guitars (6)
- Shane Fontayne – guitars (10)
- Ricky Fataar – bass (1), percussion (1, 2, 7, 10), drums (2, 5–8, 10), additional drums (3), acoustic guitar (7), guitars (8), backing vocals (8)
- Anthony Jackson – bass (2, 6–8)
- Jimmy Bralower – drum machine programming (3, 5)
- Errol "Crusher" Bennett – percussion (8)
- Carol Steele – percussion (9)
- Paul McGovern – saxophone (2)
- Tom Scott – alto saxophone (9)
- Lou Marini – saxophones (9)
- Bob Mintzer – saxophones (9)
- Dave Bargeron – trombone (9)
- Randy Brecker – trumpet (9)
- Jon Faddis – trumpet (9)
- Darryl Johnson – backing vocals (6, 7, 10), bass (10)

Session players/ singers (cont.)

- Blondie Chaplin – backing vocals (8)
- Lani Groves – backing vocals (9)
- Brenda King – backing vocals (9)
- Vaneese Thomas – backing vocals (9)

Production

- Phoebe Snow – pre-production
- Ricky Fataar – producer (1, 2, 6–8, 10)
- Rob Fraboni – producer (1, 2, 6–8, 10)
- Russ Titelman – producer (3, 5, 9)
- Phil Ramone – producer (4)
- Steve Boyer – recording (1, 2, 6–8, 10), mixing (1, 2, 6–8, 10)
- Steve Rinkoff – recording (3, 5, 9), mixing (3, 5, 9)
- Jay Healy – recording (4), mixing (4)
- Joe Pirrera – recording (4), mixing (4)
- Bruce Calder – additional engineer (1, 2, 6–8, 10), assistant engineer (1, 2, 6–8, 10)
- Dan Gellert – assistant engineer (3, 5, 9)
- Bob Ludwig – mastering at Masterdisk (New York City, New York)
- Karen Fine – production coordinator (1, 2, 6–8, 10)
- Jill Dell'Abate – production coordinator (3, 5, 9)
- Alexandra Saraspe-Conomos – production assistant (3, 5, 9)
- Carol Bobolts – art direction
- Michele Clement – photography
