= Somebody's Been Sleeping =

Single by 100 Proof (Aged In Soul)

from the album Somebody's Been Sleeping In My Bed
- B-side: "I've Come To Save You"
- Released: July 1970
- Genre: Soul, R&B, funk
- Length: 2:46
- Label: Hot Wax; HS 7004
- Songwriters: Angelo Bond; General Johnson; Greg Perry
- Producer: Greg Perry

100 Proof (Aged In Soul) singles chronology
"Too Many Cooks Spoil The Broth" (1969)	"Somebody's Been Sleeping" (1970)	"If I Could See The Light In The Window" (1969)

"Somebody's Been Sleeping" is a 1969 song recorded by American funk and soul group 100 Proof (Aged In Soul).

== Background ==
Songwriting-production team Holland-Dozier-Holland had left Motown Records in 1967 over a dispute about royalties, and set up their own label, Hot Wax/Invictus, shortly after. They put together 100 Proof as a funk and soul act for their new label. Joe Stubbs, formerly of Motown groups The Contours and The Originals, was made co-lead singer, along with Steve Mancha (who provides lead vocals on this track).

== Details ==
Written by General Johnson (lead singer of Chairmen Of The Board), Angelo Bond, and Greg Perry (who also acted as producer), the song depicts a cheated lover discovering evidence of his woman's infidelity, with both a nod to the folk tale "Jack and the Beanstalk" and quoting liberally from the folk tale "Goldilocks and the Three Bears". Released as 100 Proof's second single, it became a Top Ten hit on the US pop chart, reaching No.8 in 1970, and performed even better on the R&B chart, making it to No.6. Although the group would continue to score R&B hits up until their break-up in 1973, none of their singles reached the same level of success. "Somebody's Been Sleeping" also sold over a million copies and was certified gold by the RIAA.
