= Against the Grain (Phoebe Snow album) =

Studio album by Phoebe Snow
- Released: October 1978
- Studio: A&R Recording, New York City, New York); Muscle Shoals Sound Studios (Sheffield, Alabama)
- Genre: Soft rock
- Label: Columbia
- Producer: Phil Ramone, Barry Beckett

Phoebe Snow chronology
Never Letting Go (1977)	Against the Grain (1978)	Rock Away (1981)

Against the Grain is the fifth album by singer-songwriter Phoebe Snow, released in 1978.

== Overview ==
At the time of the release of Against the Grain, Phoebe Snow called it her "rockiest" album, "a deliberate turning away from the jazz influences" of her earlier recordings.

Rising no higher than #100 on the Billboard 200, Against the Grain became Snow's second album to seriously under-perform, ending her association with Columbia Records. Snow would have one album release in the next ten years, which was Rock Away, touted as her move into "rock-&-roll". In interviews concurrent with the 1981 release of Rock Away, Snow would label Against the Grain a "disaster": "[it] tried to be a rock album but had too many opinions. Everybody who played, sang or cleaned up the studio produced that album...Putting [Paul McCartney's "Every Night"]" - which afforded Snow a hit in the UK and Australia - "was the one idea of mine that filtered through."

== Critical reception ==
Professional ratings
Review scores
Source	Rating
Allmusic	3.5/5 stars
Christgau's Record Guide	C+
Smash Hits	6/10

Peter Reilly of Stereo Review recognized the album's intent to "mark [Snow's] entrance into Outright Rock-&-Roll", dismissing it as "merely a paraphrase of real rock" and lamenting that "a singer who...has shown a real flair for projecting a lyric with poignancy and feeling has made such an awkward and clumsy turnabout." In a retrospective review for Allmusic, critic William Ruhlmann wrote of the album "The decision to add Barry Beckett as co-producer with Phil Ramone helped add an R&B depth and fervor, but 'Against the Grain' was just a more impassioned effort than its predecessor."

Robert Christgau of the Village Voice declared, "this time she dies on the non-originals...Paul McCartney's Every Night' shows up the hooklessness of almost everything else." Susan Toepfer of the New York Daily News claimed, "Snow may finally be finding her direction with this, her most straight-ahead rock album."

== Track listing ==
Songs written by Phoebe Snow, except where noted.

Side One

1. "Every Night" (Paul McCartney) – 3:31
2. "Do Right Woman, Do Right Man" (Chips Moman, Dan Penn) – 4:08
3. "He's Not Just Another Man" (Clyde Wilson, Brian Holland) – 2:59
4. "Random Time" – 3:39
5. "In My Life" (Patti Austin) – 5:02

Side Two

1. "You Have Not Won" – 4:22
2. "Mama Don't Break Down" – 3:06
3. "Oh L.A." – 3:17
4. "The Married Men" (Maggie Roche) – 3:44
5. "Keep a Watch on the Shoreline" – 4:39

== Charts ==
Chart (1979)	Peak position
Australia (Kent Music Report)	9

== Personnel ==
- Phoebe Snow – lead vocals (1–5, 7–10), backing vocals (1–3, 5, 7–10), acoustic guitar (4, 10), all vocals (6)
- Barry Beckett – acoustic piano (1, 9, 10), keyboards (2, 4, 5, 7, 8), synthesizers (4, 5, 8, 10)
- Richard Tee – electric piano (3, 10)
- Dave Grusin – keyboards (6)
- Steve Burgh – lead electric guitar (1, 3, 10), electric guitar (2, 5, 7, 8), acoustic guitar (4, 9), slide guitar (7, 9)
- Steve Khan – electric guitar (1, 3–9), acoustic guitar (4), electric guitar solo (6), electric 12-string guitar (10)
- Hugh McCracken – acoustic guitar (1, 2, 4, 8, 10), electric guitar (3, 7, 9), acoustic 12-string guitar (5)
- Jeff Mironov – electric guitar (6), acoustic guitar (6)
- Warren Nichols – pedal steel guitar (1)
- Will Lee – bass guitar (1, 3, 4, 7, 9, 10)
- Hugh MacDonald – bass guitar (2, 5, 8)
- Doug Stegmeyer – bass guitar (6)
- Rick Marotta – drums (1–5, 7–10), Syndrums
- Liberty DeVitto – drums (6)
- Ralph MacDonald – percussion (2–4, 7–10)
- Jon Faddis – flugelhorn solo (4)
- Michael Brecker – saxophone solo (7)
- Corky Hale – harp (5)
- Michael Gray – backing vocals (2, 7)
- Margo Chapman – backing vocals (3)
- Linda LaPresti – backing vocals (3)
- Lani Groves – backing vocals (5)
- Gwen Guthrie – backing vocals (5)

Horns (Tracks 2, 3, 7 & 9)

- David Matthews – arrangements
- Ronnie Cuber – baritone saxophone
- Tom Malone – saxophones
- George Young – saxophones
- Michael Brecker – tenor saxophone
- Wayne Andre – trombone
- Sam Burtis – trombone
- Keith O'Quinn – trombone
- Randy Brecker – trumpet
- John Gatchell – trumpet
- Lew Soloff – trumpet

== Production ==
- Barry Beckett – producer, remix engineer, mixing (1–5, 7–10)
- Phil Ramone – producer, mixing (6)
- Glenn Berger – basic track engineer
- Jim Boyer – engineer (3–7, 9, 10)
- Elliot Scheiner – engineer (8)
- Burt Szerlip – overdubbing
- Steve Melton – remix engineer
- Ted Jensen – mastering at Sterling Sound (New York City, New York)
- Paula Scher – design
- Benno Friedman – photography
