= 8th Day (R&B group) =

American R&B group

8th Day was an American R&B group from Detroit, Michigan.

== History ==
The Holland–Dozier–Holland (HDH) songwriting team had scored hits in 1970 with the group 100 Proof (Aged in Soul). When the latter's song "Somebody's Been Sleeping in My Bed" became a hit, radio stations also began playing the tune "She's Not Just Another Woman". HDH wanted to release the song as another single but did not want to hurt the sales of "Somebody's Been Sleeping in My Bed", so they released "She's Not Just Another Woman" on Invictus Records under the name 8th Day in 1971. The song, written by Clyde Wilson (a member of 100 Proof who performed under the name of Steve Mancha) and Ronald Dunbar and produced by HDH, became a hit, peaking at No. 11 in the U.S. Billboard chart. The record sold over a million copies and received a gold disc from the Recording Industry Association of America on September 15, 1971.

A second song released under the 8th Day name, "You've Got to Crawl (Before You Walk)", also hit the charts later that year, and so HDH put together an actual group under the name, but their later recordings did not sell nearly as well as the first two, and the group quickly fizzled after a few more minor hits. The group name was resurrected in 1983 for a Brian Holland and Harold Beatty production featuring Virginia “Vee” McDonald and Tyrone Douglas, formerly of The Undisputed Truth. Barrington “Bo” Henderson formerly of The Temptations and Lakeside and member Denzil Broomfield.

== Members ==
- Melvin Davis - vocals
- Antonio "Tony" Newton - bass
- Lyman Woodard - Organ, Keyboards
- Larry Hutchison - Guitar
- Ron Bykowski -
- Michael Anthony - guitar
- Bruce Nazarian - guitar, vocals
- Jerry Paul - percussion
- Lynn Harter -
- Carole Stallings - violin
- Anita Sherman - vibraphone

== Discography ==
=== Albums ===
- 8th Day (1971)

Media : LP Label : Invictus Pressing : ST-7306 U.S. Charts: U.S. No. 131, Hot R&B Albums No. 42

- I Gotta Get Home (Can't Let My Baby Get Lonely) (1973)

Media : LP Label : Invictus Pressing : ST-9809 U.S.

- The 8th Day (1983)

Media : LP Label : A&M Pressing : SP 4942 U.S.

=== Singles ===
| Year | Title | Chart Positions | |
| Year | Title | Billboard Hot 100 | R&B |
|---|---|---|---|
| 1971 | "She's Not Just Another Woman" [Invictus 9087] | 11 | 3 |
| 1971 | "You've Got to Crawl (Before You Walk)" [Invictus 9098] | 28 | 3 |
| 1972 | "Eeny-Meeny-Miny-Mo (Three's a Crowd)" [Invictus 9117] | - | 29 |
| 1972 | "If I Could See the Light" [Invictus 9107] | 79 | 27 |
