= Na Leo Pilimehana =

- Genres: Hawaiian
- Years active: 1984–present
- Label: Sony Music Entertainment Japan
- Awards: 23 Nā Hōkū Hanohano Awards; Hawaiian Music Hall of Fame
- Members: Nalani Jenkins; Lehua Kalima; Angela Morales
- Website: naleopilimehana.com

Na Leo Pilimehana (also known as Nā Leo Pilimehana or Na Leo) is a contemporary Hawaiian musical trio consisting of Nalani Jenkins, Lehua Kalima, and Angela Morales. Established in 1984, the group is noted for its three-part vocal harmonies and its role in the Hawaiian Contemporary genre, which integrates traditional Hawaiian themes with pop and adult contemporary arrangements. They are recognized as the biggest selling female Hawaiian group worldwide. The group's name, Nā Leo Pilimehana, translates from Hawaiian as "The Voices Blending Together in Warmth."

== History ==
The members formed the group while attending Kamehameha Schools in Honolulu. In 1984, as high school seniors, they entered the "Brown Bags to Stardom" talent competition and won with an original composition, "Local Boys." The track became the best-selling single in the history of the Hawaiian music industry at that time. Their debut album, also titled Local Boys, was released in late 1984. Their 1996 album Flying with Angels gained national attention on the U.S. mainland, with tracks appearing on the national Top 25 adult contemporary charts.

Na Leo has released over 24 albums throughout their career. In May 2024, the group celebrated their 40th anniversary with a benefit concert at Windward Community College, with proceeds supporting Hawaiian music scholarships.

== Awards ==
The group has received over 20 Nā Hōkū Hanohano Awards from the Hawaiʻi Academy of Recording Arts. Notable recognitions include:

- Song of the Year: "Friends" (1994), "Flying with Angels" (1996)
- Album of the Year: Friends (1994), Colours (1999)
- Group of the Year: Multiple years including 1995, 1996, 1997, 1998, 1999, and 2000.

== Discography ==
- Local Boys (1984)
- Friends (1993)
- Flying with Angels (1995)
- Colours (1998)
- Pocketful of Smiles (1999)
- Find Your Light (2004)
- Beautiful Day (2018)
