= Phoebe Snow (album) =

Studio album by Phoebe Snow
- Released: July 1974
- Recorded: 1973
- Genre: Folk jazz
- Length: 35:36
- Label: Shelter
- Producers: Dino Airali, Denny Cordell, Phil Ramone

Phoebe Snow chronology
Phoebe Snow (1974)	Second Childhood (1976)

Phoebe Snow is the debut album by American roots music singer-songwriter Phoebe Snow, released in 1974. It contains her Top 5 Billboard hit, "Poetry Man", and opens with her cover of Sam Cooke's R&B hit "Good Times".

== Background ==
Sessions were held in Los Angeles, Nashville and in Tulsa to find the right approach for the album. "She’d play with whoever was around and we’d record and analyze the recordings, try and work out what was ideal for each song, which approach to take," said Shelter president Denny Cordell. "I think she found that rather a long and painful study, but it obviously had its rewards." After the album's release, legal battles took place between Snow and Shelter Records. Snow eventually signed with Columbia Records. It would be two years before her next release on Columbia.

== Reception ==
Professional ratings
Review scores
Source	Rating
Allmusic	4.5/5 stars
Christgau's Record Guide	B+

In a retrospective review for Allmusic, critic Alex Henderson called Snow "a pearl of a singer who never caught on because she simply didn't fit neatly into any one category... With as many risks as she takes, the album is generally quite accessible." Robert Christgau called the album "This woman's languorous, swaying folk-jazz fusion is striking enough to suggest that her debut LP will become some sort of cult item. And it's better than most cult items... The plus is for encouragement, and for the graceful way her voice combines nasality and smoothness."

== Track listing ==
All songs by Phoebe Snow, except where noted

1. "Good Times" (Sam Cooke) – 2:20
2. "Harpo's Blues" – 4:22
3. "Poetry Man" – 4:36
4. "Either or Both" – 3:52
5. "San Francisco Bay Blues" (Jesse Fuller) – 3:29
6. "I Don't Want the Night to End" – 3:55
7. "Take Your Children Home" – 4:15
8. "It Must Be Sunday" – 5:50
9. "No Show Tonight" – 2:57

=== CD (DCC label Only) bonus tracks ===
10. "Easy Street" [original "B Side" of Harpo's Blues single] – 3:20
11. "Good Times" [original demo] (Cooke) – 2:39
12. "Harpo's Blues" [original demo] – 4:55
13. "I Don't Want the Night to End" [original demo] – 3:55
14. "It Must Be Sunday" [original demo] – 6:42
15. "San Francisco Bay Blues" [original demo] (Fuller) – 4:09
16. "Poetry Man" [original demo] – 3:43

== Personnel ==
- Phoebe Snow – vocals, acoustic guitar
- Bob James – organ (2, 3, 6, 7, 8)
- Teddy Wilson – acoustic piano (2)
- Steve Burgh – electric guitar (1, 6, 9)
- David Bromberg – acoustic lead guitar (4), rhythm guitar (4), dobro (4)
- Dave Mason – electric lead guitar (9)
- Hugh McDonald – electric bass (1, 6, 9)
- Chuck Domanico – acoustic bass (2, 3, 7, 8)
- Chuck Israels – acoustic bass (5)
- Steve Mosley – drums (1, 2, 6, 9), percussion (8)
- Ralph MacDonald – percussion (2, 3, 7)
- Margaret Ross – harp (2, 3, 7)
- Zoot Sims – tenor saxophone (2, 3, 8)
- The Persuasions – backing vocals (1)

== Production ==
- Dino Airali – producer
- Phil Ramone – co-producer, engineer, mixing
- Steve Hoffman – engineer
- Tom Baker – assistant engineer
- Glenn Berger – assistant engineer
- Bob Schaper – assistant engineer
- Roberta Ballard – production manager
- Ed Caraeff – photography
- Mick Haggerty – cover artwork
- Recorded at A & R Recording (New York, NY) and Producer's Workshop (Hollywood, CA).
- Mixed at A & R Recording

== Charts ==
=== Weekly charts ===
Chart (1974–75)	Peak position
Australia (Kent Music Report)	45
Canada Top Albums/CDs (RPM)	13
New Zealand Albums (RMNZ)	31
US Billboard 200	4

=== Year-end charts ===
Chart (1975)	Position
Canada Top Albums/CDs (RPM)	87
US Billboard 200	5

== Certifications ==
Region	Certification	Certified units/sales
United States (RIAA)	Gold	500,000^{^}
^{^} Shipments figures based on certification alone.
