= Searching for Sugar Man (soundtrack) =

Soundtrack album by Rodriguez
- Released: 24 July 2012
- Recorded: 1969–1972
- Length: 51:03
- Label: Light in the Attic / Legacy

Searching for Sugar Man is the 2012 soundtrack album from the documentary, Searching for Sugar Man, containing a compilation of songs by Rodriguez from his two studio albums. As a result of the popularity of the documentary, the album climbed high for a soundtrack album in some national album charts. In Sweden, it reached #3 in early 2013 when the Academy Award nomination was announced, and had been in the charts for 26 weeks by the time it received the award in February 2013; in Denmark it reached #18; and in New Zealand it reached #9. The album was released by Light in the Attic / Legacy records and distributed by Sony Music Entertainment in a cooperative arrangement. All tracks were remastered by Dave Cooley of Elysian Masters.

== Track listing ==
1. "Sugar Man" (3:50)
2. "Crucify Your Mind" (2:32)
3. "Cause" (5:29)
4. "I Wonder" (2:34)
5. "Like Janis" (2:37)
6. "This Is Not a Song, It's an Outburst: Or, the Establishment Blues" (2:07)
7. "Can't Get Away" (3:56)
8. "I Think of You" (3:26)
9. "Inner City Blues" (3:27)
10. "Sandrevan Lullaby – Lifestyles" (6:39)
11. "Street Boy" (3:47)
12. "A Most Disgusting Song" (4:48)
13. "I'll Slip Away" (2:51)
14. "Jane S. Piddy" (3:00)

Notes

- Tracks 1, 2, 4, 5, 6, 9 and 14 are taken from the album Cold Fact
- Tracks 3, 8, 10 and 12 are from the album Coming from Reality
- Tracks 7, 11 and 13 were recorded for Rodriguez' unfinished third album and were first released on the 1977 Australian compilation album Rodriguez at His Best. The three tracks were later included as bonus tracks on the Coming from Reality 2009 US re-issue

In anticipation of possible customer questions raised by the film as to whether Rodriguez is properly compensated for this album, the back cover has the statement, "Rodriguez receives royalties from the sale of this release."

== Charts ==
=== Weekly charts ===
Chart (2012–2014)	Peak position
Australian Albums (ARIA)	17
Austrian Albums (Ö3 Austria)	65
Belgian Albums (Ultratop Flanders)	28
Belgian Albums (Ultratop Wallonia)	128
Danish Albums (Hitlisten)	2
Dutch Albums (Album Top 100)	32
Finnish Albums (Suomen virallinen lista)	34
French Albums (SNEP)	28
Italian Albums (FIMI)	48
New Zealand Albums (RMNZ)	9
Norwegian Albums (VG-lista)	22
Polish Albums (ZPAV)	3
South African Albums (RISA)	4
Spanish Albums (Promusicae)	7
Swedish Albums (Sverigetopplistan)	1
Swiss Albums (Schweizer Hitparade)	22
UK Albums (OCC)	26
US Billboard 200	76
US Americana/Folk Albums (Billboard)	5
US Heatseekers Albums (Billboard)	1
US Top Rock Albums (Billboard)	28

=== Year-end charts ===
Chart (2012)	Position
Swedish Albums (Sverigetopplistan)	77

Chart (2013)	Position
Belgian Albums (Ultratop Flanders)	165
French Albums (SNEP)	93
Swedish Albums (Sverigetopplistan)	13

Chart (2014)	Position
Belgian Albums (Ultratop Flanders)	69

== Certifications ==
Region	Certification	Certified units/sales
Australia (ARIA)	Gold	35,000^{^}
France (SNEP)	Gold	50,000^{*}
Netherlands (NVPI)	Gold	25,000^{‡}
New Zealand (RMNZ)	Gold	7,500^{^}
Poland (ZPAV)	Platinum	20,000^{*}
Sweden (GLF)	Platinum	40,000^{‡}
United Kingdom (BPI)	Gold	100,000^{‡}
^{*} Sales figures based on certification alone.^{^} Shipments figures based on certification alone.^{‡} Sales+streaming figures based on certification alone.
