= I Believe in Music =

I Believe in Music may refer to:

- "I Believe in Music" (song), a 1970 song by Mac Davis and 1972 hit by Gallery
- I Believe in Music (album), a 1970 album by Mac Davis
- I Believe in Music (Louis Jordan album), 1973
