= Rodriguez at His Best =

At His Best

Greatest hits album by Rodriguez
- Released: June 1977
- Recorded: 1970–1971, 1976
- Genre: Rock
- Length: 40:10
- Label: Blue Goose/RCA (Australia)

Rodriguez chronology
| Coming from Reality (1971) | At His Best (1977) |

Professional ratings
Review scores
| Source | Rating |
|---|---|
| AllMusic | 3.5/5 stars |

At His Best is a compilation album by American singer/song writer, Rodriguez. It was originally released exclusively in Australia by the Australian record label Blue Goose Music in 1977. Unbeknownst at the time even to Rodriguez himself, bootleg copies of the album subsequently went platinum in South Africa in the late 1970s.

The tracks "Can't Get Away", "I'll Slip Away", and "Street Boy" were originally recorded for his unfinished third studio album; these three were later included as bonus tracks on the 2009 U.S. re-issue of his second studio album, Coming from Reality.

== Track listing ==
1. "Crucify Your Mind" – 2:28 (from Cold Fact)
2. "Sugar Man" – 3:45 (from Cold Fact)
3. "Sandrevan Lullaby" – 6:35 (from Coming from Reality)
4. "Inner City Blues" – 3:23 (from Cold Fact)
5. "Can't Get Away" – 3:53 (previously unreleased)
6. "I Wonder" – 2:30 (from Cold Fact)
7. "I'll Slip Away" – 2:50 (re-recording of his 1967 single)
8. "Street Boy" – 3:43 (previously unreleased)
9. "Cause" – 5:24 (from Coming from Reality)
10. "Jane S Piddy" – 2:51 (from Cold Fact)
11. "Establishment Blues" – 2:04 (from Cold Fact)
