= Nice to Be with You (album) =

Studio album by Gallery
- Released: 1972
- Recorded: 1971
- Studio: Bell Sound (New York City)
- Genres: Pop rock, soft rock
- Label: Sussex Records
- Producers: Mike Theodore and Dennis Coffey

Gallery chronology
Nice to Be with You (1972)	Gallery featuring Jim Gold (1972)

Singles from Nice to Be with You
- 1. "You're Always on My Mind" Released: 1972 (Barbados only); 2. "Nice to Be with You" Released: 1972; 3. "I Believe in Music" Released: 1972; 4. "Big City Miss Ruth Ann" Released: 1972

Nice to Be with You is the debut album by Gallery, released in 1972 on Sussex Records.

The album peaked at No. 75 on the Billboard 200, making it the band's only album to chart. Three of its singles entered the top 40 on both the Hot 100 and Adult Contemporary charts, with the song of the same name as the band's biggest hit.

== Track listing ==
All tracks written by Jim Gold, except where noted.

Side A
No.	Title	Writer(s)	Length
1.	"There's an Island"	Meshel, Welch, Gilutin	2:45
2.	"Louisiana Line"		2:42
3.	"Someone"		3:35
4.	"Ginger Haired Man"		2:45
5.	"Nice to Be with You"		2:37
6.	"Gee Whiz"	Jeanne J. Thomas	2:40

Side B
No.	Title	Writer(s)	Length
7.	"I Believe in Music"	Mac Davis	2:26
8.	"Lover's Hideaway"		2:40
9.	"You're Always on My Mind"		3:00
10.	"He Will Break Your Heart"	Carter, Mayfield, Butler	3:00
11.	"Sunday and Me"	Neil Diamond	2:35
12.	"Big City Miss Ruth Ann"	Lazaros	2:34

== Personnel ==
Gallery

- Jim Gold – lead vocals, guitar
- Danny Brucato – drums
- Brent Anderson – backing vocals, guitar
- Dennis Kovarik – bass, backing vocals
- Bill Nova – backing vocals, guitar, percussion
- Cal Freeman – guitar
- Paul Franklin – steel guitar

Production

- Producer: Dennis Coffey, Mike Theodore
- Engineer: Milan Bogden
- Photography: Ransier & Anderson

== Charts ==
Album

Year	Chart	Position
1972	Billboard Top LPs	75
1972	Australia (Kent Music Report)	75

Singles

Year	Single	Chart	Position
1972	"Nice to Be with You"	US Billboard Hot 100	4
1972	"Nice to Be with You"	US Billboard Easy Listening	5
1972	"Nice to Be with You"	Australia	4
1972	"Nice to Be with You"	Canada RPM Top Singles	1
1972	"I Believe in Music"	US Billboard Hot 100	22
1972	"I Believe in Music"	US Billboard Easy Listening	12
1972	"I Believe in Music"	Australia	62
1972	"I Believe in Music"	Canada RPM Top Singles	5
1973	"Big City Miss Ruth Ann"	US Billboard Hot 100	23
1973	"Big City Miss Ruth Ann"	US Billboard Easy Listening	10
1973	"Big City Miss Ruth Ann"	Australia	91
