= Yolanda Be Cool =

Australian electronic music duo

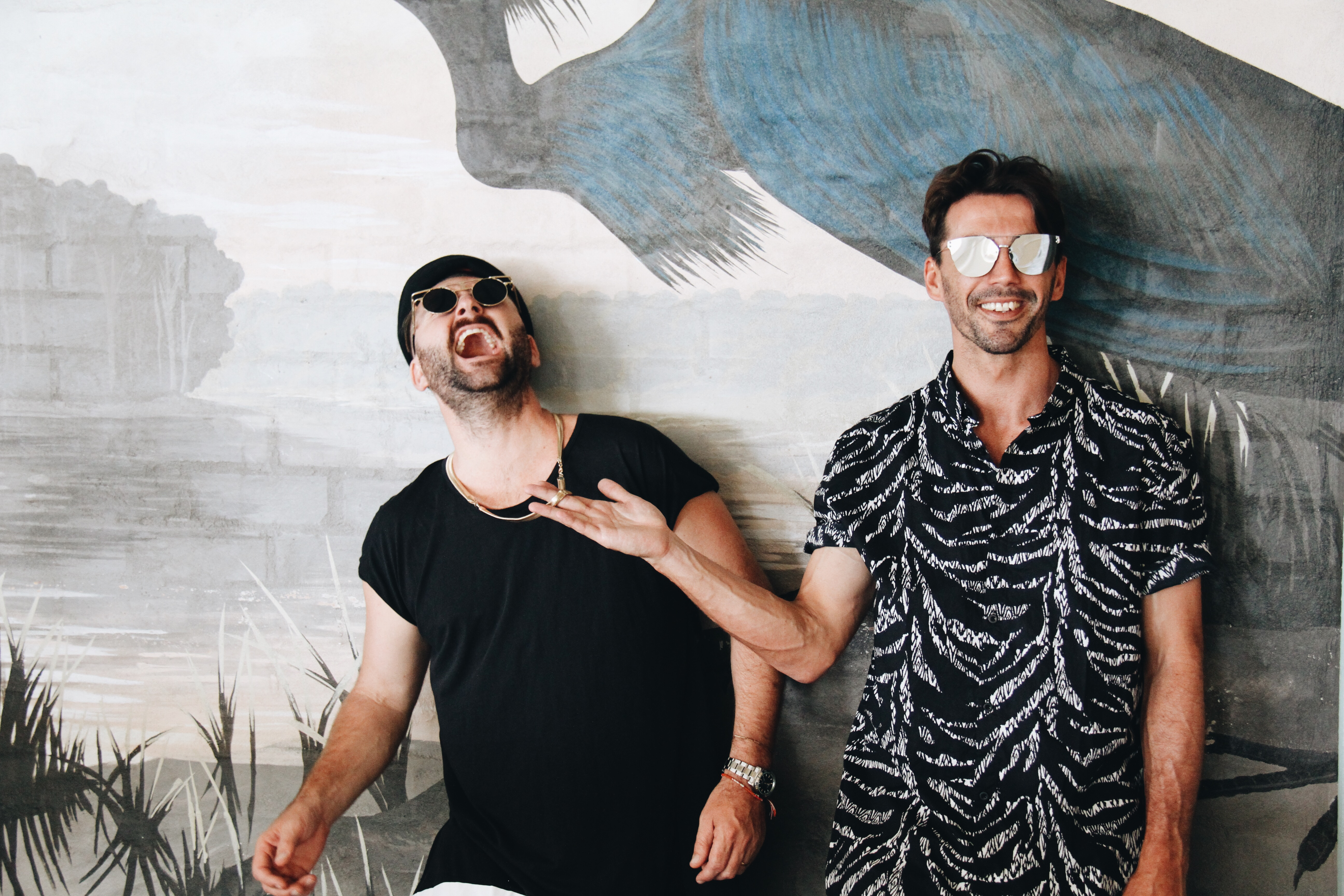

Background information
- Origin: Australia
- Genres: Nu-disco; electro swing; house
- Years active: 2009–present
- Labels: Ultra; Sweat It Out
- Members: Andrew Stanley; Matthew Handley

Yolanda Be Cool are an Australian music duo made up of Andrew Stanley and Matthew Handley.

== History ==
In 2010, they collaborated with Australian producer DCUP (real name Duncan MacLennan) to release an international single "We No Speak Americano" on the indie Australian label Sweat It Out, sampling a 1956 Neapolitan language hit "Tu vuò fà l'americano" by Renato Carosone and written by Carosone and Nicola "Nisa" Salerno.

"We No Speak Americano" sold over 5 million copies and amassed over 200 million YouTube views worldwide. It topped the British, Spanish, German, Mexican, Argentinian, Swedish, Danish, Swiss, and Ecuadorian charts, and reached the Top 5 in Australia, France, Italy, Spain and Norway. It was also a chart hit in Colombia, New Zealand, Mexico, Peru, Dominican Republic, Ecuador, Venezuela, Honduras, Costa Rica and several other countries. The video was directed by Andy Hylton. Prior to the hit, they had collaborated with DCUP when he remixed their hit "Afro Nuts" in 2009.

The name is a reference to the scene in the film Pulp Fiction, where the character Jules (played by Samuel L. Jackson) tells an armed robber named Yolanda (played by Amanda Plummer) "Be cool!" Yolanda Be Cool received two 2010 ARIA Music Awards nominations which include, "Best Dance Release" and "Most Popular Australian Single" for "We No Speak Americano".

In 2011, Yolanda Be Cool collaborated with Crystal Waters on a track called 'Le Bump' which then made it onto their debut album "Ladies and Mentalmen" released by Sweat It Out! and DIM MAK in 2013. The album featured indigenous Australian icon Gurrumul, house royalty Crystal Waters and Barbara Tucker, soul legend Betty Wright and US up and coming rap star Nola Darling. Also, Yolanda Be Cool notably remixed Cyndi Lauper's song "Girls Just Want to Have Fun", taken from the 30th anniversary reissue of her album She's So Unusual.

In 2015, they got back in the studio with DCUP to make "Sugar Man", an edit of a song by Rodriguez that went on to go platinum in Australia before writing Soul Makossa, which samples Manu Dibango's saxophone. The song currently has over 1 million plays on YouTube and claimed number 2 on Beatport's Top Ten in addition to being the sixth most sold House record of the year.

Yolanda Be Cool released "From Me to You" with DCUP on Spinnin' Records on 8 February 2016.

== Discography ==
=== Studio albums ===
List of studio albums
Title	Album details
Ladies & Mentalmen	Released: 7 December 2012; Label: Sweat It Out; Format: CD, digital download
Je Suis Music	Released: 26 August 2016; Label: Sweat It Out; Format: Digital download

=== Charted Singles ===
==== As lead artist ====
List of charted singles as lead artist, with selected chart positions and certifications, showing year released and album name
Title	Year	Peak chart positions										Certifications	Album
Title	Year	AUS	AUT	BEL	FRA	GER	NLD	SWE	SWI	UK	US	Certifications	Album
"We No Speak Americano" (with DCUP)	2010	4	1	1	2	1	1	1	1	1	29	ARIA: 2× Platinum; BPI: Platinum; BVMI: 2× Platinum; IFPI AUT: Platinum; IFPI DEN: Platinum; IFPI SWI: Platinum; RIAA: Platinum; RMNZ: Platinum	Non-album singles
"Sugar Man" (with DCUP)	2014	15	—	—	—	—	—	—	—	—	—	ARIA: Platinum	Non-album singles
"Soul Makossa (Money)" (with DCUP)	2015	–	–	11	—	—	—	—	—	—	—		Non-album singles
"—" denotes a recording that did not chart or was not released in that territory.

== Awards ==
=== AIR Awards ===
The Australian Independent Record Awards (commonly known informally as AIR Awards) is an annual awards night to recognise, promote and celebrate the success of Australia's Independent Music sector.

Year	Nominee / work	Award	Result
2013	Ladies & Mentalmen	Best Independent Dance/Electronic Album	Nominated
