= Ralph Graham =

Ralph Graham may refer to:

- Ralph Graham (American football)
- Ralph Graham (singer)
