= Clarence Avant =

American music executive and film producer (1931–2023)

Background information
- Born: Clarence Alexander Avant; February 25, 1931; Climax, North Carolina, U.S.
- Died: August 13, 2023 (aged 92) Los Angeles, California, U.S.
- Genres: R&B; soul; pop
- Occupations: Music executive; businessman; film producer
- Labels: Venture Records Inc. Sussex Records; Tabu Records; Motown Records
- Formerly of: Gallery; The SOS Band; Jimmy Jam and Terry Lewis; Sixto Rodriguez
- Spouse: Jacqueline Alberta Gray (m. 1967; died 2021)

Clarence Alexander Avant (February 25, 1931 – August 13, 2023) was a prominent American music executive, businessman and film producer. Widely recognized as "The Black Godfather", Avant's career was characterized by his advocacy for equitable treatment and compensation for African American artists in the entertainment industry. His efforts were acknowledged with his 2021 induction into the Rock and Roll Hall of Fame.

Originating from Climax, North Carolina, Avant began his professional journey in the 1950s, managing Teddy P's Lounge in Newark, New Jersey. Under the guidance of Joe Glaser, a notable music manager of the era, Avant managed a diverse portfolio of artists, ranging from R&B talents like Little Willie John to jazz figures such as Jimmy Smith. In the 1960s, he founded Avant Garde Enterprises, marking a significant step in his contributions to the music sector.

Avant was instrumental in the formation and oversight of several record labels, including Venture Records Inc. and Sussex Records. Additionally, he expanded his professional reach into broadcasting by acquiring KTYM-FM, distinguished as the first African-American owned FM radio station in metropolitan Los Angeles. Avant's business acumen was further demonstrated when he played a role in the sale of Stax Records to Gulf+Western.

== Biography ==
=== Early career ===
Clarence Alexander Avant was born in Climax, North Carolina, on February 25, 1931; he was the oldest of eight children. He attended a one-room school in Greensboro, North Carolina until the eighth grade. He spent his freshman and second years of high school at Dudley High School in Greensboro before moving to New Jersey in 1947 as a teenager. In New Jersey, Avant worked as a stock clerk at Macy's and for a law directory. He began in the music business in the 1950s as a manager of Teddy P's Lounge in Newark, New Jersey, owned by promoter Teddy Powell.

Joe Glaser, music manager of Louis Armstrong from 1935 until Glaser’s death in 1969, and the original proprietor of Sunset Gardens on the South Side of Chicago, mentored Avant. Glaser founded Consolidated Booking Corporation and Associated Booking Corporation on November 26, 1943.

Avant later managed R&B singer Little Willie John, jazz singers Sarah Vaughan, Kim Weston, Luiz Bonfa, Wynton Kelly, Freddie Hubbard, Curtis Fuller, Pat Thomas, rock and roll pioneer Tom Wilson, whom Avant partnered with in the Wilson Organization, jazz producer Creed Taylor, jazz musician Jimmy Smith and Argentine pianist-composer, Lalo Schifrin. Avant incorporated Avant Garde Enterprises, Inc. on November 7, 1962, in New York, the same month that Smith became a client of Associated Booking, and originally had offices at 850 Seventh Avenue. Schifrin and Smith collaborated to make The Cat, released by Verve Records in 1964. Avant opened a West Coast office in September 1964 to accommodate the growing motion picture soundtrack assignments offered to his clients. During his years in New York, Avant served as an adviser, board member, and executive of the National Association of Radio Announcers (NARA), later the National Association of Television and Radio Announcers (NATRA), and also as a consultant to PlayTape, a two track tape cartridge system developed by Frank Stanton, and first marketed by MGM Records. On September 27, 1966, Avant incorporated Sussex Productions, Inc. in New York, an independent record production firm with artists Four Hi's, Johnny Nash, Terry Bryant, Billy Woods, and the Judge and the Jury.

=== Venture Records Inc. ===
Venture Records Inc., a company for which Avant successfully engineered the first joint venture between an African American artist and a major record company, was incorporated in California in 1967. Founded as an outlet for the soul acts of MGM Records, Venture Records Inc. was run by former Motown songwriter, record producer, and A&R department head William "Mickey" Stevenson. Negotiated for Stevenson by Los Angeles attorney Abraham Somer, the label had offices at 8350 Wilshire Boulevard in Beverly Hills.

Avant moved from Manhattan to Beverly Hills to work with Venture Records Inc. in the Fall of 1967, doing so until 1969 when MGM Records shut down the label and joint venture. During this time, record producer, songwriter, and executive Al Bell enlisted the aid of Avant, whom he had met through the National Association of Television and Radio Announcers (NATRA), to sell Stax Records to Gulf+Western. The deal was finalized on May 29, 1968, for $4.3 million, with Avant receiving ten percent of all debentures.

In August 1969, Avant became the associate producer, along with Al Bell, of Douglas Turner Ward's The Reckoning (a surreal Southern Fable), presented in co-operation with The Negro Ensemble Company at St. Mark's Playhouse in New York. The Reckoning started the off-Broadway season, starring Jeannette DuBois, later Ja'net Dubois of Good Times fame.

=== Sussex Records Inc. ===
After Venture Records Inc. folded, Avant remained in Los Angeles and founded Sussex Records in 1969. The company went out of business in June 1975, with the IRS seizing and auctioning off all assets because of $48,000 in federal tax liens.

The remaining furniture, office equipment, and recording masters (bought by CBS Records for $50,500) were auctioned in July 1975 at Sussex offices (6255 West Sunset Blvd, Hollywood). Avant signed singer, songwriter, and producer Bill Withers, guitarist Dennis Coffey, and soft rock band Gallery to Sussex Records, which was distributed from 1970 to 1974 by Buddah Records.

Sussex Records is mentioned in the documentary Searching for Sugar Man. Interviewees in the documentary said in their interviews that they paid royalties from sales of Sixto Rodriguez' records to Sussex Records. It is strongly implied in the documentary that Rodriguez had been cheated out of the royalties.

43 North Broadway, LLC currently manages the Sussex catalog.

=== Avant Garde Broadcasting ===
Under Avant Garde Broadcasting, Inc., founded on August 6, 1971, Avant bought the first African-American owned FM radio station in metropolitan Los Angeles on March 3, 1973, from Trans America Broadcasting Corp, buying the license of KTYM-FM in Inglewood, California for $321,000, including actual facilities at 6803 West Boulevard in Inglewood, and FCC licensing fees, renaming it KAGB-FM.

Using a $199,900 promissory note and stock purchase warrants from the Urban National Corporation of Boston, Massachusetts (a Venture Capital company founded in July 1971), Avant partnered with two investment bankers.

Del Shields from the National Association of Radio and Television Announcers served as Executive Vice-president.

Management refused to accept all counsel or advice on how to run the station, despite never turning a profit. Ultimately, AVG was forced into bankruptcy by Urban National on November 20, 1975, when it defaulted on promissory notes and warrants of around $400,000. Avant lost about $611,168.67 in the bankruptcy, $71,500 from Interior Music Corporation advances between August 1973 and September 1974, and $13,887 from Sussex Records loans. Comedian Bill Cosby was an additional investor in Avant Garde Broadcasting, investing approx. $200,000 through his company SAH Enterprises.

=== Save the Children ===
In September 1973, Paramount Pictures released Save the Children, with Avant serving as executive producer. Filmed at the Operation PUSH Black Expo in Chicago, the production mixed performances of top black entertainers with footage depicting blacks, especially children, in various conditions, including war-ravaged and malnourished refugees. The film premiered at the Apollo Theater in Harlem.

== Awards ==
On May 23, 1998, Avant received the Golden Plate Award from the American Academy of Achievement, presented by Awards Council member Quincy Jones.

On February 10, 2008, the National Association of Recording Arts and Sciences awarded him the Trustees Award.

On October 7, 2016, Avant received a star on the Hollywood Walk of Fame for his contributions in the recording industry, located at 6363 Hollywood Boulevard, next to Jimmy Jam and Terry Lewis' star.

In February 2018, Avant received the President's Merit Award as a Grammy Icon at the Clive Davis Pre Grammy Gala in Los Angeles.

On May 12, 2021, the Rock and Roll Hall of Fame announced that Avant received the Ahmet Ertegun award and will be inducted to the 2021 class. Previous inductee Bill Withers, as well as Vice President Kamala Harris and former President Barack Obama spoke about Avant's impact in a video package.

== Personal life ==
In 1967, Avant married Jacqueline "Jackie" Alberta Gray. The couple had two children; Nicole and Alexander. Nicole Avant is a former United States Ambassador to the Bahamas, and wife of Netflix executive Ted Sarandos, who produced the Netflix documentary The Black Godfather about her father's music industry career and his influential role advocating for Black artists and athletes.

Jackie Avant served as president of the Neighbors of Watts, the support group for the South Central Community Child Care Center in 1975, entertainment chairman of the NOW benefit auction and dinner dance, and chairwoman of NOW membership in 1974. She was also on the board of directors of the International Student Center at UCLA. She was shot and killed on December 1, 2021, at age 81, during a home invasion at the couple's residence in Beverly Hills, California.

Avant's 75th birthday was celebrated by Billboard in its February 2006 issue.

Clarence Avant died at his home in Los Angeles on August 13, 2023, at the age of 92.
