= Nice to Be with You =

Single by Gallery

from the album Nice to Be with You
- B-side: "Ginger Haired Man"
- Released: February 1972
- Recorded: 1971
- Genre: Soft rock
- Length: 2:37
- Label: Sussex Records
- Songwriter: Jim Gold
- Producers: Mike Theodore and Dennis Coffey

Gallery singles chronology
"Nice to Be with You" (1972)	"I Believe in Music" (1972)

"Nice to Be with You" is a 1972 song, from the album of the same name, by Gallery.

== Background ==
On Dick Clark's American Bandstand of February 26, 1972, "Nice to Be with You" - which had just debuted on that day on the Hot 100 - received a "lousy" average of 57.5, on a scale from 35 to 98, on the "Rate-a-Record" segment of the show. Nevertheless, the group performed the song on the May 13, 1972 American Bandstand.

== Chart performance ==
It became an international top 5 hit, reaching No. 4 on the Hot 100 and No. 1 on Cashbox, WCFL, and WLS. It also reached No. 1 in Canada. The song reached No. 4 in Australia and No. 2 in New Zealand.

== Charts ==
=== Weekly charts ===
Chart (1972)	Peak position
Australia (Kent Music Report)	4
Canadian RPM Top 100 Singles	1
New Zealand (Listener)	2
South Africa (Springbok Radio)	3
US Billboard Hot 100	4
US Adult Contemporary (Billboard)	5
US Cash Box Top 100	1

=== Year-end charts ===
Chart (1972)	Rank
Australia	40
Canada	36
US Billboard Hot 100	14
US Cash Box Top 100	15

== See also ==
- List of Cash Box Top 100 number-one singles of 1972
