= I Believe in Music (album) =

Album by Mac Davis

Studio album by Mac Davis
- Released: 1971
- Recorded: December 1970 – March 1971
- Studios: The Record Plant, Los Angeles, California
- Genres: Country, pop
- Length: 32:45
- Label: Columbia
- Producers: The Tokens, Dave Appell

Mac Davis chronology
Song Painter (1970)	I Believe in Music (1971)	Baby, Don't Get Hooked on Me (1972)

I Believe in Music is the second album released by singer-songwriter and actor Mac Davis. It was released in 1971, although the title song had already charted in 1970. The title track went on to become a standard and was covered by many artists in the 1970s, including a top 30 pop hit by Gallery in 1972.

Music reviewer Stephen Thomas Erlewine considered many of the songs to be more suitable for the album than on radio, and said:

The next time around, Davis would give himself his big, splashy original tune "Baby Don’t Get Hooked on Me", thereby finally hitting the big time, but here he’s still finding his voice as a recording artist. He’s almost there, but the results are most interesting in how his versions of his older songs point the way at what was to come".

The title song became Davis's signature song. His hit "Baby Don't Get Hooked On Me" was released after this album debuted, later in 1972.

== Track listing ==
All tracks are written by Mac Davis, except where noted.

No.	Title	Writer(s)	Length
1.	"I Believe in Music"		3:36
2.	"Hollywood Humpty Dumpty"		3:29
3.	"A Little Less Conversation"	Mac Davis, Billy Strange	2:20
4.	"In The Eyes of My People"		3:43
5.	"Watching Scotty Grow"		3:10
6.	"Yesterday and You"	Mac Davis, Larry Collins	2:43
7.	"Christmas Carol"		2:22
8.	"Sarah Between the Lines"		2:48
9.	"Something's Burning"		3:59
10.	"Poem for My Little Lady"		3:01
11.	"I Believe in Music (reprise)"		1:34

== Personnel ==
- Mac Davis - guitar, vocals
- Al Kooper - electric guitar
- Sal DiTroia - acoustic guitar
- Dave Appell, Mitch Margo - rhythm guitar
- Eric Weissberg - steel guitar
- Kirk Hamilton - bass guitar
- Mitch Margo, Ron Frangipane - keyboards
- Hank Medress, Mitch Margo, Phil Margo - drums, percussion
- New York Horns and Strings - orchestra
- Jay Siegel Singers, Cissy Houston Singers - chorus
- Ron Frangipane - "sweetening" arrangements

Technical

- Pete Weiss - engineer, mixing
- Guy Webster - photography

== Charts ==
Album

Year	Chart	Peak position
1971	Top LP's (Billboard)	160

Singles

Year	Single	Chart	Peak position
1971	I Believe In Music	Pop Singles	117
1971	I Believe In Music	Easy Listening	25
