= DCUP =

Australian electronic music producer

- Born: Duncan MacLennan; Australia
- Genres: House; alternative dance; electro swing
- Occupations: Record producer; DJ; remixer
- Instruments: Turntable; sampler
- Years active: 2009–present
- Label: Sweat It Out
- Website: DCUP on Myspace

Duncan MacLennan, better known by his stage name DCUP (pronounced "D-cup"), is an Australian record producer, DJ, and remixer. He is best known for his collaboration with fellow Australian band Yolanda Be Cool on their international hit single "We No Speak Americano" (2010), which samples Renato Carosone. He released an EP called Style EP in 2009 and between then and 2015, released a number of other collaborations and remixes, including songs by Art vs. Science and Jessica Mauboy.

== Early life ==
Duncan MacLennan was born in Australia.

== Career ==
MacLennan is known by his stage name DCUP. He produces mainly funk and disco style music.

DCUP collaborated with Australian band Yolanda Be Cool in 2009 when he remixed their hit "Afro Nuts". He again collaborated with them on their international hit single "We No Speak Americano", released in February 2010 on the Australian indie label Sweat It Out. The song samples the 1956 hit "Tu Vuò Fà L'Americano", sung by Renato Carosone and written by Carosone and Nicola Salerno. The song topped the British, Irish, and Danish charts, and reached the Top 5 in Australia, Netherlands, Spain, Sweden, and Norway. It was also a chart hit in Italy, Belgium, and New Zealand.

In 2013, DCUP released "Don't Be Shy" remix, feat. Mereki. A music video to accompany the track, directed and executive produced by Australian director Tim White and starring Japanese fashion model Kozue Akimoto, was released to accompany the single.

== Discography ==
=== Extended plays ===
List of extended plays
Title	Album details
Style EP	Released: 22 June 2009; Label: Sweat It Out; Formats: Digital download

=== Singles ===
==== As lead artist ====
List of singles as lead artist, with selected chart positions and certifications, showing year released and album name
Title	Year	Peak chart positions										Certifications	Album
Title	Year	AUS	AUT	CAN	DEN	FRA	GER	NZ	SWI	UK	US	Certifications	Album
"We No Speak Americano" (with Yolanda Be Cool)	2010	4	1	16	1	2	1	2	1	1	29	ARIA: 2× Platinum; BPI: Platinum; BEA: Platinum; BVMI: 2× Platinum; FMI: Platinum; GLF: 6 x Platinum; PROMUSICAE: 3 x Platinum; IFPI AUT: Platinum; IFPI DEN: Platinum; IFPI SWI: Platinum; RIAA: Platinum; RMNZ: Platinum	Non-album singles
"Sugar Man" (with Yolanda Be Cool)	2014	15	—	—	—	—	—	—	—	—	—	ARIA: Platinum	Non-album singles
"Soul Makossa (Money)" (with Yolanda Be Cool)	2015	86	—	—	—	—	—	—	—	—	—		Non-album singles
"—" denotes a recording that did not chart or was not released in that territory.

== Remixes ==
2009

- Yolanda Be Cool – "Afro Nuts" (DCUP Remix)
- Killa Kela – "Everyday" (DCUP Remix)
- Act Yo Age featuring Drop The Lime – "Night of the Hornheadz" (DCUP Remix)
- Pablo Calamari – "Think About You" (DCUP Remix)
- KillaQueenz – "Boyfriend" (DCUP Remix)

2010

- Alesha – "Drummer Boy" (Yolanda Be Cool & DCUP Remix)
- Cicada – "Your Love" (DCUP Remix)
- Jazzbit – "Sing Sing Sing" (Yolanda Be Cool & DCUP Remix)
- Grum – "Can't Shake This Feeling" (DCUP Remix)
- Denzal Park – "Filter Freak" (DCUP Remix)
- Phonat – "When Love Hits The Fan" (DCUP Remix)
- Art vs. Science – "Magic Fountain" (DCUP Remix)

2011

- Toute Freak – "Neighbour" (DCUP Remix)
- Jessica Mauboy – "Saturday Night" (DCUP Remix)
- So Called Friend featuring Marc Deal – "Near Impossible" (DCUP Remix)

2012

- Peking Duk – "The Way You Are" (DCUP Remix)
- Grant Smillie Walden featuring Zoe Badwi – "A Million Lights" (DCUP Remix)
- P-Money and Dan Aux – "Kinda Lovin" (DCUP Remix)

2013

- Estate – "Slipstream" (DCUP Remix)
- "Don't Be Shy", feat. Mereki

2014

- "Sugar Man" (DCUP Remix)

2015

- "Soul Makossa (Money)" (DCUP Remix)
