= Coming from Reality =

Studio album by Rodriguez
- Released: November 1971
- Recorded: 1970
- Studios: Lansdowne Studios, London
- Genres: Folk rock; psychedelic rock
- Length: 40:30
- Label: Sussex
- Producer: Steve Rowland

Rodriguez chronology
Cold Fact (1970)	Coming from Reality (1971)	At His Best (1977)

Professional ratings
Review scores
Source	Rating
AllMusic	3.5/5 stars
Laut.de	4/5 stars
MusicOMH	3/5 stars
Pitchfork	6.1/10
PopMatters	6/10

Coming from Reality is the second and final studio album from American singer–songwriter Rodriguez, originally released by Sussex Records in 1971. It was later released in South Africa in 1976 with the alternate title After the Fact.

The album was also reissued on compact disc (CD) by Light in the Attic Records in May 2009. This reissue included three bonus tracks originally released only in Australia, although they were recorded in Detroit in 1972 with Cold Fact collaborators Mike Theodore and Dennis Coffey, representing the last recordings they ever did together.

== Track listing ==
All songs written by Sixto Rodriguez.

No.	Title	Length
1.	"Climb Up on My Music"	4:54
2.	"A Most Disgusting Song"	4:49
3.	"I Think of You"	3:25
4.	"Heikki's Suburbia Bus Tour"	3:22
5.	"Silver Words?"	2:04
6.	"Sandrevan Lullaby – Lifestyles"	6:37
7.	"To Whom It May Concern"	3:21
8.	"It Started Out So Nice"	4:01
9.	"Halfway Up the Stairs"	2:27
10.	"Cause"	5:30

2009 re-release bonus tracks
No.	Title	Length
11.	"Can't Get Away"	3:57
12.	"Street Boy"	3:47
13.	"I'll Slip Away"	2:53

== Personnel ==
Credits adapted from the 2009 CD reissue liner notes.

- Rodriguez – vocals, guitar
- Chris Spedding – guitars
- Tony Carr – bongos, possible percussion
- Phil Dennys – keyboards
- Jimmy Horowitz – violin (track 6)
- Gary Taylor – bass
- Andrew Steele – drums

=== Technical ===
- Steve Rowland – producer
- John Mackswith – engineer
- Phil Dennys – arrangement (tracks 3, 5, 7 and 9)
- Jimmy Horowitz – arrangement (tracks 6, 8 and 10)

=== Artwork ===
- Hal Wilson – photography and illustration
- Rainy M. Moore – album title, creative coordinator
- Milton Sincoff – packaging and merchandising
- Clarence Avant – impresario

== Releases ==
- Coming from Reality LP (Sussex, 1971)
- Coming from Reality CD (Light in the Attic Records, 2009)
- Coming from Reality LP with bonus tracks (Light in the Attic Records, 2009)
- Coming from Reality LP with bonus tracks (Light in the Attic Records, 2009)
- Coming from Reality LP, remastered (Sussex/UMe/Universal, 2019)

== Charts ==
Chart (1979)	Peak position
Australian Albums (Kent Music Report)	24
Chart (2013)	Peak position
Belgian Albums (Ultratop Flanders)	109
Danish Albums (Hitlisten)	12
Dutch Albums (Album Top 100)	91
Finnish Albums (Suomen virallinen lista)	29
French Albums (SNEP)	135
Spanish Albums (Promusicae)	63
Swedish Albums (Sverigetopplistan)	16
Chart (2013)	Peak position
Australian Albums (ARIA)	67
Chart (2014)	Peak position
Australian Albums (ARIA)	25
UK Albums (Official Charts)	73
