= Song Painter =

Studio album by Mac Davis
- Released: May 10, 1970
- Recorded: January – April 1970
- Studios: Ardent Studios, Memphis, Tennessee
- Genres: Country; Pop
- Length: 39:12
- Label: Columbia
- Producers: Jimmy Bowen, Jerry Fuller

Mac Davis chronology
Song Painter (1970)	I Believe in Music (1971)

Alternative cover
- Reissue cover

Song Painter is the debut album by singer-songwriter and actor Mac Davis, released in 1970. It was arranged and conducted by Artie Butler. The tracks "Whoever Finds This, I Love You" and "Half and Half" (the latter with the subtitle "Song for Sarah") would later reappear on Davis' 1972 album Baby Don't Get Hooked on Me. Artie Butler was credited for arrangements and conducting.

== Track list ==
All tracks written by Mac Davis, except where noted.

=== United States issue ===
No.	Title	Writer(s)	Length
1.	"Whoever Finds This, I Love You"		4:30
2.	"Babies' Butts – Part I"		0:25
3.	"Memories"	Billy Strange	3:49
4.	"Babies' Butts – Part II"		0:25
5.	"Daddy's Little Man"		3:29
6.	"Ever Since I Met You Babe – Part I"		0:26
7.	"Home"	Larry Collins	3:49
8.	"Ever Since I Met You Babe – Part II"		0:27
9.	"Closest I Ever Came"		2:47
10.	"You're Good for Me"	Larry Collins	3:14
11.	"Contributing to My Delinquency – Part I"		0:23
12.	"In the Ghetto"		2:43
13.	"Contributing to My Delinquency – Part II"		0:27
14.	"Hello L.A., Bye Bye Birmingham"	Delaney Bramlett	2:47
15.	"Hambone"		0:24
16.	"Uncle Boogar Red and Byrdie Nelle"	Larry Collins	3:09
17.	"Ever Since I Met You Babe – Part III"		0:22
18.	"Once You Get Used to It"		2:46
19.	"Contributing to My Delinquency – Part III"		0:21
20.	"Half and Half"		2:53

=== Canadian issue ===
No.	Title	Length
1.	"Whoever Finds This, I Love You"	4:30
2.	"Hambone"	0:24
3.	"Uncle Boogar Red And Byrdie Nelle"	3:09
4.	"Contributing to mMy Delinquency – Part I"	0:23
5.	"In The Ghetto"	2:43
6.	"Babies' Butts – Part I"	0:25
7.	"Memories"	3:49
8.	"Contributing to My Delinquency – Part II"	0:27
9.	"Hello L.A., Bye Bye Birmingham"	2:47
10.	"Daddy's Little Man"	3:29
11.	"Babies' Butts – Part II"	0:25
12.	"Once You Get Used To It"	2:46
13.	"Ever Since I Met You Babe – Part I"	0:26
14.	"You're Good For Me"	3:14
15.	"Ever Since I Met You Babe – Part II"	0:20
16.	"Home"	3:23
17.	"Ever Since I Met You Babe – Part III"	0:22
18.	"Closest I Ever Came"	2:55
19.	"Contributing to My Delinquency – Part III"	0:21
20.	"Half and Half"	2:53

== Charts ==
Album

Year	Chart	Position
1970	Top Country LP's (Billboard)	35
1970	Top LPs (Billboard)	182

Singles

Year	Single	Chart	Position
1970	Whoever Finds This, I Love You	Billboard Hot 100	53
1970	Whoever Finds This, I Love You	Hot Country Singles	43
