= I Believe in Music (song) =

1970 single by Mac Davis

Single by Mac Davis

from the album I Believe in Music
- B-side: "Hollywood Humpty Dumpty"
- Released: October 1970; August 31, 1971 (re-release)
- Recorded: 1970
- Genre: Pop
- Length: 3:13
- Label: Columbia
- Songwriter: Mac Davis
- Producers: The Tokens, Dave Appell

Mac Davis singles chronology
"Beginning to Feel the Pain" (1971)	"I Believe in Music" (1970)	"Baby Don't Get Hooked on Me" (1972)

"I Believe in Music"

Single by Gallery

from the album Nice to Be with You
- B-side: "Someone"
- Released: August 1972
- Recorded: 1971
- Genre: Soft rock
- Length: 2:26
- Label: Sussex Records
- Songwriter: Mac Davis

Gallery singles chronology
"Nice to Be with You" (1972)	"I Believe in Music" (1972)	"Big City Miss Ruth Ann" (1972)

"I Believe in Music" is a 1970 song written and recorded by Mac Davis and later included on his second album I Believe in Music. Gallery covered it in 1972 as the second of three singles off their Nice to Be with You album and the follow-up release to their title track.

Gallery's version reached #22 on the US Billboard Hot 100 and #13 on the US Cash Box Top 100. It hit #5 in Canada.

Mac Davis's original had been released as a single nearly two years earlier and made a minor dent in the pop charts (US #117). His effort achieved #25 on the Adult Contemporary chart. It later became his signature song and an iconic anthem of the early '70s.

== Inspiration ==
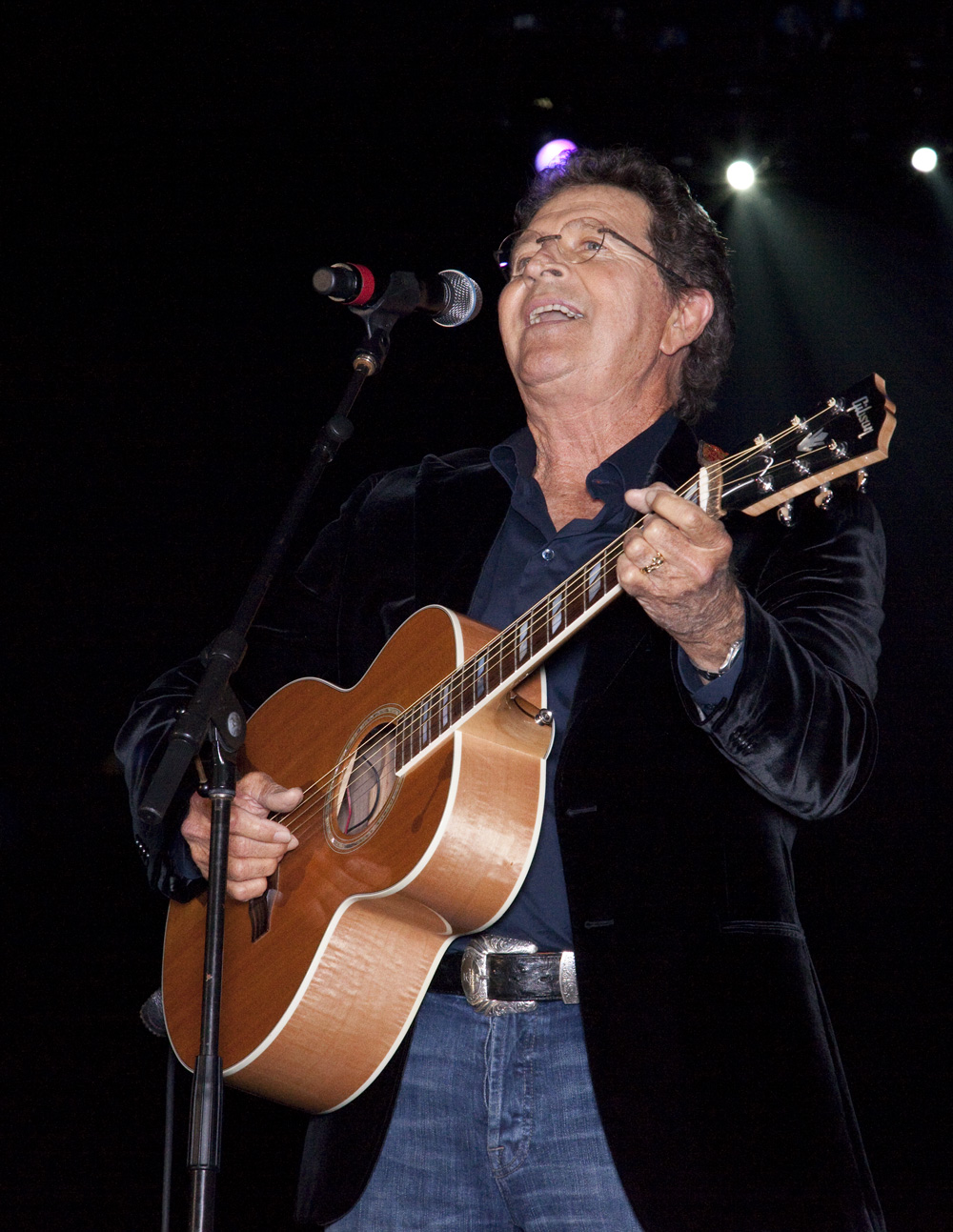
Davis in 2010. Davis said the line about lifting voices to the sky "epitomized the whole song. That's what music is about".

In a 2017 interview, Davis said the song was inspired while he was in England at the home of Lulu and Maurice Gibb, who were married at that time:

I went to the kitchen and fixed myself a drink at the party, and there were a bunch of hippie types and they were gonna have a séance. They asked me if I would like to join them. And I said, "No man, I don’t think so." (laughs). It wasn’t my thing. Then someone asked, "Don’t you believe in the occult?" I said, "No man, I believe in music." And the second I said it, I just went … "I believe in music". I looked around … it was like a God-shot. I saw one of Maurice Gibb’s guitars sitting on a stand, and I picked it up and started strumming it. I had the hook before I left there … (he sings) "I believe in music, I believe in love". Years later, "I Believe In Music" became my signature song. I closed every show with it.

Davis said he kept and framed the piece of paper from the hotel room where he completed the song. According to him, the line "Lift your voices to the sky, God loves you when you sing" was inspired by a piece of folk art he had seen that said, "God respects you when you work, but He loves you when you sing".

== Charts ==
=== Year-end charts ===
Mac Davis original

Chart (1970)	Peak position
US Billboard Bubbling Under the Hot 100	117
US Billboard Easy Listening	25

Marian Love cover

Chart (1971)	Peak position
US Billboard Bubbling Under the Hot 100	111
US Billboard Easy Listening	27

Gallery cover

Chart (1972)	Peak position
Canadian RPM Top Singles	5
US Billboard Hot 100	22
US Billboard Easy Listening	12
US Cash Box Top 100	13

Chart (1972)	Rank
US Billboard Top Easy Listening Singles	47

== Other cover versions ==
Helen Reddy's version was the first commercial recording of the song, and it was featured as the B-side of her first American success, "I Don't Know How to Love Him," which became a hit in February 1971. "I Believe in Music" has also been covered by Marian Love (#111, 1971; AC #27), Donny Hathaway, B.J. Thomas, Liza Minnelli, Perry Como, Louis Jordan, Lee Towers, Wayne Newton, Kenny Rogers, Glen Campbell, Lynn Anderson, Shirley Bassey, and The Statler Brothers.
