= Sugar Man (song) =

1970 song by Rodriguez

Single by Rodriguez

from the album Cold Fact
- A-side: "Sugar Man"
- B-side: "Inner City Blues"
- Released: 1970
- Recorded: August–September 1969
- Length: 3:45
- Label: Sussex
- Songwriter: Sixto Rodriguez
- Producers: Mike Theodore; Dennis Coffey

Rodriguez singles chronology
| "I'll Slip Away" (1967) | "Sugar Man" (1970) | "Inner City Blues" (1970) |

Audio sample
- file; help

"Sugar Man" is a song written and recorded by Sixto Rodriguez in August–September 1969 and released on his debut studio album, Cold Fact, in 1970.

The song was banned by the South African government in the 1970s because of drug references in the lyrics, with records scratched to prevent radio airplay.

== Covers ==
In 1998 the band Just Jinjer played the song in concert while supporting U2, and included a recording on their 2001 Greatest Hits album.

In 2013, during their first-ever shows in South Africa, the birthplace of lead singer Dave Matthews, Dave Matthews Band covered the song. They also included it on setlists throughout their 2014 Summer Tour. On June 21, 2022 at Pine Knob Music Theatre, Matthews met Rodriguez for the first time, and covered the song again in his honor.

== Samples ==
In 2001 Nas sampled the song in "You're Da Man" on his album Stillmatic.

== Remixes ==
=== David Holmes ===
In 2003 DJ and producer Holmes remixed the song for his album Come Get It I Got It.

=== Yolanda Be Cool & DCUP ===
"Sugar Man"

Single by Yolanda Be Cool and DCUP
- Released: 28 November 2014
- Length: 3:03
- Label: Sweat It Out; Warner Music Australia
- Songwriter: Sixto Rodriguez
- Producers: Yolanda Be Cool; DCUP

Yolanda Be Cool singles chronology
| "All That She Wants" (2014) | "Sugar Man" (2014) | "Soul Makossa (Money)" (2015) |

A remix of "Sugar Man" by Australian band Yolanda Be Cool and producer DCUP was released on 28 November 2014 by Australian independent label Sweat It Out. The song peaked at number 15 on the ARIA Charts and was certified platinum by the Australian Recording Industry Association for shipments exceeding 70,000 copies.

==== Background ====
Following the success of "We No Speak Americano" in 2010, Matt Handley and Andrew Stanley (Yolanda Be Cool), and Duncan Maclennan (DCUP) found themselves in huge demand, travelling the world performing. Handley said, "We always intended to do more tunes together, but we just never seemed to be able to be in the same room for long enough. Then Duncan moved to Melbourne and for a while, I guess we just did our own thing." Maclennan takes up the story, "As much as we wanted to do more tunes together, apart from finding the time, we also knew that finding a sample with the same magic as 'Americano' was a must. We didn't want to just put out tunes for the sake of it. Fast forward to now, and it just felt right to get back in the studio. We had been passing sample ideas back and forth for a while and we all just fell in love with 'Sugar Man'. It felt right."

==== Music video ====
A music video to accompany the release of "Sugar Man" was first released on YouTube on 25 November 2014 with a total length of three minutes and fourteen seconds.

==== Track listing ====
Digital download
| No. | Title | Length |
|---|---|---|
| 1. | "Sugar Man" (radio edit) | 3:03 |

Digital download — Remixes
| No. | Title | Length |
|---|---|---|
| 1. | "Sugar Man" (club mix) | 5:51 |
| 2. | "Sugar Man" (Vanilla Ace & Dharkfunkh Remix) | 6:51 |
| 3. | "Sugar Man" (Generik Remix) | 6:31 |
| 4. | "Sugar Man" (Mason Remix) | 5:40 |
| 5. | "Sugar Man" (Indian Summer Remix) | 4:16 |
| 6. | "Sugar Man" (POOLCLVB Remix) | 4:43 |
| 7. | "Sugar Man" (original mix) | 4:01 |

==== Charts ====
| Chart (2015) | Peak position |
|---|---|
| Australia (ARIA) | 15 |

==== Certifications ====
| Region | Certification | Certified units/sales |
|---|---|---|
| Australia (ARIA) | Platinum | 70,000^{^} |
^{^} Shipments figures based on certification alone.

==== Release history ====
| Country | Release date | Format | Label |
|---|---|---|---|
| Australia | 28 November 2014 | Digital download | Sweat It Out! (SWEATDS138) |

== Movies ==
- The 2006 film Candy features the song.
- The 2012 BAFTA and Academy Award winning documentary Searching for Sugar Man features the song and its name references the song.
