= Baby Don't Get Hooked on Me (album) =

Baby, Don't Get Hooked on Me

Studio album by Mac Davis
- Released: 1972
- Recorded: December 1971 – March 1, 1972
- Studios: The Record Plant, Los Angeles; Muscle Shoals Sound Studio and FAME Studios, Muscle Shoals, Alabama
- Genre: Country
- Length: 34:29
- Label: Columbia
- Producers: Mac Davis; Rick Hall

Mac Davis chronology
I Believe in Music (1971)	Baby, Don't Get Hooked on Me (1972)	Mac Davis (1973)

Baby, Don't Get Hooked on Me is the third album by singer-songwriter and actor Mac Davis, which was considered his breakthrough album released in 1972.

== Track listing ==
All tracks are written by Mac Davis.

No.	Title	Length
1.	"Dream Me Home"	3:05
2.	"The Lonesomest Lonesome"	3:14
3.	"Everybody Loves A Love Song"	3:05
4.	"Naughty Girl"	2:39
5.	"Friend, Lover, Woman, Wife"	3:00
6.	"Half And Half"	2:57
7.	"Spread Your Love On Me"	3:11
8.	"Whoever Finds This, I Love You"	3:42
9.	"Poor Boy Boogie"	3:10
10.	"Baby Don't Get Hooked on Me"	3:06
11.	"The Words (Don't Come Easy)"	3:20

== Charts ==
Chart (1973)	Peak position
US Top LP's & Tape (Billboard)	11
Australia (Kent Music Report)	63

== Personnel ==
- Mac Davis (all tracks) – electric guitar, acoustic guitar, steel guitar, hambone, spoons, wobble board, beatboxing, harmonica, vocals
- Ken Bell (all tracks) – acoustic guitar
- Travis Wammack (track 9) – acoustic guitar, picking bow, harmonica
- Leo LeBlanc – steel guitar
- Bob Wray (all tracks) – bass guitar
- Clayton Ivey (track 3) – piano
- Tim Hensen – organ, vibraphone
- Morris "Tarp" Tarrant – drums
- Fred Prouty – cabasa, tom tom
- Mickey Buckins – percussion
- Charles Chalmers – backing vocals
- Donna Rhodes – backing vocals
- Sandra Rhodes – backing vocals
- Jimmie Haskell – string arranger
- Ed Caraeff – cover photography
