= Save the Children (film) =

- Theatrical release poster
- Directed by: Stan Lathan
- Written by: Matt Robinson
- Produced by: Matt Robinson; Clarence Avant
- Starring: Cannonball Adderley; Jerry Butler; Sammy Davis Jr. Dennis Edwards; Roberta Flack; Melvin Franklin; Marvin Gaye
- Cinematography: Charles Blackwell; Bob Fletcher; Robert Grant; Doug Harris; Rufus Hinton; Roy Lewis; Leroy Lucas; David Myers
- Edited by: George Bowers; Paul L. Evans
- Music by: Clarence Avant
- Production company: Stellar
- Distributed by: Paramount Pictures
- Release date: September 18, 1973; (New York City)
- Running time: 123 minutes
- Country: United States
- Language: English

Save the Children is a 1973 American concert film directed by Stan Lathan and produced by Matt Robinson. The concert documentary film chronicles performers that appeared during the five-day PUSH Expo in Chicago's International Amphitheater in 1972. The exposition featured art, music, educational institutions, social services, businesses and organizations and was developed by Operation PUSH (People United to Save Humanity).

The film was released on September 18, 1973, by Paramount Pictures. Performances are interspersed with street scenes of African-American communities in Chicago. Top musicians of the day showcased jazz, blues, soul, Motown, rock, gospel and other genres, in addition to talks by inspirational speakers.

The film's executive producer was prominent music manager Clarence Avant, who succeeded in having musicians from three top record labels, Motown, Stax and Atlantic, appear on stage together.

A soundtrack was released by Motown Records.

Among the standout performances were Bill Withers ("Lean on Me"), The Jackson 5, and Marvin Gaye, whose song "Save the Children" inspired the film's title.

Sammy Davis Jr. also appeared on stage, recently having faced scrutiny for embracing President Richard Nixon at the 1972 Republican National Convention. Some in the audience booed him, but Davis won over many with a heartfelt rendition of his hit "I've Gotta Be Me". Excerpts of his performance are also shown in the Clarence Avant documentary The Black Godfather.

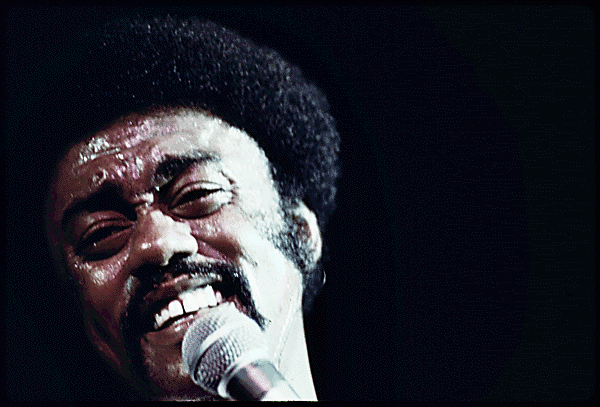
Johnny Taylor performs at the PUSH Expo in the fall of 1973.

In 2023, the film was digitally restored and released on Netflix. It was screened at the 2024 Chicago Film Festival in the presence of the director and many of those who attended the event over 50 years prior.

== Featured performers and speakers ==
- Rev. Jesse Jackson (head of Operation PUSH)
- The Adderley Brothers
  - Cannonball Adderley
  - Nat Adderley
- Jerry Butler
- Sammy Davis Jr.
- The Temptations
  - Dennis Edwards
  - Melvin Franklin
  - Damon Harris
  - Richard Street
  - Otis Williams
- Roberta Flack
- Marvin Gaye
- Cuba Gooding, Sr.
- The Jackson 5
  - Jackie Jackson
  - Jermaine Jackson
  - Marlon Jackson
  - Michael Jackson
  - Tito Jackson
- Gladys Knight & the Pips
  - Gladys Knight
  - Merald "Bubba" Knight
- Ramsey Lewis
- Curtis Mayfield
- Nancy Wilson
- Bill Withers
- Dick Gregory
- Isaac Hayes
- Zulema
- Albertina Walker
- Loretta Oliver
- The PUSH Mass Choir
- The Chi-Lites
- The Staple Singers
- The Main Ingredient
- The O'Jays
- Rev. James Cleveland
- Quincy Jones
- Brenda Lee Eager
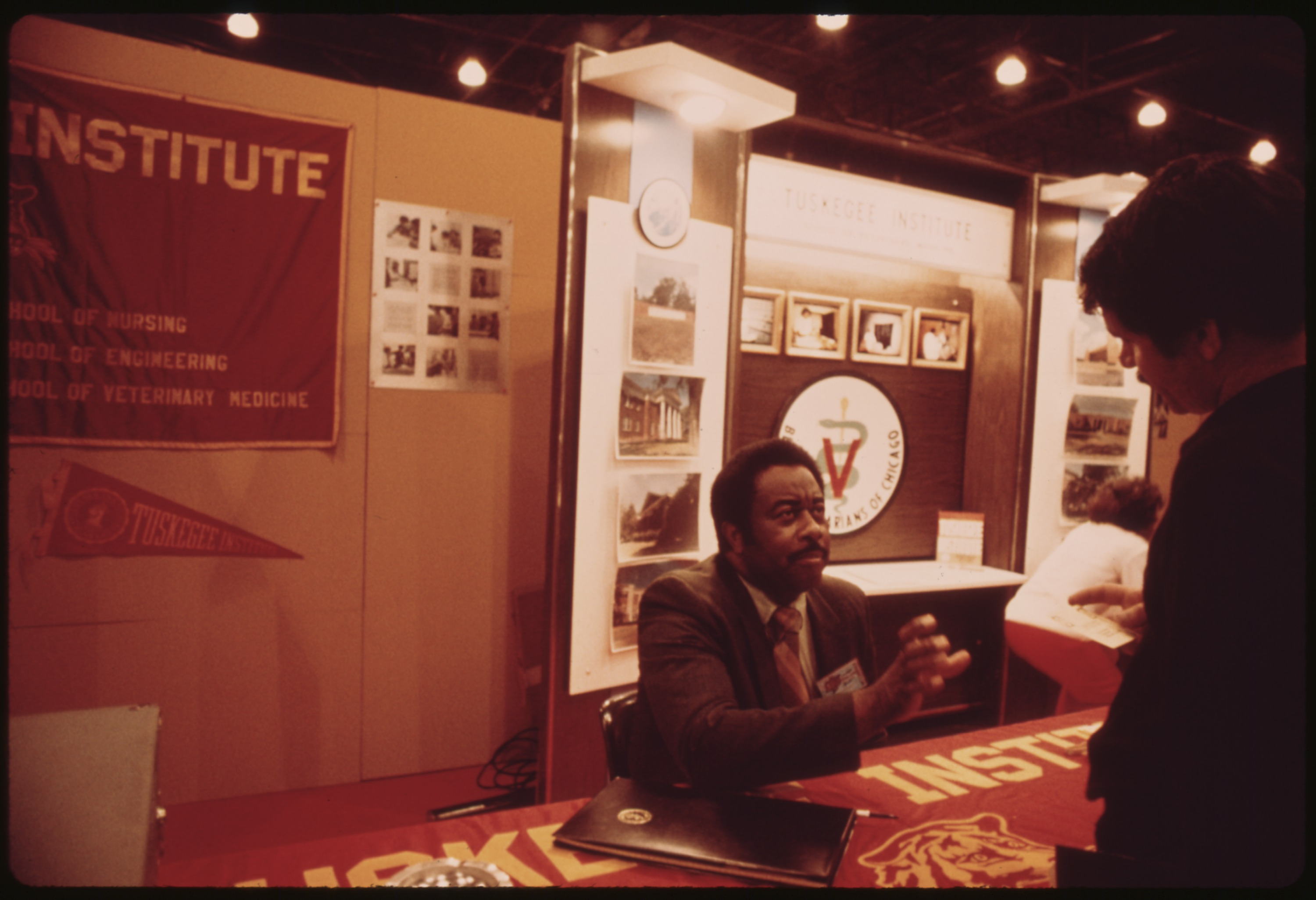
- Education was the prominent theme at the Black Expo held in Chicago in 1973.
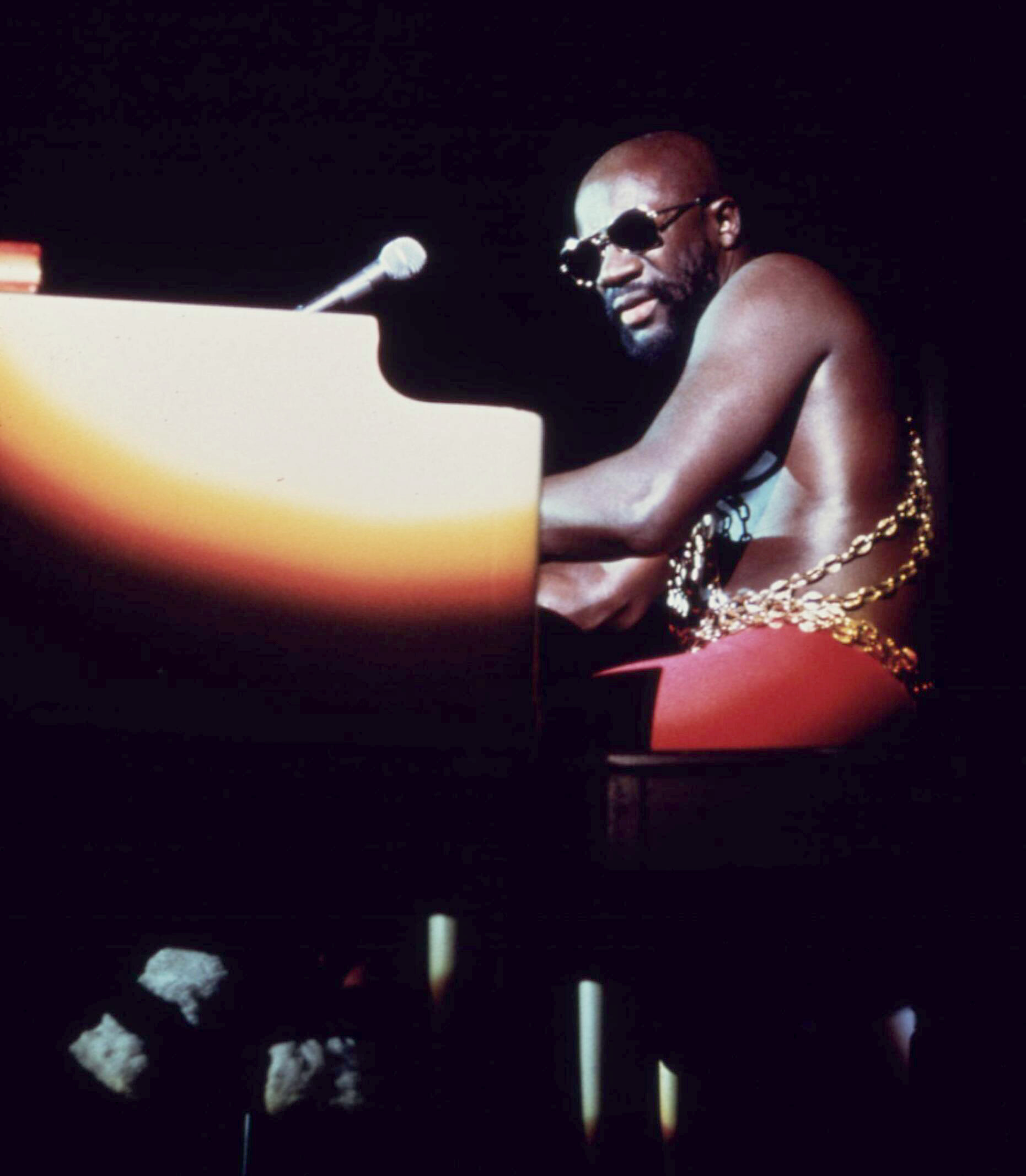
  Isaac Hayes at the PISH Expo 1973.
  Jackie Verdell
- Rev. Willie Barrow
- Don Cornelius
- Yvonne Daniels
- Ossie Davis
- Rev. Henry Hardy
- Smokey Robinson
- Richard Roundtree
- Bill Russell
- Kim Weston

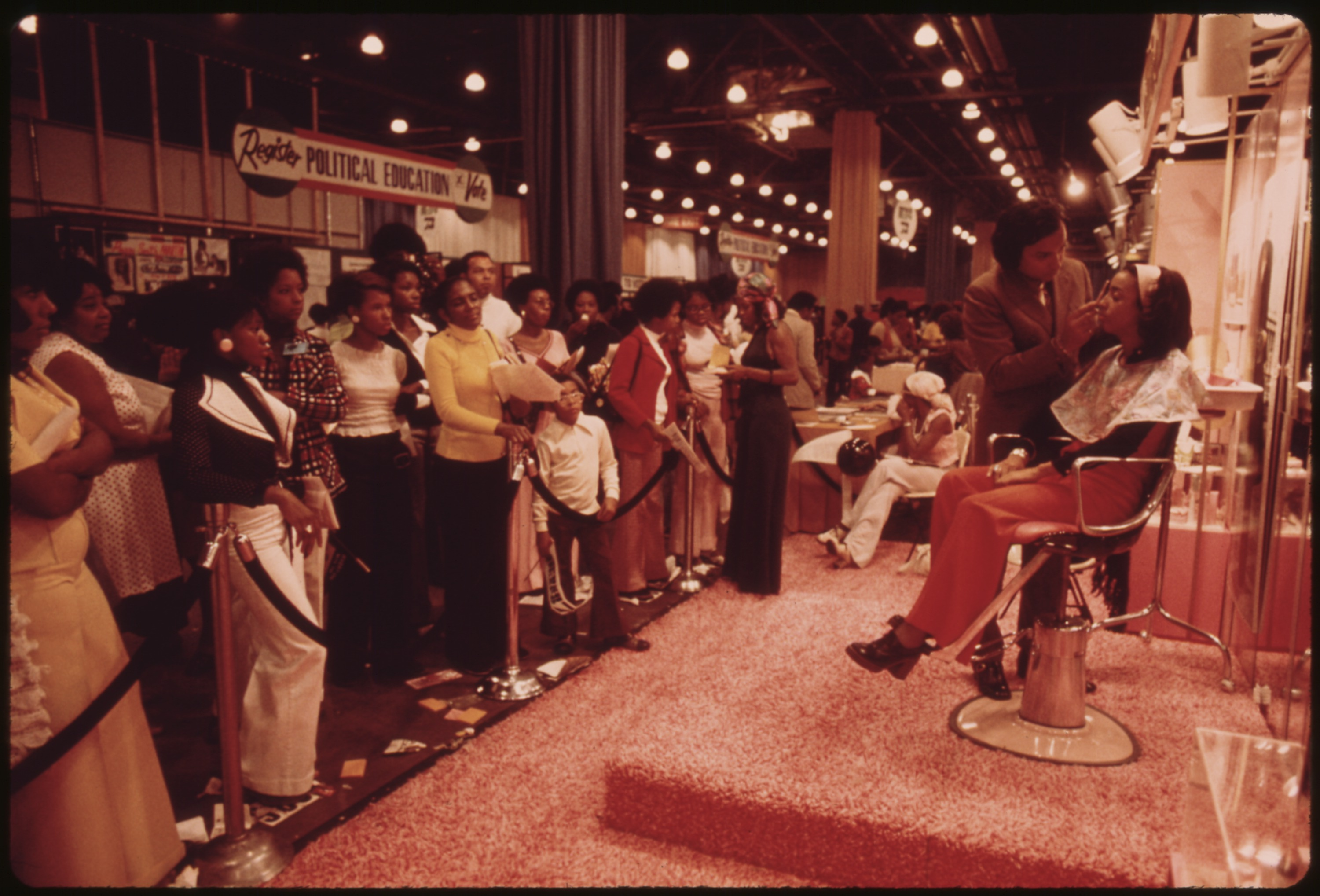
Black products and services was one of the themes at the Black Expo held in Chicago.

== See also ==
- Wattstax (1972 benefit concert and film in Watts, Los Angeles)
- Summer of Soul (documentary about 1969 Harlem Cultural Festival)
- List of American films of 1973
