= We No Speak Americano =

2010 single by Yolanda Be Cool and DCUP

Single by Yolanda Be Cool and DCUP
- Language: Neapolitan
- Released: 27 February 2010
- Genre: Electro swing; house
- Length: 4:30 (original version); 2:58 (radio edit); 2:11 (UK radio edit)
- Label: Sweat It Out! (Australia) All Around The World (UK)
- Songwriters: Andrew Stanley; Matthew Handley; Duncan MacLennan; Renato Carosone; Nicola Salerno
- Producers: Yolanda Be Cool; DCUP

Yolanda Be Cool singles chronology
"Holy Cow" (2009)	"We No Speak Americano" (2010)	"Le Bump" (2011)

"We No Speak Americano" is a song by Australian band Yolanda Be Cool and producer DCUP. It was released on the independent Australian label Sweat It Out on 27 February 2010. The song samples the 1956 Italian song "Tu vuò fà l'americano" in the Neapolitan language by Renato Carosone, written by Carosone and Nicola Salerno. "We No Speak Americano" became a hit in Europe, Australia, and South America (where the song is also known as Pa-Panamericano) as well as a top 40 hit in the U.S. and Canada. It also won the 2010 ARIA award for "Best Dance Release." The song had sold over 1 million digital copies in the United States as of 10 April 2011.

The song was featured on the soundtrack of the 2011 films The Inbetweeners Movie and Hop, the 2012 film Madagascar 3: Europe's Most Wanted, the 2013 film The Great Beauty and the 2018 film Peter Rabbit. It also featured in Episode 2 of the 2011 Korean drama adaptation City Hunter and on the video games DanceStar Party (only in European editions) Zumba Fitness 2 and Just Dance 4. "We No Speak Americano" was later sampled by Cuban American rapper Pitbull for his Spanish-language tune "Bon, Bon", crediting Yolanda Be Cool and DCUP as producers of his song. American gymnast Gabby Douglas used the song in her gold medal-winning final floor routine at the 2012 Summer Olympics in London.

== Composition ==
The song is performed in the key of B♭ minor with a tempo of 125 beats per minute in cut (2/2) time. The vocals in the song span from A_{3} to E♭_{4}.

== Music video ==
The official music video for the song, directed by Andy Hylton, is a take on classic silent film comedies and features a Chaplinesque Italian protagonist in 1910s New York City, in a bid to raise some quick cash to propose to the young woman that he met earlier in the video.

This music video appeared in the episode "Bounty Hunters" of Beavis and Butthead.

== Cover versions ==
- The Chipettes covered this song for the Alvin and the Chipmunks: Chipwrecked: Music from the Motion Picture album and in Alvin and the Chipmunks: Chipwrecked. This version is mashed with Miami Sound Machine's "Conga".
- For the video game Just Dance 4, a cover by in-house artists was produced. Said artists are credited as "Hit the Electro Beat". The same name was later used for the cover of "Blue (Da Ba Dee)" in Just Dance 2018, then of "Mi Mi Mi" in Just Dance 2019.

== Credits and personnel ==
- Lead vocals – Renato Carosone
- Lyrics – Matthew Handley, Andrew, Duncan Maclennan, Renato Carosone, Nicola Salerno
- Producer – Matthew Handley, Andrew Stanley, Duncan Maclennan
- Mastering engineer – Robin Petras (PureFocus Mastering)

== Charts ==
=== Weekly charts ===
Chart (2010–2011)	Peak position
Australia (ARIA)	4
Austria (Ö3 Austria Top 40)	1
Belgium (Ultratop 50 Flanders)	1
Belgium (Ultratop 50 Wallonia)	1
Bulgaria Airplay (BAMP)	1
Canada Hot 100 (Billboard)	16
CIS Airplay (TopHit)	9
Czech Republic Airplay (ČNS IFPI)	1
Denmark (Tracklisten)	1
Europe (European Hot 100 Singles)	1
Finland (Suomen virallinen lista)	1
France (SNEP)	2
France Download (SNEP)	1
Germany (GfK)	1
Hungary (Dance Top 40)	1
Hungary (Rádiós Top 40)	23
Ireland (IRMA)	1
Israel International Airplay (Media Forest)	1
Italy (FIMI)	3
Luxembourg Digital Songs (Billboard)	1
Netherlands (Dutch Top 40)	1
Netherlands (Single Top 100)	1
New Zealand (Recorded Music NZ)	2
Norway (VG-lista)	4
Poland (Polish Airplay TV)	1
Poland Dance (ZPAV)	1
Romania (Romanian Top 100)	1
Russia Airplay (TopHit)	11
Scottish Singles Sales (Official Charts)	1
Slovakia Airplay (ČNS IFPI)	1
South Korea (Gaon)	40
South Korea International (Gaon)	1
Spain (Promusicae)	2
Sweden (Sverigetopplistan)	1
Switzerland (Schweizer Hitparade)	1
UK Dance (Official Charts)	1
UK Singles (Official Charts)	1
Ukraine Airplay (TopHit)	34
US Billboard Hot 100	29
US Dance Club Songs (Billboard)	21
US Pop Airplay (Billboard)	37

=== Year-end charts ===
Chart (2010)	Position
Australia (ARIA)	34
Austria (Ö3 Austria Top 40)	1
Belgium (Ultratop 50 Flanders)	3
Belgium (Ultratop 50 Wallonia)	13
Brazil (Crowley)	42
Canada (Canadian Hot 100)	97
CIS (TopHit)	65
Denmark (Tracklisten)	5
France (SNEP)	12
Germany (Official German Charts)	5
Hungary (Dance Top 40)	3
Hungary (Rádiós Top 40)	89
Ireland (IRMA)	19
Italy (FIMI)	16
Netherlands (Dutch Top 40)	11
Netherlands (Single Top 100)	1
New Zealand (Recorded Music NZ)	25
Romania (Romanian Top 100)	18
Russia Airplay (TopHit)	72
Spain (PROMUSICAE)	3
Sweden (Sverigetopplistan)	11
Switzerland (Schweizer Hitparade)	2
UK Singles (OCC)	9

2011 year-end chart performance for "We No Speak Americano"
Chart (2011)	Position
Canada (Canadian Hot 100)	93
Hungary (Dance Top 40)	51
Ukraine Airplay (TopHit)	186

=== Decade-end charts ===
Chart (2010s)	Rank
Netherlands (Single Top 100)	28

== Certifications and sales ==
Region	Certification	Certified units/sales
Australia (ARIA)	2× Platinum	140,000^{^}
Belgium (BRMA)	Platinum	30,000^{*}
Denmark (IFPI Danmark)	Platinum	30,000^{^}
Germany (BVMI)	2× Platinum	600,000^{^}
Italy (FIMI)	Platinum	30,000^{*}
New Zealand (RMNZ)	Platinum	15,000^{*}
Norway (IFPI Norway)	5× Platinum	50,000^{‡}
Russia (NFPF) ringtone	2× Platinum	400,000^{*}
South Korea	—	943,091
Spain (Promusicae)	3× Platinum	120,000^{*}
Sweden (GLF)	6× Platinum	240,000^{‡}
Switzerland (IFPI Switzerland)	Gold	15,000^{^}
United Kingdom (BPI)	Platinum	600,000^{^}
United States (RIAA)	Platinum	1,000,000^{*}
^{*} Sales figures based on certification alone.^{^} Shipments figures based on certification alone.^{‡} Sales+streaming figures based on certification alone.

== Other versions ==
=== Marco Calliari version ===
In the United Kingdom, a cover version sung by Quebec-born Italian singer-songwriter Marco Calliari entered and peaked at number 26 on the UK Singles Chart.

=== Russian parody ===
In Russia, a parody version of the track appeared in the summer 2010, with vocals in Russian by the band Трикотаж (Knit-Wear) featuring Dj Solovey. This version was entitled Подзаебало (Sick of it), with the lyrics па-падзаебало mirroring pa-parle americano of the original. The new lyrics make references to the record heat wave in Russia of summer 2010, The Twilight Saga, Lady Gaga, and other current socio-cultural events.

=== "Un papa americano (An American pope)" ===
In December 2009, Spanish comedian José Mota sang a parody version of the track during his annual New Year's Eve TV special. The parody version replaces the original lyric "Pa, pa l'americano" to the similar sounding Spanish sentence "un papa americano", that translates to "an American pope". The rest of the lyrics are also replaced by ones who reference the Catholic Church and American culture. In March 2013, the song rose in popularity in Spanish-speaking countries due to the election of Argentine-born Pope Francis, as he would become the first pope to be born in the Americas. It subsequently resurged in May 2025 following the election of Pope Leo XIV, being the first pope born in the United States.

=== "Por Panamericana" and "El Chocoano" ===
In Argentina, various parody versions of the song were made. Among them, one resulted in very successful hit, that would even be played at discos as a companion for the original song. The best-known version is called "Por Panamericana", and the voice recorded on the record tell a story about being stopped by the police at the Panamerican Highway for speeding. Los Cantores de Chipuco (Colombia) also made their own parody of this song, called "El Chocoano".

=== "Bi Bi pro Americano" ===
After Benjamin Netanyahu's 2011 speech to the United States Congress, Noy Alooshe spoofed it to the tune of "We No Speak Americano" as "Bi Bi pro Americano".

=== Hand dance video ===
In July 2010, Irish dancers Suzanne Cleary and Peter Harding (who perform as the group Up and Over It) released a music video filmed by Jonny Reed. Using "We No Speak Americano" as background music, the video features Cleary and Harding performing an elaborately choreographed tabletop dance using only their hands and arms, and wearing deadpan expressions throughout the song. By July 2020 it had been watched 10.257.000 times.

=== "We No Speak Huttese" ===
A parody of the song titled "We No Speak Huttese" can be found in Kinect Star Wars for the Xbox 360 Kinect peripheral. It is featured in the Galactic Dance Off mini game. The vocals are replaced with Jabba the Hutt's and the instrumentals are recreated in the style of the Max Rebo Band.

=== "Angry (We No Speak Americano)" ===
Korean idol group LPG covered the song in 2011.

== See also ==
- List of number-one club tracks of 2021 (Australia)
- List of Romanian Top 100 number ones of the 2010s
