= Ralph Graham (singer) =

American singer-songwriter

- Origin: Roxbury, Boston, Massachusetts, U.S.
- Occupation: Singer-songwriter
- Labels: Sussex Records, RCA Records

Ralph E. Graham (born c.1944) is an American singer-songwriter from Roxbury, Boston, Massachusetts. As a songwriter he had success with the song "Differently" which was recorded by Thelma Houston, and Jerry Butler. After an initial album with Sussex Records in 1974 he signed to RCA for two more albums.

== Discography ==
- Differently Sussex Records 1974
- Wisdom RCA APL1-1918 1976
- Extensions RCA APL1-2307 1977
