= Searching for Sugar Man =

2012 film by Malik Bendjelloul

- US theatrical release poster
- Directed by: Malik Bendjelloul
- Written by: Malik Bendjelloul
- Produced by: Malik Bendjelloul; Simon Chinn
- Starring: Sixto Rodriguez
- Cinematography: Camilla Skagerström
- Edited by: Malik Bendjelloul
- Music by: Rodriguez
- Production companies: Red Box Film; Passion Pictures; Canfield Pictures; Sveriges Television; Yle Co-Production; Hysteria Film
- Distributed by: NonStop Entertainment (Sweden); StudioCanal (United Kingdom)
- Release dates: 19 January 2012 (Sundance); 26 July 2012 (United Kingdom); 24 August 2012 (Sweden); 22 February 2013 (Finland)
- Running time: 86 minutes
- Countries: Sweden; United Kingdom; Finland
- Language: English
- Box office: $9.1 million

Searching for Sugar Man is a 2012 documentary film, written and directed by Malik Bendjelloul, which details the efforts in the late 1990s of two Cape Town fans, Stephen "Sugar" Segerman and Craig Bartholomew Strydom, to find out whether the rumoured death of 1970s Mexican-American musician Sixto Rodriguez was true and, if not, to learn what had become of him. Rodriguez's music, which had never achieved success in his home country of the United States, had become very popular in South Africa, although little was known about him there.

On 10 February 2013, the film won the BAFTA Award for Best Documentary at the 66th British Academy Film Awards in London and two weeks later, it won the Academy Award for Best Documentary Feature at the 85th Academy Awards in Hollywood.

== Production ==
While he initially used Super 8 film to record some stylised shots for the film, director Malik Bendjelloul ran out of money for more film to record the final few shots. After three years of cutting-room work, the main financial backers of the film threatened to withdraw funding to finish it. Bendjelloul resorted to filming the remaining stylised shots on his smartphone using an iPhone app called 8mm Vintage Camera.

== Release ==
Searching for Sugar Man was the opening film at the Sundance Film Festival in January 2012, where it won the Special Jury Prize and the Audience Award for best international documentary. It was released in the United Kingdom on 26 July 2012, and had a limited release (New York and Los Angeles) in the United States the following day.

The film performed well during its theatrical release, earning $3,696,196 at the US box office (82nd of all US docs on Box Office Mojo).

== Reception ==
=== Critical response ===
Searching for Sugar Man received widespread critical acclaim. On review aggregator website Rotten Tomatoes, it has a 95% approval rating based on reviews from 133 critics, with an average score of 8.0/10; the site's "critics consensus" reads: "A fascinating portrait of a forgotten musical pioneer, Searching for Sugar Man is by turns informative and mysterious." On Metacritic, the film has a weighted average score of 79 out of 100 based on 32 critics, indicating "generally favorable reviews".

Roger Ebert of the Chicago Sun-Times gave the film a glowing four-star review, writing "I hope you're able to see this film...and yes, it exists because we need for it to." The New York Times critic Manohla Dargis also wrote a positive review, calling the film "a hugely appealing documentary about fans, faith and an enigmatic Age of Aquarius musician who burned bright and hopeful before disappearing." Dargis subsequently named Searching for Sugar Man one of the 10 best films of 2012.

==== Criticism ====
The film omits that Rodriguez was successful in Australia in the 1970s and toured there in 1979 and 1981. Because of this omission, some critics have accused it of engaging in "myth-making". However, the film focuses on Rodriguez's mysterious reputation in South Africa and the attempts of music historians there to track him down in the mid-1990s. South Africans were unaware of his Australian success due to the harsh censorship enacted by the apartheid regime, coupled with international sanctions that made any communication with the outside world on the subject of banned artists virtually impossible.

However, Rodriguez's music was never actually censored or banned in apartheid-era South Africa. A 2021 study revealed that the film's scene in the Archive of Censored Material was entirely staged; no such place exists and the footage was instead shot among random stacks in a university library. The supposedly censored version of Rodriguez's Cold Fact album retrieved from the shelf with scratched-up grooves and a hand-written "avoid" caution was actually a used copy that the director had acquired himself and defaced for the purposes of the scene. While a South African Broadcasting Corporation document shown in the film does indicate a radio ban of the song "Sugar Man," it actually dates from the release of the CD edition in the 1990s; specifically, the song was rejected by radio censors for its drug content in early 1993, three years after the release of Nelson Mandela. As the author of the 2021 study concludes: "Paradoxically, in implementing his narrative Bendjelloul ends up mimicking the very apartheid state he claims Rodriguez assisted in dismantling. He wanted to uphold the idea of Rodriguez as anti-apartheid icon within South Africa, and to do this he obscured the truth availed to him during his research with his respondents and instead staged reenactments that portrayed his fiction rather than the reality."

=== Awards and nominations ===
- Searching for Sugar Man won the award for Best Documentary at the 85th Academy Awards. Rodriguez declined to attend the awards ceremony, as he did not want to overshadow the filmmakers' achievement. Upon accepting the award, producer Simon Chinn remarked on this generosity, saying: "That just about says everything about that man and his story that you want to know." Malik Bendjelloul said on stage: "Thanks to one of the greatest singers ever, Rodriguez."
- The film won the award for Best Documentary at the 66th British Academy Film Awards on 10 February 2013.
- The Directors Guild of America awarded the film the DGA Award for Best Documentary on 2 February 2013.
- The Writers Guild of America awarded the film the WGA Award for Best Documentary.
- The Producers Guild of America awarded the film the PGA Award for Best Documentary.
- The American Cinema Editors awarded the film the ACE Eddie Award for Best Documentary.
- The film won the Guldbagge Award for Best Documentary at the 48th Guldbagge Awards.
- The film won the National Board of Review award for Best Documentary on 5 December 2012.
- The International Documentary Association (IDA) awarded Searching for Sugar Man Best Feature and Best Music at the 28th Annual IDA Documentary Awards on 7 December 2012 at the Directors Guild of America building, Los Angeles, California.
- The film won Best Documentary at the Critics' Choice Awards.
- Searching for Sugar Man won the Special Jury Prize and the Audience Award for Best International Documentary at the Sundance Film Festival. It also won audience awards at the Los Angeles Film Festival, the Durban International Film Festival, and the Melbourne Film Festival, and was 2nd-place winner of the Audience Award at the Tribeca Film Festival.
- The film won the Grand Jury Prize at the Moscow International Film Festival.
- At the International Documentary Film Festival Amsterdam, held in November 2012, Searching for Sugar Man won both the Audience and the Best Music Documentary awards.
- At the Doha Tribeca Film Festival (DTFF), Searching for Sugar Man shared the "Best of the Fest" audience award with the Chinese feature film Full Circle and was awarded $50,000 (US).
- The film won Best Film (The Audience Award) at the Vilnius International Film Festival.
- The film won Best Film at the In-Edit Festival in Santiago de Chile.
- Searching for Sugar Man was nominated for five awards at the 6th Annual Cinema Eye Honors for Nonfiction Filmmaking, tying with The Imposter for the most nominations. Winners were announced on 9 January 2013 at New York City's Museum of the Moving Image in Astoria, Queens:
  - Nonfiction Feature Filmmaking—Malik Bendjelloul and Simon Chinn
  - Production—Simon Chinn
  - Graphic Design and Animation—Oskar Gullstrand, Arvid Steen (won)
  - Debut Feature Film—Malik Bendjelloul
  - Audience Choice Prize—Malik Bendjelloul
- The film was the recipient of the Australian Film Critics Association award for Best Documentary of 2012, beating the locally produced musical documentary All the Way Through Evening.

== Soundtrack ==
The film's soundtrack is a compilation of songs from Rodriguez's two studio albums, as well as three tracks from his unfinished third album. It reached No. 3 in Sweden in early 2013 when the Academy Award nomination was announced, and had been in the charts for 26 weeks by the time it received the award in February 2013. In Denmark, the soundtrack reached No. 18, and in New Zealand it reached No. 24.
