= Cold Fact =

Studio album by Rodriguez
- Released: March 1970
- Recorded: August–September 1969
- Studios: Tera Shirma, Detroit
- Genres: Folk rock; psychedelic folk
- Length: 32:23
- Label: Sussex
- Producers: Mike Theodore; Dennis Coffey

Rodriguez chronology
| Cold Fact (1970) | Coming from Reality (1971) |

Professional ratings
Review scores
| Source | Rating |
|---|---|
| AllMusic | 4/5 stars |
| The Austin Chronicle | 4/5 stars |
| The New Zealand Herald | 5/5 stars |
| Pitchfork | 8.0 |
| PopMatters | 8/10 |
| Rolling Stone Germany | 3/5 stars |

Cold Fact is the debut studio album by American singer-songwriter Rodriguez, released in the United States by Sussex Records in March 1970. The album sold poorly in the United States, but performed better in South Africa and Australia, with Rodriguez touring Australia in 1979.

In 1971 the album was released in South Africa by A&M Records. In 1976, several thousand copies of Cold Fact were found in a New York warehouse and sold out in Australia in a few weeks. It went to No. 23 on the Australian album charts in 1978, staying on the charts for fifty-five weeks. In 1998 Cold Fact was awarded a platinum disc in South Africa, and was five-times platinum in Australia. Rodriguez has since toured South Africa and Australia with much success, but remained relatively unknown in his native country of the US. This began to change after the reissues of his albums in the US by Light in the Attic Records in 2008 and 2009, and even further in 2012 with the Academy Award winning documentary film Searching for Sugar Man, which soon led to appearances on major American television shows like 60 Minutes and The Late Show with David Letterman.

Cold Fact has sold 201,000 since Nielsen SoundScan started tracking in 1991, 173,000 of those after the film opened, 98,000 in the wake of the Oscar win. Coming from Reality has moved 105,000 albums, 99,000 since the movie hit, 60,000 post-Academy Awards. The film's soundtrack album (which was picked up by Sony's Legacy catalog division) boasts 152,000 in sales.

Sugar Man audio sample

Hate Street Dialogue audio sample

== Track listing ==
All songs written by Sixto Rodriguez, except (5, 10) by Gary Harvey, Mike Theodore and Dennis Coffey.

| No. | Title | Length |
|---|---|---|
| 1. | "Sugar Man" | 3:45 |
| 2. | "Only Good for Conversation" | 2:25 |
| 3. | "Crucify Your Mind" | 2:30 |
| 4. | "This Is Not a Song, It's an Outburst: Or, the Establishment Blues" | 2:05 |
| 5. | "Hate Street Dialogue" | 2:30 |
| 6. | "Forget It" | 1:50 |
| 7. | "Inner City Blues" | 3:23 |
| 8. | "I Wonder" | 2:30 |
| 9. | "Like Janis" | 2:32 |
| 10. | "Gommorah (A Nursery Rhyme)" | 2:20 |
| 11. | "Rich Folks Hoax" | 3:05 |
| 12. | "Jane S. Piddy" | 2:54 |

== Personnel ==
There were no musicians credited on the original album sleeve, but Rodriguez and Mike Theodore filled in the gaps:

- Rodriguez – vocals, acoustic guitar
- Dennis Coffey – electric guitar, bass guitar
- Mike Theodore – keyboards, brass and string arrangements
- Andrew Smith – drums
- Bob Pangborn – percussion
- Bob Babbitt – bass guitar
- Detroit Symphony (Leader Gordon Staples) – strings
- Leader Carl Reatz – horns (trombones, baritone sax)
- Friends and family of Joyce Vincent and Telma Hopkins – children's choir on "Gommorah"

Technical

- Recorded in Detroit in August and September 1969.
- Arranged and produced by Mike Theodore and Dennis Coffey.
- Engineering by Mike Theodore at Tera-Shirma Studio, Detroit.
- Ray Hall at RCA New York – remix
- Ransier and Anderson – photography
- Nancy Chester (See/Hear! & How!) – cover design

== Samples and features ==
"Sugar Man" was sampled in "You're Da Man", from the 2001 Nas album Stillmatic.

In 2014, the French Deep House and Electro music producer Tristan Casara featured "Hate Street Dialogue" on his album for a new release credited to "The Avener Feat. Rodriguez". The release The Wanderings of the Avener charted in France.

"I Wonder" was used in Season 2 Episode 1 of the Australian TV series "Colin From Accounts".

== Compilations ==
"Sugar Man" was the opening track on David Holmes' 2002 compilation Come Get It I Got It.

== Chart performance ==
| Chart (1978) | Peak position |
|---|---|
| Australian Albums (Kent Music Report) | 23 |
| Chart (2013–2014) | Peak position |
| Australian Albums (ARIA) | 11 |
| Belgian Albums (Ultratop Flanders) | 50 |
| Belgian Albums (Ultratop Wallonia) | 180 |
| Danish Albums (Hitlisten) | 4 |
| Dutch Albums (Album Top 100) | 54 |
| Finnish Albums (Suomen virallinen lista) | 18 |
| French Albums (SNEP) | 81 |
| New Zealand Albums (RMNZ) | 20 |
| South African Albums (RISA) | 16 |
| Spanish Albums (Promusicae) | 17 |
| Swedish Albums (Sverigetopplistan) | 10 |
| UK Albums (Official Charts) | 39 |
| Chart (2017) | Peak position |
| German Albums (Offizielle Top 100) | 78 |

=== Certifications ===
| Region | Certification | Certified units/sales |
|---|---|---|
| Australia (ARIA) | Platinum | 70,000^{^} |
| New Zealand (RMNZ) | Gold | 7,500^{‡} |
| United Kingdom (BPI) | Silver | 60,000^{*} |
^{*} Sales figures based on certification alone.^{^} Shipments figures based on certification alone.^{‡} Sales+streaming figures based on certification alone.
