= Gallery (band) =

American soft rock band

- Origin: Detroit, Michigan, U.S.
- Genres: Pop rock, soft rock
- Years active: 1971–1974, 2022–present
- Labels: A&M, Sussex
- Past members: Jim Gold; Bill Nova; Dennis Kovarik; Cal Freeman; Brent Anderson; Paul Franklin; Danny Brucato; Fred DiCenso

Gallery is an American soft rock band, formed in Detroit, Michigan by Jim Gold. While Gallery did record a number of songs, they are most famous for their 1972 hit single "Nice to Be with You", written by Gold. The song was arranged and produced by Dennis Coffey and Mike Theodore and released by Sussex Records. It became an international hit single, reaching the top five in the U.S., Canada, Australia, and New Zealand; sales of one million copies earned the band a gold record. The song reached No. 4 on the U.S. Billboard Hot 100 and remained in the Hot 100 for 22 weeks, tying with War's "Slippin' into Darkness" for most weeks on the chart during 1972. Billboard ranked it as the No. 14 song for 1972. "Nice to Be with You" reached No. 1 on Cashbox, WCFL, and WLS.

Gallery followed up a few months later with a cover of Mac Davis's "I Believe in Music", which charted moderately well at No. 22 on Billboard and No. 13 on Cashbox.

In early 1973, Gallery's third and last Hot 100 hit, Tom Lazaros's "Big City Miss Ruth Ann", reached No. 23 on the Hot 100, No. 12 on Cashbox, and No. 7 on WCFL. A remake of The Crickets' "Maybe Baby" "Bubbled Under" at No. 118 in July 1973.

In early 1974 "Friends" / "Love Every Little Thing About You" failed to chart. Gallery disbanded, and Gold embarked on a solo career.

Gold reformed the band in 2022, now billing themselves as Jim Gold & Gallery.

== Members ==
- Jim Gold (born January 12, 1947, Detroit, Michigan) – lead vocals, guitar
- Brent Anderson – backing vocals, guitar
- Bill Nova – backing vocals, percussion
- Cal Freeman (born June 26, 1942 – died October 29, 2018) – guitar
- Paul Franklin (born May 31, 1954, Detroit, Michigan) – steel guitar
- Dennis Kovarik – bass
- Danny Brucato – drums
- Fred DiCenso (born January 23, 1950 – died 2021) – guitar

== Discography ==
=== Albums ===
| Year | Album details | Chart positions | |
| Year | Album details | US | AUS |
|---|---|---|---|
| 1972 | Nice to Be with You | 75 | 54 |
| 1972 | Gallery featuring Jim Gold | — | — |

=== Singles ===
| Year | Title | Chart positions | | | | Album |
| Year | Title | US | US AC | AUS | CAN | Album |
|---|---|---|---|---|---|---|
| 1972 | "You're Always on My Mind" | — | — | — | — | Nice to Be with You |
| 1972 | "Nice to Be with You" | 4 | 5 | 4 | 1 | Nice to Be with You |
| 1972 | "I Believe in Music" | 22 | 12 | 62 | 5 | Nice to Be with You |
| 1973 | "Big City Miss Ruth Ann" | 23 | 10 | 91 | — | Nice to Be with You |
| 1973 | "Rest in Peace" | 110* | — | — | — | Gallery featuring Jim Gold |
| 1973 | "Maybe Baby" | 118 | — | — | — | Gallery featuring Jim Gold |
| 1974 | "Living Next Door to Alice" | — | — | — | — | Gallery featuring Jim Gold |
| 1974 | "Friends" | — | — | — | — | Gallery featuring Jim Gold |
"—" denotes a recording that did not chart or was not released in that territory. US charts is Billboard unless otherwise noted. * Cashbox singles chart.
