= Sussex Records =

American record label

- Parent company: Sussex Records
- Founded: 1969
- Founder: Clarence Avant
- Defunct: 1975
- Status: Defunct
- Distributors: Buddah Records (1969–1974) self-distributed (1974–1975)
- Genre: Rhythm and blues
- Country of origin: United States
- Location: Los Angeles, California

Sussex Records Inc. was a Los Angeles-based record label that existed from 1969 to 1975. It was founded by music executive and businessman Clarence Avant.

== History ==
Sussex Records was launched in December 1969 by Avant, who had previously set up another mainly black music label, Venture Records for MGM. An offshoot of Buddah Records, who also distributed its records until 1974, when Sussex switched to independent distribution until its closure.

The company folded in July 1975, due to unpaid state and federal taxes amounting to $62,000. The Internal Revenue Service padlocked the offices and auctioned off all assets. Many of the label's master recordings disappeared and were presumed destroyed, but were later retrieved.

Bill Withers was the label's best-selling artist with a string of pop and R&B hits and several successful albums. They included three Platinum singles, "Ain't No Sunshine" (#3 pop, #6 R&B, 1971), the label's only chart-topper, "Lean on Me" (#1 pop and #1 R&B, 1972) and "Use Me" (#2 pop and #2 R&B, 1972). His recordings, many self-written and produced, were later purchased by Columbia Records when Withers signed with the label in 1975.

In 1971, the label garnered another gold disc with the Detroit guitarist Dennis Coffey, who reached #6 on the pop chart and #9 on the R&B chart with "Scorpio". The Presidents had a hit for Sussex in 1970 with "5-10-15-20 (25-30 Years of Love)" (#5 R&B, #11 pop), produced by Van McCoy. The group from Washington D.C., had released the label's first single, "For You", a minor R&B hit, a few months earlier.

In 1972, guitarist Eddy Senay, who had a hit "Hot Thang"; signed to the label.

After Sussex folded, Avant went on to form another record company, Tabu Records.

The Sussex catalog is now controlled by 43 North Broadway, LLC.

== Subsidiary ==
A subsidiary of Sussex was Clarama Records. It was launched by Clarence Avant in 1974. One early act on the label was Brenda & Albert who were formerly with Faith Hope and Charity.

== Sixto Rodriguez ==
The label is also known for signing American singer-songwriter and guitarist Sixto Rodriguez, who recorded and released the albums Cold Fact in 1970 and Coming from Reality in 1971. Rodriguez was dropped from the label after both albums sold poorly in the US.

Despite the poor sales of the albums in the US, they sold extremely well in South Africa, Australia and surrounding countries. The albums proved successful and influential, eventually being certified platinum and causing a cultural phenomenon. Rodriguez has since remained a mystery artist in his native country of the US, but a cultural figure in many others.

Rodriguez found more fame with the release of the 2012 documentary film Searching for Sugar Man, a documentary film directed and written by Malik Bendjelloul, which details the efforts in the late 1990s of two Cape Town fans, Stephen "Sugar" Segerman and Craig Bartholomew Strydom, to find out whether the rumored death of Rodriguez was true and, if not, to discover what had become of him.

== Artists ==
- Amish
- Willie Bobo
- Billy Charne
- Dennis Coffey
- Priscilla Coolidge-Jones
- Creative Source
- Zulema Cusseaux
- Dandelion Wine
- Gallery
- Faith, Hope & Charity
- Lonette
- Masterfleet
- Mutzie
- The Presidents
- The Decisisons
- The Primo People [The Primo Family]
- Ralph Graham
- Rodriguez
- Eddy Senay
- Segments of Time
- The Soul Searchers
- Sun
- Wadsworth Mansion
- Wednesday
- Bill Withers
- Yukon

== See also ==
- List of record labels
- Tabu Records
