= When the Lovelight Starts Shining Through His Eyes =

Single by the Supremes

from the album Where Did Our Love Go
- B-side: "Standing at the Crossroads of Love"
- Released: October 31, 1963
- Recorded: October 1, 1963
- Studio: Hitsville U.S.A., Detroit
- Genre: R&B, pop
- Length: 2:37 (single version) 3:03 (album version)
- Label: Motown; M 1051
- Songwriter: Holland–Dozier–Holland
- Producers: Lamont Dozier, Brian Holland

The Supremes singles chronology
| "A Breathtaking Guy" (1963) | "When the Lovelight Starts Shining Through His Eyes" (1963) | "Run, Run, Run" (1964) |

Where Did Our Love Go track listing
- 12 tracks Side one: 1. "Where Did Our Love Go"; 2. "Run, Run, Run"; 3. "Baby Love"; 4. "When the Lovelight Starts Shining Through His Eyes"; 5. "Come See About Me"; 6. "Long Gone Lover"; Side two: 7. "I'm Giving You Your Freedom"; 8. "A Breathtaking Guy"; 9. "He Means The World to Me"; 10. "Standing at the Crossroads of Love"; 11. "Your Kiss of Fire"; 12. "Ask Any Girl"

"When the Lovelight Starts Shining Through His Eyes" is a song written by Holland–Dozier–Holland and recorded in 1963 by the Motown singing group the Supremes. It is notable as the Supremes' first Billboard Hot 100 Top 40 recording, following seven previous singles between January 1961 and September 1963 which failed to enter the Top 40. The single is also notable as the first Supremes single written and produced by Holland–Dozier–Holland, who had previously created hits for Martha and the Vandellas and Mary Wells.

== Overview ==
=== Recording ===
By 1963, the Supremes were struggling to find a pop hit. Until then, the Supremes was a regional R&B favorite, with their most successful single being "A Breathtaking Guy", which peaked at number 75 on the Hot 100. The group's competitors inside Motown included The Marvelettes, Motown's first successful female group, but also with Martha and the Vandellas, whose early hits included "(Love Is Like A) Heat Wave" and "Quicksand". Outside of Motown, competitors included such the duo of Jerry Leiber and Mike Stoller from New York and Phil Spector of Los Angeles.

Struggling to find producers who could give the Supremes a successful hit after both he and Smokey Robinson had failed, Motown CEO Berry Gordy decided to have the team of Holland–Dozier–Holland, who would end up being the dominant songwriting and producing team of Motown, produce a song for the Supremes. Holland-Dozier-Holland responded with "When the Lovelight Starts Shining Through His Eyes", a song that was both modeled after and crafted as a response to Spector's Wall of Sound production methods. "Lovelight" would eventually be released after Gordy's Quality Control Department approved of the song.

=== Reception ===
Released on October 31, 1963, "When the Lovelight Starts Shining Through His Eyes" was the Supremes' first Top 40 pop hit since signing with Motown in 1961. It reached number 23 on the Billboard Hot 100 and number 2 on the Cash Box R&B chart. Cash Box described it as "a bright, happy-go-lucky thumper...that the crew drives out in dandy, 'Mickey’s Monkey'-beat style." Due to its success, Gordy decided to have Holland-Dozier-Holland on board as the group's sole producers from then on. It also nearly made the Top 30 in Australia. After the unsuccessful rush-release of the Phil Spector-inspired "Run, Run, Run", the Supremes would eventually eclipse their female peers after releasing "Where Did Our Love Go" in the summer of 1964.

Allmusic critic William Ruhlmann stated that the song "has many of the elements that would contribute to the group's amazing string of major hits between 1964 and 1967, including a massive drum sound augmented with handclaps, driving music anchored by a saxophone, and Diana Ross' keening voice." Ruhlmann attributed the relative lack of success compared to later Supremes hit to a less "streamlined sound" and to perhaps being "too busy, with the glorified 'Bo Diddley' beat of the verses changing to a more regular one for the choruses and a mix of instruments that sometimes overwhelmed the singers."

== Personnel ==
- Lead vocals by Diana Ross
- Background vocals by Florence Ballard and Mary Wilson
- Additional vocals (growling before instrumental) by the Four Tops (Levi Stubbs, Abdul "Duke" Fakir, Lawrence Payton and Renaldo "Obie" Benson) and Holland–Dozier–Holland (Edward "Eddie" Holland Jr., Lamont Dozier and Brian Holland)
- Instrumentation by the Funk Brothers
  - Earl Van Dyke – piano
  - Johnny Griffith – organ
  - Robert White – guitar
  - Eddie Willis – guitar
  - Joe Messina – guitar
  - James Jamerson – bass
  - Benny Benjamin – drums
  - Jack Ashford – percussion
  - Mike Terry – baritone saxophone
- Written by Holland–Dozier–Holland
- Produced by Lamont Dozier and Brian Holland

== Chart history ==
=== Weekly charts ===
| Chart (1963–1964) | Peak position |
|---|---|
| Australia (Kent Music Report) | 24 |
| US Billboard Hot 100 | 23 |
| US Hot R&B/Hip-Hop Songs (Billboard) | 2 |
| US Cashbox Top 100 | 20 |
| US Cashbox R&B | 2 |

=== Year-end charts ===
| Chart (1964) | Rank |
|---|---|
| US Cashbox R&B | 24 |

== Later Versions ==
Dusty Springfield included the song on her 1964 debut album A Girl Called Dusty.

The Zombies did a version in 1965 (available on Live At The BBC, released 2003)

In 1975, Motown Records released a new version of the song (catalog number 1334) by The Boones, a vocal quartet featuring four daughters of Pat Boone (including Debby of "You Light Up My Life" fame). This version reached No. 25 on Billboard magazine's Adult Contemporary chart.

The Seattle-based electro-pop band Brite Futures included this song on their 2012 posthumous album "When The Lights Go Out".
