= Where Did Our Love Go (album) =

1964 album by The Supremes

Studio album by the Supremes
- Released: August 31, 1964
- Recorded: December 28, 1962 – August 13, 1964
- Studios: Hitsville U.S.A., Detroit
- Genres: Pop-soul; doo-wop; R&B
- Length: 30:56
- Label: Motown
- Producers: Brian Holland; Lamont Dozier; Smokey Robinson; Norman Whitfield; Robert Gordy

The Supremes chronology
Meet The Supremes (1962)	Where Did Our Love Go (1964)	A Bit of Liverpool (1964)

Singles from Where Did Our Love Go
- 1. "A Breathtaking Guy" Released: June 12, 1963; 2. "When the Lovelight Starts Shining Through His Eyes" Released: October 31, 1963; 3. "Run, Run, Run" Released: February 7, 1964; 4. "Where Did Our Love Go" Released: June 17, 1964; 5. "Baby Love" Released: September 17, 1964; 6. "Come See About Me" Released: October 27, 1964

Professional ratings
Review scores
Source	Rating
AllMusic	4.5/5 stars
The Encyclopedia of Popular Music	2/5 stars
Tom Hull	B+

Where Did Our Love Go is the second studio album by Motown singing group the Supremes, released in 1964. The album includes several of the group's singles and B-sides from 1963 and 1964. Included are the group's first Billboard Pop Singles number-one hits, "Where Did Our Love Go", "Baby Love", and "Come See About Me", as well as their first Top 40 hit, "When the Lovelight Starts Shining Through His Eyes", and the singles "A Breathtaking Guy" and "Run, Run, Run".

== Track listing ==
All tracks written by Holland–Dozier–Holland except as noted.

=== Side one ===
1. "Where Did Our Love Go" - 2:33
2. "Run, Run, Run" - 2:16
3. "Baby Love" - 2:39
4. "When the Lovelight Starts Shining Through His Eyes" - 3:05
5. "Come See About Me" - 2:44
6. "Long Gone Lover" (Smokey Robinson) - 2:27

=== Side two ===
1. "I'm Giving You Your Freedom" - 2:40
2. "A Breathtaking Guy" (Robinson) - 2:25
3. "He Means the World to Me" (Norman Whitfield) - 2:00
4. "Standing at the Crossroads of Love" - 2:27
5. "Your Kiss of Fire" (Robert Gordy, Harvey Fuqua) - 2:48
6. "Ask Any Girl" - 3:00

=== 2004 Expanded CD bonus tracklist ===
1. "This Is It" (Faye Hale) ^{****}
2. "I'm The Exception To The Rule" (Whitfield) ^{**}
3. "Everyday I'll Love You More Than Yesterday" (Robinson, Claudette Rogers Robinson) ^{*}
4. "Beginning To The Ending" (George Fowler) ^{*****}
5. "Mr. Blues" (Robinson) ^{*}
6. "Come On Boy" (Berry Gordy, Jr.) ^{***}
7. "Bye Baby" (Gordy) ^{***}
8. "My Imagination" (Richard Parker, Faye Hale) ^{****}
9. "I Idolize You" (Robinson) ^{*}
10. "You're Gonna Come To Me" (Gordy) (Version 4 - Credited as Version "3")
11. "Honey Babe" (Gordy, Stevie Wonder) ^{***}
12. "Penny Pincher"
13. "Let Me Hear You Say (I Love You)" (Andre Williams, Johnny Bristol) ^{********}
14. "Don't Take It Away" (William Weatherspoon, William "Mickey" Stevenson) ^{*******}
15. "Just Call Me" (Ivy Jo Hunter, Stevenson) ^{******}
16. "That's A Funny Way" (Hunter, Stevenson) ^{******}
17. "Stop, Look & Listen" (Ed Cobb) ^{***}
18. "Send Me No Flowers"
19. "Baby Love" (Alternate "early" version)
20. "Introduction/Devil's Den" (Live (Live 1964)
21. "When The Lovelight Starts Shining Through His Eyes" (Live 1964)
22. "A Breathtaking Guy" (Live 1964)
23. "Your Heart Belongs To Me" (Live 1964)
24. "Let Me Go The Right Way" (Live 1964)
25. "I Am Woman, You Are Man" (Jule Styne, Bob Merrill) (Live 1964)
26. "People" (Merrill, Styne) (Live 1964)
27. "Where Did Our Love Go" (Live 1964)

== Personnel ==
- Diana Ross, Florence Ballard, and Mary Wilson – lead and background vocals
- The Four Tops, and Holland–Dozier–Holland – background vocals on "When the Lovelight Starts Shining Through His Eyes", "Run, Run, Run" and "Penny Pincher"
- The Love-Tones – background vocals on "Standing on the Crossroads of Love", "This Is It" and "My Imagination"
- Brian Holland, Lamont Dozier – producers on all tracks except noted below
- Smokey Robinson – producer on "Long Gone Lover" and "A Breathtaking Guy" (and bonus track ^{*})
- Norman Whitfield – producer on "He Means the World to Me" (and bonus track ^{**})
- Robert Gordy – producer on "Your Kiss of Fire"
- Berry Gordy, Jr. – producer on bonus track ^{***}
- Faye Hale – producer on bonus track ^{****}
- George Fowler – producer on bonus track ^{*****}
- Ivy Jo Hunter, William "Mickey" Stevenson – producer on bonus track ^{******}
- William "Mickey" Stevenson – producer on bonus track ^{*******}
- Andre Williams – producer on bonus track ^{********}
- The Funk Brothers – instrumentation
  - Earl Van Dyke – piano on "Where Did Our Love Go", "Baby Love" and "Come See About Me"
  - Robert White – guitar on "Where Did Our Love Go"
  - Eddie Willis – guitar on "Where Did Our Love Go" and "Baby Love"
  - Joe Messina – guitar on "Come See About Me"
  - James Jamerson – bass on "Where Did Our Love Go", "Baby Love" and "Come See About Me"
  - Richard "Pistol" Allen – drums on "Where Did Our Love Go" and "Baby Love"
  - Uriel Jones – drums on "Come See About Me"
  - Jack Ashford – vibraphone on "Where Did Our Love Go", "Baby Love" and "Come See About Me"
  - Andrew "Mike" Terry – baritone saxophone on "Where Did Our Love Go", "Baby Love" and "Come See About Me"
  - Hank Cosby – tenor saxophone on "Baby Love" and "Come See About Me"
  - Mike Valvano – footstomps on "Where Did Our Love Go", "Baby Love" and "Come See About Me"
- Bernard Yeszin, Wallace Mead – cover design

== Singles history ==
- "A Breath Taking, First Sight Soul Shaking, One Night Love Making, Next Day Heart Breaking Guy" b/w "(The Man with the) Rock And Roll Banjo Band" (from The Supremes Sing Country, Western and Pop) (Motown 1044, June 12, 1963, reissued immediately with A-side title shortened to "A Breath Taking Guy")
- "When The Lovelight Starts Shining Through His Eyes" b/w "Standing at the Crossroads of Love" (Motown 1051, October 31, 1963)
- "Run, Run, Run" b/w "I'm Giving You Your Freedom" (Motown 1054, February 7, 1964)
- "Where Did Our Love Go" b/w "He Means the World to Me" (Motown 1060, June 17, 1964)
- "Baby Love" b/w "Ask Any Girl" (Motown 1066, September 17, 1964)
- "Come See About Me" b/w "You're Gone, But Always in My Heart" (on The Supremes Sing Holland–Dozier–Holland) (Motown 1068, October 27, 1964)

== Chart history ==
=== Weekly charts ===
Chart (1964–1965)	Peak position
German Albums (Offizielle Top 100)	33
US Billboard 200	2
US Top R&B/Hip-Hop Albums (Billboard)	1

=== Year-end charts ===
Chart (1965)	Rank
US Billboard Top LPs	18
US Cashbox Top 100	4
Chart (1966)	Rank
US Billboard Top LPs	81

== See also ==
- List of Billboard number-one R&B albums of the 1960s
