= A Breathtaking Guy =

Song by The Supremes

Single by The Supremes

from the album Where Did Our Love Go
- B-side: "(The Man with the) Rock And Roll Banjo Band"
- Released: June 12, 1963
- Recorded: Hitsville U.S.A. (Studio A); 1962
- Genre: R&B, pop
- Length: 2:26
- Label: Motown; M 1044
- Songwriter: Smokey Robinson
- Producer: Smokey Robinson

The Supremes singles chronology
"My Heart Can't Take It No More" (1963)	"A Breathtaking Guy" (1963)	"When the Lovelight Starts Shining Through His Eyes" (1963)

Where Did Our Love Go track listing
- 12 tracks Side one: 1. "Where Did Our Love Go"; 2. "Run, Run, Run"; 3. "Baby Love"; 4. "When the Lovelight Starts Shining Through His Eyes"; 5. "Come See About Me"; 6. "Long Gone Lover"; Side two: 7. "I'm Giving You Your Freedom"; 8. "A Breathtaking Guy"; 9. "He Means The World to Me"; 10. "Standing at the Crossroads of Love"; 11. "Your Kiss of Fire"; 12. "Ask Any Girl"

"A Breathtaking Guy"

Single by The Marvelettes

from the album Return of the Marvelettes
- B-side: "You're the One for Me Bobby"
- Released: 1972
- Recorded: Hitsville U.S.A., Golden World; 1970
- Genre: Soul
- Label: Tamla; T 54213
- Songwriter: Smokey Robinson
- Producer: Smokey Robinson

The Marvelettes singles chronology
"Marionette" / "After All" (1970)	"A Breathtaking Guy" (1972)

"A Breathtaking Guy" is a 1963 song written and produced by Smokey Robinson and released first by Motown singing group The Supremes (1963) and later by The Marvelettes (1972). The single was originally released under the title "A Breath Taking, First Sight Soul Shaking, One Night Love Making, Next Day Heartbreaking Guy" by The Supremes, but was shortened after its official release. All three Supremes members - Diana Ross, Florence Ballard and Mary Wilson - sang the chorus with the original title together.

Diana: Are you just a breathtaking...
Florence: First sight soul-shaking...
Diana: One night love-making...
Mary: Next day heartbreaking...
Group: ...Guy?

== Overview ==
One of the rare singles to feature the Supremes singing all lead vocals, it also was their highest charting single at this point, reaching number 75 on the Billboard Hot 100. The group was jokingly referred to at this time as the "no-hit Supremes" by the Motown staff. However, their next single, "When the Lovelight Starts Shining Through His Eyes", would break the group's "no-hit" streak. It would also mean that, with the exception of Ballard's and Wilson's ad-libs on the 1964 single "Baby Love", this would be the last time any member other than Ross would have a lead part on a single for the rest of the decade.

Much like their earlier single, "Your Heart Belongs to Me", Smokey Robinson produced the song with the same sound that had provided hit singles for early Motown star Mary Wells. The Supremes would sing background for Wells on her hit "You Lost the Sweetest Boy" with The Temptations. This would be the last single Robinson would produce for the group until 1969; this is due to the production team of Holland–Dozier–Holland having a very strong hold on the Supremes' released material from late 1963 to early 1968.

In 1972, song was issued as the final single credited to The Marvelettes. The single failed to chart.

== Personnel ==
=== The Supremes version ===
- Lead and background vocals by Diana Ross (verses; choruses), Florence Ballard and Mary Wilson (choruses)
- Produced and written by Smokey Robinson
- Instrumentation by The Funk Brothers

=== The Marvelettes version ===
- Lead vocals by Wanda Young Rogers
- Background vocals by The Andantes: Jackie Hicks, Marlene Barrow, and Louvain Demps
- Produced and written by Smokey Robinson
- Instrumentation by The Funk Brothers

== Chart history ==
=== The Supremes version ===
Chart (1963)	Peak position
US Billboard Hot 100	75
US Cashbox Top 100	75
