= Evolution (Dennis Coffey album) =

Studio album by Dennis Coffey and the Detroit Guitar Band
- Released: 1971
- Recorded: 1971 GM Studio, Detroit, Michigan
- Genres: Soul, funk
- Length: 32:50
- Label: Sussex
- Producer: Mike Theodore

Dennis Coffey and the Detroit Guitar Band chronology
| Hair and Thangs (1969) | Evolution (1971) | Goin' for Myself (1972) |

Evolution is the second album by session guitarist Dennis Coffey and the Detroit Guitar Band.

== Chart performance ==
Professional ratings
Review scores
| Source | Rating |
|---|---|
| Allmusic | 4/5 stars |

Released in 1971 under the Dennis Coffey and the Detroit Guitar Band banner the album peaked at number thirteen on the Billboard Best Selling Soul LP's and number thirty-six on the Top LP's chart due to the funk instrumental "Scorpio" which peaked at number six on the Billboard Hot 100 chart and number nine on the Billboard Hot Rhythm & Blues Singles chart. In Cashbox the album would reach number thirty-four.

== Track listing ==
All tracks composed by Dennis Coffey; except where indicated

1. "Getting It On" (Dennis Coffey, Mike Theodore) (2:31)
2. "Whole Lot of Love" (Jimmy Page, John Bonham, John Paul Jones, Robert Plant) (2:33)
3. "Summertime Girl" (3:06)
4. "Scorpio" (4:20)
5. "Garden of the Moon" (3:23)
6. "Impressions Of" (4:48)
7. "Sad Angel" (3:40)
8. "Big City Funk" (Dennis Coffey, Mike Theodore) (2:55)
9. "Wind Song" (2:44)
10. "Good Time Rhythm and Blues" (2:44)

== Personnel ==
- Dennis Coffey - alto guitar, sitar
- Joe Podorsek - baritone guitar
- Ray Monette - tenor guitar
- Bob Babbitt - bass guitar
- Uriel Jones, Pistol Allen - drums
- Earl Van Dyke - keyboards
- Eddie "Bongo" Brown - congas
- Jack Ashford - tambourine

== Charts ==
| Chart (1972) | Peak position |
|---|---|
| Billboard Top LP's | 36 |
| Billboard Best-Selling Soul LP's | 13 |
| Cashbox 100 Top Albums | 34 |

=== Singles ===
| Year | Single | Chart positions | |
| Year | Single | US Pop Singles | US Soul Singles |
|---|---|---|---|
| 1971 | "Scorpio" | 6 (1972) | 9 |
| 1972 | "Getting It On" | 93 | - |

== Samples & Covers ==
- Public Enemy sampled "Getting It On" on their song "You're Gonna Get Yours" on their album Yo! Bum Rush the Show in 1987.
- Public Enemy sampled "Scorpio" on their song "Night of the Living Baseheads" on their album It Takes a Nation of Millions to Hold Us Back in 1988.
- LL Cool J sampled "Scorpio" on his song "Jingling Baby" on his album Walking with a Panther in 1989.
- Queen Latifah sampled "Scorpio" on her song "Mama Gave Birth To The Soul Children" on her album All Hail the Queen in 1989.
- Young MC sampled "Scorpio" on his song "Bust a Move" on his album Stone Cold Rhymin' in 1989.
- Geto Boys sampled "Scorpio" on their song "Do it Like a G.O." on their albums Grip It! On That Other Level in 1989 and The Geto Boys in 1990.
- Lord Finesse & DJ Mike Smooth sampled "Scorpio" on their song "Keep It Flowing" on their album Funky Technician in 1990.
- House of Pain sampled "Scorpio" on their song "All My Love" on their album House of Pain in 1992.
