= Run, Run, Run (The Supremes song) =

1964 single by The Supremes

Single by The Supremes

from the album Where Did Our Love Go
- B-side: "I'm Giving You Your Freedom"
- Released: February 7, 1964
- Recorded: Hitsville U.S.A. (Studio A); 1963
- Genre: R&B, rock, pop
- Length: 2:14 (album version) 2:21 (single version)
- Label: Motown; M 1054
- Songwriter(s): Holland–Dozier–Holland
- Producer(s): Lamont Dozier, Brian Holland

The Supremes singles chronology
"When the Lovelight Starts Shining Through His Eyes" (1963)	"Run, Run, Run" (1964)	"Where Did Our Love Go" (1964)

Where Did Our Love Go track listing
- 12 tracks Side one: 1. "Where Did Our Love Go"; 2. "Run, Run, Run"; 3. "Baby Love"; 4. "When the Lovelight Starts Shining Through His Eyes"; 5. "Come See About Me"; 6. "Long Gone Lover"; Side two: 7. "I'm Giving You Your Freedom"; 8. "A Breathtaking Guy"; 9. "He Means The World to Me"; 10. "Standing at the Crossroads of Love"; 11. "Your Kiss of Fire"; 12. "Ask Any Girl"

"Run, Run, Run" is a 1964 song written by Holland–Dozier–Holland and released as a single by Motown singing group The Supremes. After a couple of years of unsuccessful singles, the Supremes had finally broken through with a Top 40 single (23) in December 1963 with "When the Lovelight Starts Shining Through His Eyes". On the heels of its release, Motown rush-released a second HDH single titled "Run, Run, Run". Inspired by the sounds of Phil Spector and his Wall of Sound, it was an attempt to give the Supremes a poppier sound compared to their earlier heavy R&B recordings. Billboard described the song as a "strong follow up" to "When the Lovelight Starts Shining Through His Eyes," stating that it "has tough beat in a middle up groove that's great for dancing." Cash Box described it as "a pulsating, big sounding rocker with some torrid triplet keyboard work backing up."

The single peaked at number 93 on the Billboard Hot 100 and number 22 on the Cash Box R&B chart. The Supremes would eventually escape the shadow of their so-called "no-hit" past with their next single "Where Did Our Love Go".

== Personnel ==
- Lead vocals by Diana Ross
- Background vocals by Florence Ballard, Mary Wilson, Holland–Dozier–Holland and The Four Tops
- Instrumentation by The Funk Brothers

== Chart history ==
Chart (1964)	Peak position
US Billboard Hot 100	93
US Hot R&B/Hip-Hop Songs (Billboard)	22
US Cashbox Top 100	86
US Cashbox R&B	22
