= Scorpio (instrumental) =

Single by Dennis Coffey and the Detroit Guitar Band

from the album Evolution
- B-side: "Sad Angel"
- Released: September 1971
- Genre: R&B
- Length: 3:59
- Label: Sussex
- Songwriter: Dennis Coffey
- Producer: Mike Theodore

Dennis Coffey and the Detroit Guitar Band singles chronology
"It's Your Thing" (1969)	"Scorpio" (1971)	"Taurus" (1972)

"Scorpio" is a song by Dennis Coffey and the Detroit Guitar Band. It charted at number 6 on the Billboard Hot 100.

The song has been sampled in many hip-hop songs since its release in 1971, most notably Mark Ronson's debut single "Ooh Wee", Public Enemy's "Night of the Living Baseheads", LL Cool J's "Jingling Baby", and Young MC's "Bust a Move".

In 2016, it was featured in the American television drama series Better Call Saul in the episode "Inflatable". The song is played over a montage of lawyer Saul Goodman/Jimmy McGill (played by Bob Odenkirk) as he attempts to get himself fired.

== Background ==
"Scorpio" was written by Dennis Coffey for his sophomore album Evolution. The guitar line which begins the record actually consists of nine guitar riffs overdubbed on top of one another, spanning three octaves.

It features Coffey on rhythm guitar; Rare Earth's Ray Monette and Joe Podorsek from the Detroit Guitar Band on guitar; Uriel Jones and Richard "Pistol" Allen on drums; Bob Babbitt on bass; "Bongo" Eddie Brown on congas; Jack Ashford on tambourine; and Earl Van Dyke on piano. Bob Babbitt and Eddie "Bongo" Brown perform solos. It was written by Dennis Coffey, produced by Mike Theodore, and arranged by both. Jim Burzzese directed recording, which took place at GM Recording Studios in East Detroit. Ray Hall was in charge of mixing, which took place in RCA Recording Studios in New York City.

The song charted at number 6 on the Billboard Hot 100 and number 9 on R&B Singles. It was Coffey's largest hit; his follow-up "Taurus" peaked at number 18 and number 55 in Canada. No further Coffey single peaked higher than number 93.

== Reception ==
NPR said that "as a distinctive mix of Afro-Latin rhythm and Motor City psyche, it's hard to imagine a more impeccably matched creation".

The song would later be sampled in several hip-hop records: Public Enemy on their song "Night of the Living Baseheads" on their album It Takes a Nation of Millions to Hold Us Back in 1988; LL Cool J on his song "Jingling Baby" on his album Walking with a Panther in 1989; Queen Latifah on her song "Mama Gave Birth To The Soul Children" on her album All Hail the Queen in 1989; Young MC on his song "Bust A Move (song)" on his album Stone Cold Rhymin' in 1989; Geto Boys on their song "Do it Like a G.O." on their albums Grip It! On That Other Level in 1989 and The Geto Boys in 1990; Lord Finesse & DJ Mike Smooth on their song "Keep It Flowing" on their album Funky Technician in 1990; House of Pain on their song "All My Love" on their album House of Pain in 1992 and Mark Ronson on his song "Ooh Wee" from his album Here Comes the Fuzz in 2003.

== Chart performance ==
=== Weekly charts ===
Chart (1971-1972)	Peak position
Canada Top Singles (RPM)	13
US Billboard Best Selling Soul Singles	9
US Billboard Hot 100	6
US Cash Box Top 100	4

=== Year-end charts ===
Chart (1972)	Rank
US Billboard Hot 100	43
US Cash Box Top 100	27
