= Peter Miller (musician) =

- Also known as: Big Boy Pete, Buzz
- Born: Peter Richard Miller; 26 May 1942 (age 83); Norwich, England
- Years active: 1960s–present
- Label: .22 Records
- Formerly of: Peter Jay and the Jaywalkers
- Website: bigboypete.com

Peter Richard Miller (born 26 May 1942 in Norwich, England), also known as Big Boy Pete and Buzz, is an English singer, songwriter, recording engineer and record producer.

Born in Norwich, England, he has lived in San Francisco since 1972. He is a veteran of the 1960s English pop music, starting out with a rock & roll band called the Offbeats, who recorded an EP in 1958, and joining the group Peter Jay & the Jaywalkers in 1961.

He has toured with The Beatles, The Rolling Stones, and most of the rest of the British Invasion. A copy of his "Cold Turkey" sold for £250 at Sotheby's Rock and Roll auction in London.

His 1965 record "Baby I Got News for You" on the Gramophone Company's Columbia label is also a sought-after collector's item. David Wells, owner of the British archival Tenth Planet record label has released four albums of Miller's 1960s music. They have been released by Dionysus Records and Gear Fab Records in the U.S. Recent releases are also on Raucous Records and Double Crown records. His recording studio in San Francisco recorded the early San Francisco punk scene. Miller is also the founder and CEO of the Audio Institute of America, an online recording engineer school which has taught thousands of students from more than 130 countries around the world.

His debut novel, The Ice Cream Man, was released by Stark House Press in 2023.

== Discography ==
Peter Miller & the Offbeats

- 1958 Introducing the Offbeats (EP) Magnegraph Records (Lead Guitar/Songwriter)

Peter Jay and the Jaywalkers

- 1962 "Can Can 62" (single) Decca 11531 (Lead Guitar)
- 1963 "Totem Pole" (single) Decca 11593 (Lead Guitar)
- 1963 "Poet and Peasant" (single) Decca 11659 (Lead Guitar)
- 1964 "Kansas City" (single) Decca 11840 (Lead Guitar/Vocal)
- 1964 "If You Love Me" (single) Decca 11917 (Lead Guitar/Vocal)
- 1964 "Where Did Our Love Go" (single) Piccadilly 35199 (Lead Guitar/Vocal)
- 1964 "Tonight You're Gonna Fall In Love With Me" (single) Piccadilly 35212 (Lead Guitar/Vocal)
- 1965 "Parchman Farm" (single) Piccadilly 35220 (Vocal/Lead Guitar)
- 1965 "Before the Beginning" (single) Piccadilly 35259 (Lead Guitar)

The News

- 1965 "The Entertainer" / "I Count the Tears" (single) Decca 12356 (Lead Guitar)

The Magic Lanterns

- 1966 "Rumpelstiltskin" (single) CBS 202250 (Lead Guitar)

Solo

- 1966 "Baby I Got News For You" / "Girl with the Castle" – Miller (single) Columbia 7972 (Vocal/Lead Guitar/Composer)
- 1968 "Cold Turkey" / "My Love is Like a Spaceship" – Big Boy Pete (single) Camp Records 602005 (Vocal/Lead Guitar/Composer)
- 1974 Music From Little Flint – Pete Miller (album) .22 Records TT2201 (Vocal/Lead Guitar/Composer)
- 1981 Pre C.B.S. – Peter Miller (album) .22 Records TT2202 (Vocal/Lead Guitar/Composer)
- 1986 Rockin' is My Bizness – Peter Miller (album) .22 Records TT2203 (Vocal/Lead Guitar/Composer)
- 1995 "Double Diamonds" – Shig & Buzz (single) Maitai DD0103 (Lead Guitar/Composer)
- 1996 "Good Luck Charm" – Shig & Buzz (single) Sheena Music MCE38 (Lead Guitar/Composer)
- 1996 Homage to Catatonia – Big Boy Pete (album) Tenth Planet TP026 (Vocal/Lead Guitar/Composer)
- 1997 Summerland – Peter Miller (album) Tenth Planet TP030 (Vocal/Lead Guitar/Composer)
- 1998 Return to Catatonia – Big Boy Pete (album) Tenth Planet TP035 (Vocal/Lead Guitar/Composer)
- 1999 "Me" / "Nasty Nazi" – Big Boy Pete (single) 3 Acre Floor Records 3eeAC05 (Vocal/Lead Guitar/Composer)
- 1999 "Psycho-Relics" – Big Boy Pete (single) Bacchus Archives BA 1137 (Vocal/Lead Guitar/Composer)
- 2000 World War IV... A Symphonic Poem – Big Boy Pete (album) Gear Fab Records GF-157(Vocal/Lead Guitar/Composer)
- 2002 London American Boy – Big Boy Pete (album) Raucous Records RAUCD-105 (Vocal/Lead Guitar)
- 2004 The Margetson Demos – Big Boy Pete (album) Gear Fab Records GF-206 (Vocal/Lead Guitar/Composer)
- 2005 Rock-Ola – Bonney & Buzz (album) Double Crown Records DCCD-20 (Lead Guitar/Composer)
- 2006 The Perennial Enigma – Big Boy Pete (album) Angel Air SJPCD-224 (Vocal/Lead Guitar/Composer)
- 2007 Rock It Racket – The Squires of the Subterrain and Big Boy Pete (album) Rocket Racket Records RRCD2112 (Vocal/Lead Guitar)
- 2008 Bang It Again! – Bonney & Buzz (album) Double Crown Records DCCD29 (Guitar)
- 2010 Bark! - Big Boy Pete (CD) .22 Records TT2203-A (Lead Guitar/Composer)
- 2010 Winklepickin - Big Boy Pete and the Offbeats skiffle group (CD) .22 Records TT2204 (Guitar/Banjo//Vocals/Composer)
- 2012 Merry Skifflemas! - Big Boy Pete and Hilton Valentine (CD) .22 Records TT2205 (Vocals/Guitar/Composer)
- 2012 Play Rough - Bonney & Buzz (CD) Double Crown Records DCCD 47 (Guitars/Composer)
- 2013 Hitmen - Big Boy Pete and The Squire (CD) Rocket Racket Records RRCD221 (Vocals/Guitars/Composer)
- 2013 Through The Back Door - Big Boy Pete (CD) 22 Records TT-2206 (Vocals/Guitars/Composer)
- 2016 Miller's Tales - Big Boy Pete (DVD) 22 Records TT-2207 (Vocals/Guitars/Composer)

Songwriting

- 1965 "Spectre" – on Sounds Orchestral Meets James Bond (album) Piccadilly 38016 (Composer)
- 1966 "Stop!" – The Knack (single) Polydor 602005 (Composer)
- 1967 "Stop!" – Dan et Vanny (single) Barclay 71080 (Composer)
- 1966 "The Baby Song" – Boz (single) Columbia 7735 (Composer)
- 1968 "Playboy" – Freddie and the Dreamers (single) Columbia 7929 (Composer)
- 2010 Be Dreamers - Kelley Stoltz (CD) Sub Pop Records SP890 (Guitar/Composer/Producer of one track)

Other

- 1962 "Ever Since You Said Goodbye" – Marty Wilde (single) Philips 326546 (Lead Guitar)
- 1979 "I Hate Disco Music" – The Sides (single) Loral (Backing Vocalist)
- 2002 Strawberries on Sunday – The Squires of the Subterrain (album) Rocket Racket Records RRCD-210 (co-producer)
- 2002 Big Boy Pete Treats – The Squires of the Subterrain (album) Rocket Racket Records RRCD-209 (Composer/Producer)
