= Great Yarmouth Hippodrome =

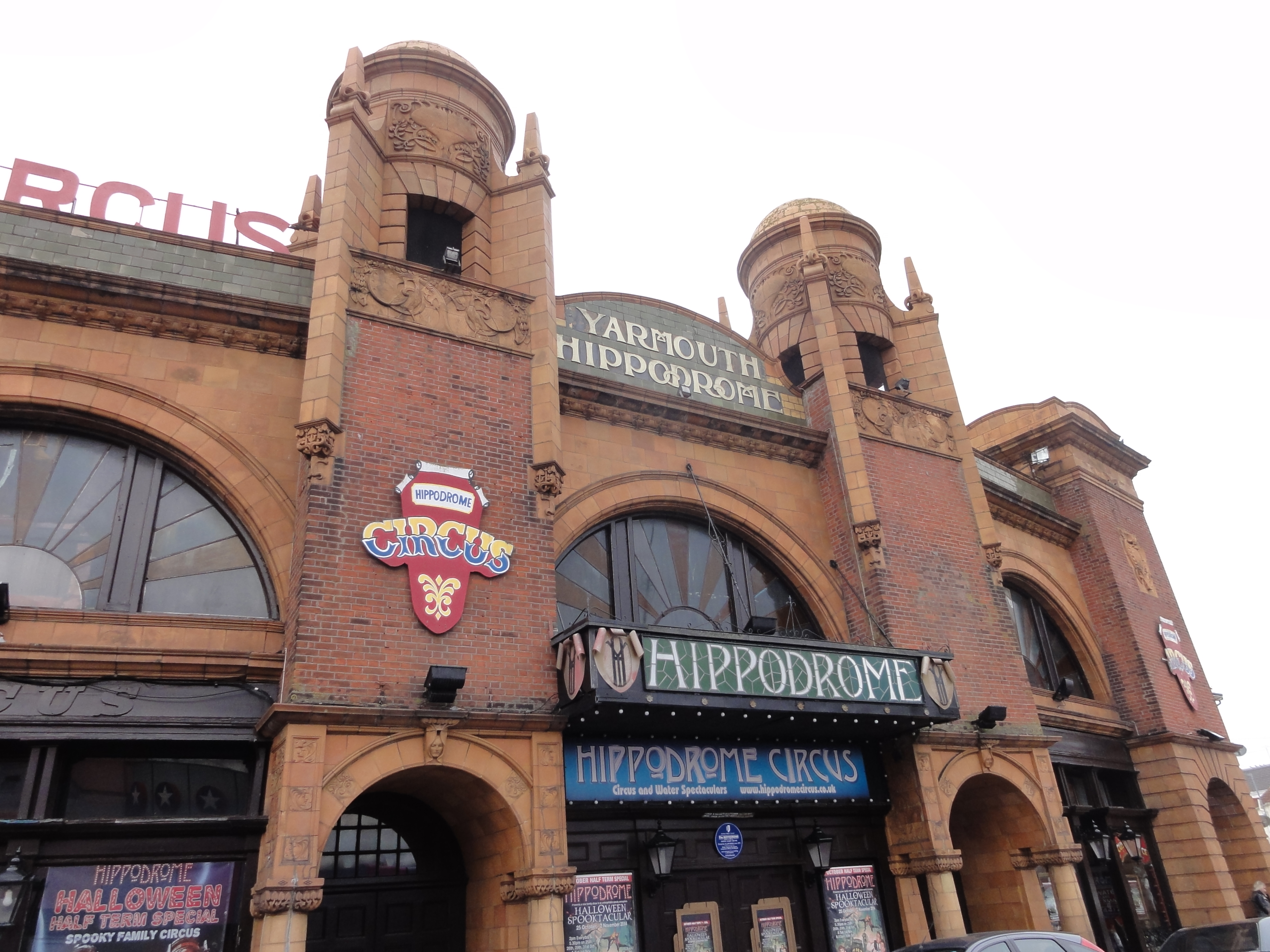
- Interactive map of Great Yarmouth Hippodrome
- 52.6028°N 1.7355°E
- Location: Great Yarmouth, England

History
- Founded: 20th century
- Built: 1903

Site notes
- Architect: R S Cockrill
- Architectural style: Art Nouveau

Listed Building – Grade II*
- Official name: The Hippodrome
- Designated: 8 December 1978

The Great Yarmouth Hippodrome is a circus building in Great Yarmouth, England that was built in 1903. Peter Jay bought the building in 1979, and the Jay family continue to produce Circus Spectaculars four times a year, with Jack Jay as ringmaster and producer and Ben Jay as manager.

== History ==
The Hippodrome Circus in Great Yarmouth was built by the showman George Gilbert in 1903 and designed by architect Ralph Scott Cockrill. It is one of only two purpose-built permanent circuses in England still in operation, and one of only three in the world with a circus floor that sinks into a pool.

It is a concrete construction with brick and terracotta facing. Its facade consists of three bays with two towers including Art Nouveau relief foliage patterns in the arched side panels. The main cornice has a frieze of carved owls.

Billy Russell's Hippodrome Circus was a series of three TV programs broadcast by the BBC from Great Yarmouth in July, August and September 1962. The circus director was Roberto Germains and the programs were introduced by Peter West.

== Now ==
Peter Jay bought the building in 1979, restoring the circus floor that sinks into a water feature in 1981 when he presented his first show.

The Jay family continue to produce Circus Spectaculars four times a year, with Jack Jay as ringmaster and producer and Ben Jay as manager.

== Wrestling ==
The Hippodrome was a frequent venue for professional wrestling, hosting shows by both Joint Promotions and opposition promoters. In 1980, wrestler/promoter Jackie Pallo taped a show at the venue as a home video release and also as an audition tape for possible ITV coverage. Veteran heel King Kong Kirk died of a heart attack on 23 August 1987 after collapsing in the ring at the venue during a tag team match pitting himself and King Kendo (Bill Clarke) against Big Daddy (Shirley Crabtree) and Greg Valentine (Steve Crabtree) in front of 1,500 people.
