= Nella Dodds =

American soul singer (born 1950)

- Born: Donzella Petty-John; January 25, 1950 (age 76); Havre de Grace, Maryland, U.S.
- Genres: Soul, R&B, Northern soul
- Occupation: Singer
- Label: Wand

Donzella Petty-John, known professionally as Nella Dodds (born January 25, 1950) is an American soul singer. Born in Havre de Grace, Maryland, United States, she recorded six released singles for Wand Records between 1964 and 1966. Her records are popular on the Northern soul scene.

== Singles ==
- "Come See About Me" / "You Don't Love Me Anymore" – 1964 (Wand 167) Reached number 74 in Billboard chart, November 28, 1964
- "Finders Keepers, Losers Weepers" / "A Girl's Life" – 1964 (Wand 171) Reached number 96 in Billboard chart, January 16, 1965
- "Your Love Back" / "P's And Q's" – 1965 (Wand 178)
- "Come Back Baby" / "Dream Boy" – 1965 (Wand 187)
- "Gee Whiz" / "Maybe Baby" – 1966 (Wand 1111)
- "Honey Boy" / "I Just Gotta Have You" – 1966 (Wand 1136)

== "Come See About Me" ==
The Supremes, while being the first to record "Come See About Me", were not the first to issue it as a single. That distinction fell to Dodds, and her version started selling, climbing to No. 74 on the Billboard Hot 100, but Motown quickly released the Supremes' version as a single, which killed sales of Dodds's version.

== Compilation album – This is a Girl's Life ==
Although Dodds was scheduled to have a vinyl album released in the mid-1960s, it was never released. "This Is A Girl's Life" includes all 12 tracks released as singles plus an additional three that were not released at the time. The tracks were recorded for Philadelphia's Dyno-Dynamic Productions (leased by New York's Wand label) between 1964 and 1966. The CD was released in 2007.

1. "Come Back Baby" – (James Bishop, Kenny Gamble)
2. "A Girl's Life" – (Luther Randolph)
3. "P's and Q's" – (James Bishop, Weldon McDougal, Luther Randolph, John Stiles)
4. "Finders Keepers, Losers Weepers" – (Kenny Gamble)
5. "Honey Boy" – (Eddie Holland, Lamont Dozier, Brian Holland)
6. "You Don't Love Me Anymore" – (Kenny Gamble)
7. "Dream Boy" – (Arrett Keefer, Frank Virtuoso)
8. "First Date" – (James Bishop)
9. "One Love Not Two" – (Nick Stokes, Alonzo Willis)
10. "Whisper You Love Me Boy" – (Eddie Holland, Lamont Dozier, Brian Holland)
11. "Your Love Back" – (Roy Alfred, Wes Farrell)
12. "Gee Whiz" – (Carla Thomas)
13. "Maybe Baby" – (James Bishop, Weldon McDougal, Luther Randolph, John Stiles, Kenny Gamble)
14. "Come See About Me" – (Eddie Holland, Lamont Dozier, Brian Holland)
15. "I Just Gotta Have You" – (Kenny Gamble)

== Acting career ==
She received her acting training from The Zarro Acting Academy, Norfolk, Virginia. She received additional training with Sylvia Harman of The Actor's Place in Virginia Beach, Virginia where she focused on The Meisner Technique as well as with Tom Logan, national and international director and acting coach, of Los Angeles, California.

- Sweet Good Fortune – as Thelma Little (2006)
- Evan Almighty as – Congressperson (2007)
