= Dennis Coffey =

American guitarist

- Born: Dennis James Coffey; November 11, 1940 (age 85); Detroit, Michigan, U.S.
- Genres: Funk rock; funk; psychedelic rock; jazz-funk
- Occupation: Musician
- Instrument: Guitar
- Years active: 1955–present
- Labels: Maverick; Sussex; Westbound
- Formerly of: The Funk Brothers; Dennis Coffey & the Detroit Guitar Band; Gallery
- Website: denniscoffeysite.com

Dennis James Coffey (born November 11, 1940) is an American guitarist. He was a studio musician for many soul and R&B recordings, and is well known for his 1971 Top 10 hit single "Scorpio".

== Biography ==
Coffey learned to play guitar at the age of thirteen, in the Michigan Upper Peninsula town of Copper City. In 1955, as a fifteen-year-old sophomore at Detroit's Mackenzie High School, Dennis played his first record session - backing Vic Gallon in "I'm Gone", on the Gondola record label. In the early 1960s he joined The Royaltones who had had hits with "Poor Boy" in 1958 and "Flamingo Express" in 1961. The Royaltones played sessions with other artists including Del Shannon.

By the late 1960s as a member of the Funk Brothers studio band, Coffey played on dozens of recordings for Motown Records, and introduced a hard rock guitar sound to Motown record producer Norman Whitfield's recordings, including distortion, Echoplex tape-loop delay, and wah-wah: most notably heard on "Cloud Nine", "Ball of Confusion (That's What the World Is Today)", and "Psychedelic Shack" by The Temptations. He played on numerous other hit records of the era: Edwin Starr's "War", Diana Ross & The Supremes' "Someday We'll Be Together", and Freda Payne's "Band of Gold".

In 1971, Coffey recorded "Scorpio" which was a million selling instrumental single that peaked in the US at number nine on the Billboard Hot Soul Singles chart and at number six on the Billboard Hot 100. The instrumental track featured the former Motown "funk brother", Bob Babbitt on bass. On January 8, 1972 Coffey became the first white artist to perform on the television show Soul Train, playing "Scorpio". "Scorpio" received a gold disc awarded by the Recording Industry Association of America on December 9, 1971.

The follow-up in 1972 was "Taurus", both credited to Coffey and the Detroit Guitar Band. It reached #55 in Canada. Since then, he has recorded several solo albums, most of them for the Sussex and Westbound labels. While at Sussex Records Coffey arranged and produced along with Mike Theodore the million selling "Nice To Be With You" by the group Gallery. In addition, Coffey scored the blaxploitation film, Black Belt Jones (1974).

Coffey was interviewed in the 2002 film, Standing in the Shadows of Motown, which told the story of Funk Brothers and explained that he had sold his Fender Stratocaster to buy a Gibson Firebird after he heard Eddie Willis of Funk Brothers play it during a Motown session.

In 2004, he published a memoir, Guitars, Bars and Motown Superstars.

In 2008, he co-produced the Carl Dixon sessions at Studio A, Dearborn Heights, Michigan. Four tracks were recorded featuring some of the Funk Brothers including Uriel Jones, Bob Babbitt, Coffey and Ray Monette, plus other distinguished Detroit session musicians. Spyder Turner, Pree and Gayle Butts were vocalists on the session. The session was arranged by David J. Van De Pitte.

On April 26, 2011 (April 25 outside the US) Coffey released his self-titled album, consisting of new songs and new versions of songs which originally featured Coffey's distinctive guitar work. Promotion for the album included an international tour, kicking off with several appearances at SXSW. Singer-songwriter Kendra Morris accompanied him on tour, performing backing vocals.

Dennis was a constant performer in his hometown Detroit. He performed at the Detroit Jazz Concert, the Concert of Colors promoted by Don Was and recorded on the Blue Note label. His performances at the Legendary Morey Baker's Keyboard Lounge and other venues included notables; Steve Adams, Drew Schultz, Danny Tyrell and others.

In 2012, Coffey was interviewed on the PBS program History Detectives, about the authenticity of an old Ampeg B-15 amplifier with the stenciled name of fellow Funk Brothers member bassist James Jamerson.

Along with Mike Theodore, Coffey discovered the folk-rock singer-songwriter Sixto Rodriguez, who is the subject of the 2012 Oscar-winning film Searching for Sugar Man in which Coffey appears. Coffey played lead guitar on Rodriguez's first album Cold Fact (1970).

Dennis Coffey was inducted into the Michigan Rock and Roll Legends Hall of Fame as a member of the Funk Brothers in 2010 and as a solo artist in 2018.

== Discography ==
=== Albums ===
Year	Album	Chart positions		Record label
Year	Album	US	US R&B	Record label
1969	Hair and Thangs	—	—	Maverick Records
1971	Evolution	36	13	Sussex Records
1972	Goin' for Myself	90	37	Sussex Records
1972	Electric Coffey	189	—	Sussex Records
1973	Dance Party (compilation)	—	—	Sussex Records
1974	Instant Coffey	—	—	Sussex Records
1975	Gettin' It On	—	—	Carrere
1975	Finger Lickin' Good	147	31	Westbound Records
1977	Back Home	—	—	Westbound Records
1978	A Sweet Taste of Sin	—	—	Westbound Records
1986	Motor City Magic	—	—	TSR Jazz Records
1989	Under the Moonlight	—	—	Orpheus Records
1996	Flight of the Phoenix	—	—	Fighting Chance
2011	Dennis Coffey	—	—	Strut Records
2016	Hot Coffey in the D (rec. 1968)	—	—	Resonance
2018	One Night at Morey's (rec. 1968)	—	—	Omnivore
2018	Live at Baker's (rec. 2006)	—	—	Omnivore
2019	Down By the River	—	—	Detroit Music Factory
"—" denotes the album failed to chart

=== Singles ===
Year	Title	Chart positions		
Year	Title	US Pop Singles	US Black Singles	US Disco Singles
1969	"It's Your Thing"/"River Rouge"	—	—	—
1971	"Scorpio"	6	9	—
1972	"Taurus"	18	11	—
1972	"Getting It On"	93	—	—
1972	"Ride, Sally, Ride"	93	43	—
1973	"Theme From Enter The Dragon"	—	—	—
1975	"Getting It On '75"	—	75	—
1976	"Finger Lickin' Good"	—	—	14
1977	"Our Love Goes On Forever"	—	94	—
1977	"Wings of Fire"/"Free Spirit"	—	—	11
"—" denotes the single failed to chart

== As sideman ==
- In the Rain - The Dramatics
- Whacha See is Whacha Get - The Dramatics
- Cloud Nine - The Temptations
- Ball of Confusion - The Temptations
- Handy Man - Del Shannon
- I Wanna Testify - The Parliaments
- Nice to be with You - Gallery
- Float on - The Floaters
- Boogie Fever - The Silvers

== Notable publications ==
- Guitars, Bars, and Motown Superstars (University of Michigan Press, 2004)
