= Goin' for Myself =

Studio album by Dennis Coffey
- Released: 1972
- Recorded: 1972 GM Studio, Detroit, Michigan
- Genre: Psychedelic rock; funk rock
- Label: Sussex
- Producer: Mike Theodore

Dennis Coffey chronology
Evolution (1971)	Goin' for Myself (1972)	Electric Coffey (1972)

Professional ratings
Review scores
Source	Rating
Allmusic	3/5 stars

Goin' for Myself is the third album by session guitarist Dennis Coffey.

== Track listing ==
All tracks composed by Dennis Coffey; except where indicated

1. "Taurus" - 3:00
2. "Can You Feel It" - (Mike Theodore, Dennis Coffey) 2:50
3. "Never Can Say Goodbye" - (Clifton Davis ) 4:18
4. "Ride, Sally, Ride" - 3:06
5. "Midnight Blue" - 2:43
6. "Bridge Over Troubled Water" - (Paul Simon) 5:03
7. "Man and Boy (Main Theme)" - (Bill Withers, J.J. Johnson) 2:23
8. "It's Too Late" - (Carole King, Tony Stern) 5:21
9. "Toast and Jam" - 6:14

== Personnel ==
- Dennis Coffey - Guitar
- Bob Babbitt, Tony Newton - Bass
- Andrew Smith - Drums
- Eric Morgeson - Keyboards
- James Barnes - Congas
- Jack Ashford - Tambourine
- Alvin Score, Barbara Fickett, Beatriz Staples, Bob Cowart, Carl Raetz, David Ireland, Felix Resnick, Fred Boldt, Haim Shtrum, Jack Boesen, LeRoy Fenstermacher, Mario DiFiore, Parke Groat, Richard Margitza, Virginia Halfman, Wally Gomulka - Horns, Strings
- Emanuel Johnson, Joyce Vincent, Pam Vincent, Rothwell Wilson, Telma Hopkins, Tyrone Brown - Backing Vocals

== Charts ==
Chart (1972)	Peak position
Billboard Top LPs & Tape	90
Billboard Best-Selling Soul LP's	37

=== Singles ===
The single, "Taurus", reached number eleven on the US Soul Singles chart.

Year	Single	Chart positions	
Year	Single	U.S. Pop Singles	US Soul Singles
1972	"Taurus"	18	11
