= Come See About Me =

1964 single by The Supremes

- Australian single of the Supremes recording

Single by the Supremes

from the album Where Did Our Love Go
- B-side: "You're Gone, But Always in My Heart"; "Long Gone Lover"
- Released: October 27, 1964
- Studio: Hitsville U.S.A., Detroit
- Genre: Pop, R&B
- Length: 2:39
- Label: Motown
- Songwriter: Holland–Dozier–Holland
- Producers: Brian Holland; Lamont Dozier

The Supremes singles chronology
"Baby Love" (1964)	"Come See About Me" (1964)	"Stop! In the Name of Love" (1965)

Videos
- "Come See About Me" (The Ed Sullivan Show) on YouTube
- "Come See About Me" (lyrics) on YouTube

"Come See About Me"
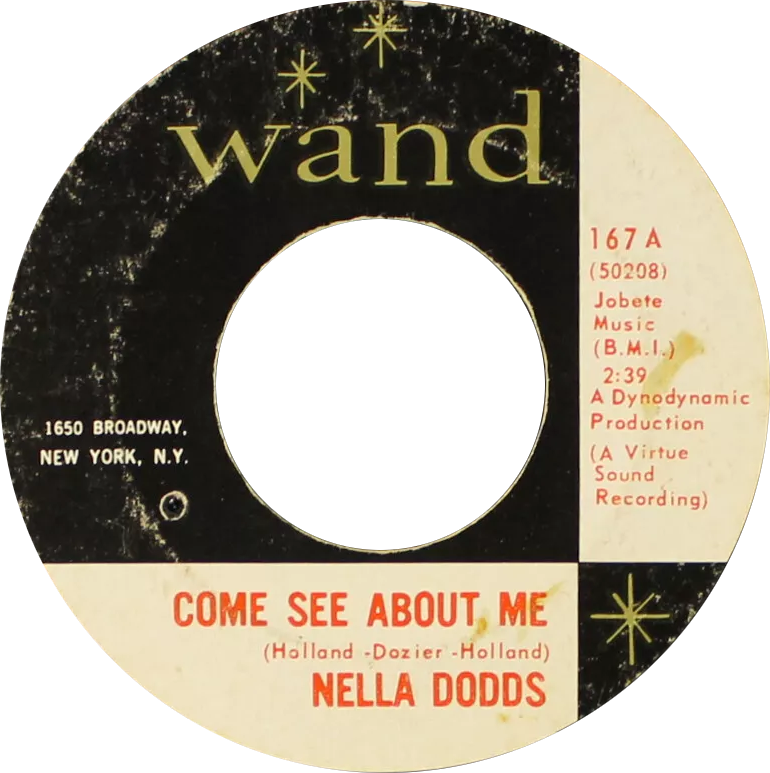
- US single of the Nella Dodds recording

Single by Nella Dodds

from the album This Is a Girl's Life
- B-side: "You Don't Love Me Anymore"
- Released: October 1964
- Length: 3:01
- Label: Wand
- Songwriter: Holland–Dozier–Holland
- Producer: Dyno-dynamic

Nella Dodds singles chronology
"Come See About Me" (1964)	"Finders Keepers, Losers Weepers" (1964)

"Come See About Me" is a 1964 song recorded by the Supremes for the Motown label. The track opens with a fade-in, marking one of the first times the technique had been used on a studio recording.

The song became third of five consecutively released Supremes songs to top the Billboard pop singles chart in the United States (the others being "Where Did Our Love Go", "Baby Love", "Stop! In the Name of Love" and "Back in My Arms Again"). It topped the chart twice, non-consecutively, being toppled by and later replacing the Beatles' "I Feel Fine" in December 1964 and January 1965. The BBC ranked "Come See About Me" at #94 on The Top 100 Digital Motown Chart, which ranks Motown releases by their all time UK downloads and streams.

== History ==
"Come See About Me" was written and produced by Motown's main production team Holland–Dozier–Holland. It was recorded during a two-week period in which the Supremes also cut "Baby Love", after "Where Did Our Love Go" became their most successful single to date. It was #1 on the Billboard Hot 100 chart for two separate weeks: December 13, 1964, to December 18, 1964, and January 10, 1965, to January 16, 1965, and reached #3 on the soul chart.

Billboard said the song has a "pronounced Detroit beat, steady and exacting" and that the "gals weave silky and controlled vocal through beat." Cash Box described it as "a pulsating stomp-a-rhythmic… that the gals carve out in ultra-commercial manner" and in which the group was "in top-of-the-chart form."

The Supremes were the first to record the song, but not the first to issue it as a single. That distinction fell to Nella Dodds: her version climbed to #74 on the Billboard Hot 100, but Motown quickly released the Supremes' version as a single, which killed Dodds' sales. Cash Box described Dodds' version as "an exciting pop-r&b, choral-backed handclap-shuffler about a gal who pleads for her ex-boyfriend to return to her," hailing the singer as "a new talent who promises to be an important wax name in the coming weeks".

The Supremes made their first of 17 appearances live on the CBS variety program The Ed Sullivan Show, performing this single on Sunday, December 27, 1964.

The group also recorded a German version of the song, entitled "Johnny und Joe".

"The words had a real sad weight," observed Bloc Party frontman Kele Okereke, "but the music was bouncy. Great!"

== Personnel ==
- Lead vocals by Diana Ross
- Background vocals by Florence Ballard and Mary Wilson
- All instruments by the Funk Brothers
  - Earl Van Dyke – piano
  - Joe Messina – guitar
  - James Jamerson – bass
  - Uriel Jones – drums
  - Jack Ashford – vibraphone
  - Hank Cosby – tenor saxophone
  - Andrew "Mike" Terry – baritone saxophone
- Footstomps by Mike Valvano

== Charts ==
=== Weekly charts ===
Chart (1964–1965)	Peak position
Australia (Kent Music Report)	78
Belgium (Ultratop 50 Flanders)	20
Canada Top Singles (RPM)	1
Netherlands (Dutch Top 40)	17
New Zealand (Lever Hit Parade)	2
Singapore (Billboard)	1
UK Singles (Official Charts)	27
US Billboard Hot 100	1
US Hot R&B/Hip-Hop Songs (Billboard)	2
US Cash Box Top 100	1
US Cash Box R&B	2
US Record World 100 Top Pops	1
US Record World Top 40 R&B	2

=== Year-end charts ===
Chart (1965)	Rank
Japan Foreign Hits (Billboard)	8
US Cash Box Top 100	8
US Cash Box R&B	21

== Certifications ==
Region	Certification	Certified units/sales
United Kingdom Digital sales and streams only	—	65,000
United States	—	1,000,000

== Other versions ==
UK single of the Jr. Walker & the All Stars recording

- The Supremes recorded a German-language version of the song, titled "Jonny und Joe" as the b-side of the 1965 single "Thank You Darling" (also sung in German) in Germany, Switzerland and the Netherlands. "Jonny und Joe" was later included on two various Motown artists compilation albums Motown Around the World (1987, 1CD) and Motown Around the World: The Classic Singles (2010, 2CD) and also on Diana Ross & the Supremes compilation 50th Anniversary: The Singles Collection 1961–1969 (2011, 3CD).
- In 1967, the song was a repeat hit for Motown act Jr. Walker & the All Stars, whose version reached the top 10 on the R&B chart and the top 25 on the pop chart.
- In 1987, Welsh rock and roll singer Shakin' Stevens covered it on his album Let's Boogie, making it a hit in the UK and Ireland. Shakin' Stevens version surpassed the Supremes' original #27 chart placing by reaching #24.
- In 2012, American musical dramedy Glee featured a cover of this song for its fourth season's Thanksgiving episode. The cover was recorded by Dianna Agron as her character Quinn Fabray with Naya Rivera and Heather Morris providing backup vocals.

== See also ==
- List of Billboard Hot 100 number ones of 1964
- List of Billboard Hot 100 number ones of 1965
