= Peter Jay and the Jaywalkers =

British beat group

- Origin: Norwich, Norfolk, England
- Genres: Rock and roll, instrumental rock, R&B, beat
- Years active: 1960–1967
- Labels: Decca, Piccadilly
- Past members: Peter Jay; Pete "Buzz" Miller; Tony Webster; Ian Saunders; Terrence Hayward; Mac McIntyre; Lloyd Baker; Geoff Moss; Johnny Larke; Terry Reid

Peter Jay and the Jaywalkers were a British instrumental rock group in the early 1960s. Their biggest hit, "Can Can 62" reached the UK singles chart in 1962. The group toured with the Beatles and the Rolling Stones before disbanding in 1966.

== Origins and career ==
The group was formed around 1960 by Peter Jay (b. 29 January 1944, Southgate, North London, England), the son of Jack Jay who owned and managed the Windmill Theatre together with several cinemas and nightclubs in Great Yarmouth, Norfolk, England. Peter Jay formed the group while studying at Norwich College. He played drums; other band members were Pete "Buzz" Miller, Tony Webster (rhythm guitar), Mac McIntyre (tenor sax and flute), Lloyd Baker (piano and baritone sax), Geoff Moss (bass guitar) and Johnny Larke (bass guitar). The band never contained the unusual set-up of an acoustic and electric bass, just two electric basses. From about 1962, the group were also noted for their use of coordinated Vox Phantom guitars on stage.

Peter Jay and the Jaywalkers signed a recording deal with Decca Records in 1962. Their first record, a rocked-up version of the can-can music from Offenbach's Orpheus in the Underworld, produced by Joe Meek at Decca's studios in Hampstead and entitled "Can Can 62", rose to number 31 after entering the UK singles chart in November 1962. The group released several further singles on Decca in 1963 and 1964, but no others became chart hits. The group were a popular live act and were chosen as a support act to the Beatles on their UK tour in November and December 1963, having previously stood in for the Beatles for one night in February 1963 when the Beatles left the Helen Shapiro tour to record their first album in London. They also appeared on national TV shows including Ready Steady Go! and Thank Your Lucky Stars.

The group moved to Piccadilly Records in 1964 and released several further singles, with little commercial success. Miller left in 1965, and was replaced by guitarist Terry Reid. After further personnel changes, and billed as "Peter Jay and the New Jaywalkers", the group continued to appear on bills with leading bands of the time, and were included on a 1966 package tour of the UK with the Rolling Stones, Ike and Tina Turner and the Yardbirds starting at the Royal Albert Hall in September 1966. Following the tour, the group split up.

== Later activities ==
In the late 1970s, Peter Jay, together with his father, purchased the Hippodrome in Great Yarmouth, and gradually restored it as a theatre and circus venue with a circular performing area which could be lowered to reveal a swimming pool. He also took over the lease of the Tower Circus in Blackpool in 1983. Since his father's death in 1985, he has continued to own and manage the Yarmouth Hippodrome. He has also published an autobiography, Jaywalking.

Peter Miller became a solo artist, releasing the single "Baby I Got News for You" (credited as "Miller") in 1965. He then concentrated on songwriting and worked as a session musician, before re-emerging as 'Big Boy Pete' in early 1968 with the single "Cold Turkey", a track which was later anthologised as an example of freakbeat and covered by the Damned. Miller moved to San Francisco in the mid-1970s, and has since recorded with his band, the Wildcats, as well as collaborating with other musicians in ventures such as "Shig & Buzz". Terry Reid continued with a solo career, becoming a singer, songwriter, and guitarist. Reid died of cancer in Rancho Mirage, California, on 4 August 2025, aged 75.

== Discography ==
=== Singles ===
- 1962 "Can-Can 62" / "Redskins" Decca 11531
- 1963 "Totem Pole" / "Jaywalker" Decca 11593
- 1963 "Poet and Peasant" / "Ooh Lala!" Decca 11659
- 1964 "Kansas City" / "The Parade of the Tin Soldiers" Decca 11840
- 1964 "If You Love Me" / "You Girl" Decca 11917
- 1964 "Where Did Our Love Go" / "Caroline" Piccadilly 35199
- 1964 "Tonight You're Gonna Fall In Love With Me" / "Red Cabbage" Piccadilly 35212
- 1965 "Parchman Farm" / "What Two Can Easily Do" Piccadilly 35220
- 1965 "Before the Beginning" / "Solitaire" Piccadilly 35259
- 1967 "The Hand Don't Fit the Glove" / "This Time" (as Terry Reid with Peter Jay's Jaywalkers) Columbia DB 8166

=== Compilation album ===
- 2012 Jaywalkin' (Singles 1962-1965) (RPM Records, RETRO 906 CD)
