= You Lost the Sweetest Boy =

Single by Mary Wells

from the album Mary Wells' Greatest Hits
- A-side: "What's Easy for Two Is So Hard for One"
- Released: 1963
- Recorded: 1963
- Genre: Rock
- Label: Motown
- Songwriter: Holland–Dozier–Holland
- Producers: Lamont Dozier, Brian Holland

Mary Wells singles chronology
"What's So Easy for Two Is So Hard for One" (1963)	"You Lost the Sweetest Boy" (1963)	"My Guy" (1964)

"You Lost the Sweetest Boy" is a song written by Holland–Dozier–Holland and released as a single by Motown star Mary Wells. The song is most noted for the background vocals by The Supremes and The Temptations.

== Song information ==
In this song, the narrator of the song gets back at a girl who she says always chased after other boys while supposedly with a boyfriend. The narrator ends up winning the girl's boyfriend's affections and before she knew it, the boyfriend had left her for the narrator causing her to chant, "you lost the sweetest boy that you had that time".

Cash Box described it as "an exciting gospel-like thumper...that has a happy romantic ending."

== Release and chart status ==
Released in late 1963, the single reached number 22 on the Billboard Hot 100 and number 10 on the R&B chart.

== Personnel ==
- Lead vocal by Mary Wells
- Background vocals by The Supremes (Florence Ballard, Diana Ross, and Mary Wilson) and The Temptations (Paul Williams, Eddie Kendricks, Melvin Franklin, Elbridge Bryant, and Otis Williams)
- Instrumentation by The Funk Brothers
  - Andrew "Mike" Terry: baritone saxophone solo
