= Where Did Our Love Go =

1964 single by the Supremes

- US picture sleeve

Single by the Supremes

from the album Where Did Our Love Go
- B-side: "He Means the World to Me"
- Released: June 17, 1964
- Studio: Hitsville U.S.A., Detroit
- Genre: Pop-soul; pop; R&B
- Length: 2:33
- Label: Motown
- Songwriter: Holland–Dozier–Holland
- Producers: Brian Holland; Lamont Dozier

The Supremes singles chronology
"Run Run Run" (1964)	"Where Did Our Love Go" (1964)	"Baby Love" (1964)

Where Did Our Love Go track listing
- 12 tracks Side one: 1. "Where Did Our Love Go"; 2. "Run, Run, Run"; 3. "Baby Love"; 4. "When the Lovelight Starts Shining Through His Eyes"; 5. "Come See About Me"; 6. "Long Gone Lover"; Side two: 7. "I'm Giving You Your Freedom"; 8. "A Breathtaking Guy"; 9. "He Means The World to Me"; 10. "Standing at the Crossroads of Love"; 11. "Your Kiss of Fire"; 12. "Ask Any Girl"

Alternative release
- Side A of the Australian single

"Where Did Our Love Go" is a 1964 song recorded by the American music group the Supremes for the Motown label.

Written and produced by Motown's main production team Holland–Dozier–Holland, "Where Did Our Love Go" was the first single by the Supremes to go to the number one position on the Billboard Hot 100 pop singles chart in the United States, a spot it held for two weeks, from August 16 to August 29, 1964. It was also the first of five Supremes songs in a row to reach number one (the others being "Baby Love", "Come See About Me", "Stop! In the Name of Love", and "Back in My Arms Again"). It also reached No. 1 on the Cash Box R&B singles chart.

The Supremes' version is ranked number 472 on Rolling Stone's 500 Greatest Songs of All Time in 2004 and number 475 in 2010 and was selected for preservation in the National Recording Registry in 2016 due to its "cultural, historic, or artistic significance." Billboard named the song number 4 on its list of 100 Greatest Girl Group Songs of All Time. The BBC ranked "Where Did Our Love Go" at number 59 on The Top 100 Digital Motown Chart, which ranks Motown releases by their all time UK downloads and streams.

== History ==
=== Overview ===
According to Brian Holland, "Where Did Our Love Go" was written with the Supremes in mind. Though Supremes member Mary Wilson later wrote that the song had been originally given to the Marvelettes, Holland denied that claim, as did the Marvelettes themselves. Marvelettes member Katherine Anderson-Schnaffer later said that the song did not fit her group's repertoire because it was produced with a slower beat, whereas their music was more uptempo. However, both Eddie Holland and Lamont Dozier were both adamant that the song was indeed presented first to the Marvelettes. Being that they were established hitmakers at Motown, they vetoed the song. When the Supremes were eventually given the song, the group members were not pleased with it. Supremes member Florence Ballard later stated that they had wanted a stronger single, similar to the Marvelettes' "Please Mr. Postman". Another objection from the group was that it sounded too "kiddie-ish." Although the group felt the song did not have the hook needed to make it successful, they decided that they had no choice and prepared to record it.

Initially, the producers argued over who should sing the song, because it had been cut in the same key as Mary Wilson's voice. The lead vocal was ultimately assigned to Diana Ross because, according to Allmusic's Ed Hogan, "she had a unique, sensuous sound." She sang it in her usual high register in the recording studio on April 8. As a result, Ross was told to sing the song in a lower register and begrudgingly complied with Holland/Dozier/Holland's "to the letter" formula. Mary Wilson and Florence Ballard's vocal contribution was significant in bringing a fresh yet smooth tone to the overall sound of the song, while remaining true to the backup arrangements that Lamont Dozier had set down.

After hearing the song's playback, an excited Ross rushed to Gordy's office and told him to come to the studio to listen. At the end of the playback, a satisfied Gordy nodded, telling the producers and the group that the song had the potential to be a top ten hit.

=== Release and reaction ===
"Where Did Our Love Go" was released as a single on June 17, 1964, entering the Hot 100 at number 77. Six weeks later, while the Supremes were on tour as part of Dick Clark's "American Bandstand Caravan of Stars", the song made it to number one for two weeks, spending a total of nine weeks in the Billboard Top Ten. The girls began the tour at the bottom of the bill; by the conclusion of the tour, they were at the top. They performed the song on the NBC variety program Hullabaloo! on Tuesday, January 26, 1965.

The song became the focal point and title track of the group's second album, Where Did Our Love Go, released later that year. A German-language version titled "Baby, Baby, wo ist unsere Liebe" was recorded by the Supremes for German-speaking markets in Europe and released as the B-side to their German recording of "Moonlight and Kisses" in April 1965.

The song struck a chord in the United States, and the Supremes quickly became the most successful chart-topping American popular music group of the 1960s. Billboard described the song as having an "unbeatable beat" and a "true rockin'-blues groove." Cash Box described it as "an infectious handclapping stomp'er...that the femmes and their instrumental support put over with telling teen effect."

The first of their American chart toppers, the song peaked just weeks after the passage of the Civil Rights Act of 1964, critically remarked as capturing the spirit of an America reeling from the assassination of John F. Kennedy, racial tension, and a harbinger of the end of the early optimism of the 1960s.

The song was transmitted to astronauts orbiting Earth in August 1965 during the Gemini 5 mission.

== Personnel ==
- Lead vocals by Diana Ross
- Background vocals by Florence Ballard and Mary Wilson
- All instruments by the Funk Brothers
  - Bass by James Jamerson
  - Drums by Richard "Pistol" Allen
  - Guitar by Eddie Willis, Robert White
  - Piano by Earl Van Dyke
  - Baritone saxophone solo by Andrew "Mike" Terry
  - Vibraphone by Jack Ashford
  - Percussion (foot stomping) by Mike Valvano

== Charts ==
=== Weekly charts ===
Chart (1964)	Peak position
Australia (Kent Music Report)	14
Belgium (Ultratop 50 Flanders)	7
Belgium (Ultratop 50 Wallonia)	21
Canada Top Singles (RPM)	1
Germany (GfK)	16
Netherlands (Billboard)	6
Ireland (IRMA)	3
Netherlands (Dutch Top 40)	16
Netherlands (Single Top 100)	4
New Zealand (Lever Hit Parade)	1
Norway (VG-lista)	6
Singapore (Billboard)	4
Sweden (Kvällstoppen)	6
UK Singles (Official Charts)	3
US Billboard Hot 100	1
US Hot R&B/Hip-Hop Songs (Billboard)	1
US Cashbox Top 100	1
US Cashbox R&B	1
US Record World 100 Top Pops	1
US Record World Top 40 R&B	1
Chart (2021)	Peak position
US R&B Digital Song Sales (Billboard)	15
US R&B/Hip-Hop Digital Song Sales (Billboard)	23

=== Year-end charts ===
Chart (1964)	Rank
Belgium (Ultratop 50 Flanders)	47
Japan Foreign Hits (Billboard)	15
UK Singles (OCC)	30
US Billboard Hot 100	10
US Cashbox Top 100	15
US Cashbox R&B	29

=== All-time charts ===
Chart (1958-2018)	Position
US Billboard Hot 100	586

== Certifications and sales ==
Region	Certification	Certified units/sales
New Zealand (RMNZ)	Gold	15,000^{‡}
United Kingdom (BPI) Sales since 2004	Gold	400,000^{‡}
United States	—	2,000,000
^{‡} Sales+streaming figures based on certification alone.

== Cover versions ==
- In August 1964, British group Peter Jay and the Jaywalkers released their version (Piccadilly single A-side)
- In 1971, this song was covered by Donnie Elbert on his album Where Did Our Love Go, and charted at number 15 with it. On the R&B chart, it peaked at number 6. In Canada, it reached number 55.
- In 1976, the J. Geils Band covered the song on their live 1976 album Blow Your Face Out, and also charted with a studio version as a standalone single at number 68.
- In 1978, it was included as the 11th track on the album Pastiche by the Manhattan Transfer, which reached number 10 in the UK Album charts and no 40 in the Singles chart.
- In 1981, Soft Cell covered the song in a medley with "Tainted Love" on the 12 inch single, and as the AA side to the Tainted Love 7 inch single. It charted at number one in the UK Singles Chart.
- In 1993, Sinitta released The Supreme EP which featured the song along with two other Supremes hits and the 1970 Diana Ross single "Remember Me". It charted at number 49 in the UK.

== See also ==
- List of Billboard Hot 100 number ones of 1964

== Bibliography ==
- Benjaminson, Peter (2008). "The Lost Supreme: The Life of Dreamgirl Florence Ballard". Chicago: Lawrence Hill Books. ISBN 1556527055.
- Chin, Brian and Nathan, David (2000). Reflections Of...The Supremes [CD box set]. New York: Motown Record Co./Universal Music.
- Posner, Gerald (2002). "Motown : Music, Money, Sex, and Power". New York: Random House. ISBN 0-375-50062-6.
- Wilson, Mary and Romanowski, Patricia (1986, 1990, 2000). "Dreamgirl: My Life As a Supreme". New York: Cooper Square Publishers. ISBN 0-8154-1000-X.
