= James Jamerson =

American bassist (1936–1983)

- Jamerson in 1964

Background information
- Born: James Lee Jamerson; January 29, 1936; Edisto Island, South Carolina, U.S.
- Died: August 2, 1983 (aged 47) Los Angeles, California, U.S.
- Genres: R&B; soul; pop; funk; jazz
- Occupation: Musician
- Instruments: Bass guitar; double bass
- Years active: 1956–1983
- Formerly of: The Funk Brothers

James Lee Jamerson (January 29, 1936 – August 2, 1983) (Note: Through most of his life, his birth year was mistakenly believed to be 1938. Jamerson found his birth certificate late in life, and it showed 1936 to be the birth year. (Slutsky 1989, p. 3) This explains discrepancies in some sources relating his age, school grades, graduation year and such.) was an American bassist. He was the bassist on most of the Motown Records hits in the 1960s and early 1970s, though Motown did not credit session musicians on their releases until 1971, and is now regarded as one of the greatest and most influential bass players in modern music history. He was inducted into the Rock and Roll Hall of Fame in 2000. As a session musician he played on twenty-three Billboard Hot 100 number-one hits, as well as fifty-six R&B number-one hits.

In its special issue "The 100 Greatest Bass Players" in 2017, Bass Player magazine ranked Jamerson number one and called him the most important and influential bass guitarist. In 2020, Rolling Stone magazine ranked Jamerson number one in its list of the 50 greatest bassists of all time.

== Early life ==
James Lee Jamerson was born on January 29, 1936, in Edisto Island, South Carolina, to James Jamerson Sr. and Elizabeth Bacon. He was raised in part by his grandmother, who played piano, and his aunt, who sang in a church choir. As a child he was a competent piano player and performed in public, and he briefly played the trombone. As a teenager he was a reserved person, and passionate about music. He listened to gospel, blues, and jazz music on the radio.

== Motown ==
Jamerson moved with his mother to Detroit in 1954. He attended Northwestern High School, where he started playing double bass (also known as upright bass). He began playing in Detroit area blues and jazz clubs and was influenced by jazz bassists Ray Brown, Paul Chambers, and Percy Heath. He was offered a scholarship to study music at Wayne State University, but declined. After graduating from high school, he continued performing in Detroit clubs. He joined blues singer Washboard Willie's band and later toured with Jackie Wilson. His growing reputation started providing him opportunities for session work at various local recording studios. Starting in 1959, he found steady work at Berry Gordy's Hitsville U.S.A. studio in Detroit, home of Gordy's Motown record label. He played bass on the Smokey Robinson single "Way Over There" (1959), John Lee Hooker's album Burnin' (1962), and the Reflections' "(Just Like) Romeo and Juliet" (1964). He became a member of a core of Motown studio musicians who informally called themselves the Funk Brothers. This close-knit group performed on the vast majority of Motown recordings in the 1960s. Jamerson's earliest sessions were performed on double bass, but in the early 1960s he switched to playing primarily an electric Fender Precision Bass.

Like Jamerson, most of the Funk Brothers were jazz musicians who had been recruited by Gordy. For many years, they maintained a schedule of recording during the day at Motown's small basement "Studio A" (which they nicknamed "the Snakepit") and playing in jazz clubs at night. They also occasionally toured the U.S. with Motown artists, though Jamerson stopped touring in 1964 and began to do studio work on a full-time basis. For most of their career, however, the Funk Brothers went uncredited on Motown singles and albums, and their pay was considerably less than that received by the main artists or the label, hence their occasional freelance work elsewhere. In 1968, Jamerson was put on retainer for $1,000 a week (equivalent to $9,258 in 2025), which afforded him and his expanding family a comfortable lifestyle.

Jamerson's session works at Motown include most of the label's hit songs of the 1960s and early 1970s. His works include hits such as "You Can't Hurry Love" by the Supremes, "My Girl" by the Temptations, "Shotgun" by Jr. Walker & the All Stars, "For Once in My Life" and "I Was Made to Love Her" by Stevie Wonder, "Going to a Go-Go" by the Miracles, "Dancing in the Street" by Martha and the Vandellas, "I Heard It Through the Grapevine" by Gladys Knight & the Pips and later Marvin Gaye, "Reach Out I'll Be There" and "Bernadette" by the Four Tops, and most of Gaye's 1971 album What's Going On. (Note: Per Drabløs 2016: "There is no definitive discography of Jamerson's work available in existence, mainly due to the poor crediting of musicians". (p. 146) Drabløs notes four discographies, at bassland.net, philbrodieband.com, allmusic.com, and ricksuchow.com. (p. 186) This article primarily cites the compilation at ricksuchow.com by Rick Suchow, a New York bassist who has written for Bass Guitar, Bass Player, and Bass Musician magazines.) He occasionally recorded for other labels, such as on "Boom Boom" by John Lee Hooker in 1962 and "Higher and Higher" by Jackie Wilson in 1967. Motown released 537 singles and over 200 albums in the 1960s. (Note: At the time a vinyl single typically consisted of two songs.) According to fellow Funk Brothers in the 2002 documentary Standing in the Shadows of Motown, Gaye was desperate to have Jamerson play on his song "What's Going On", and went to several bars to find him. When he found Jamerson and brought him to the studio, the bassist was too intoxicated to stand upright, so he played while lying flat on his back.

Jamerson is reported to have played on nearly every Motown recording between 1963 and 1968, which includes over 60 top-fifteen pop singles. (Note: Motown charted 60 top-fifteen pop singles and 95 top-fifteen R&B singles from 1964 to 1967. (George 2007) The company charted 79 top-ten pop singles in 1960s. (Rock Hall 2000, p. 6)) He performed on 23 number-one hits on the pop charts, (Note: Some sources attribute two additional number-one hits to Jamerson: "Love Is Here and Now You're Gone" and "Someday We'll Be Together". However, a 2019 study by Brian F. Wright attributes these to bassist Carol Kaye.) a record surpassed only by Paul McCartney of the Beatles, who has cited Jamerson as his biggest influence. Jamerson also performed on 56 number-one hits on the R&B charts. (Note: The R&B number, 56, may or may not include the following 4 hits. Billboard did not publish R&B charts between November 30, 1963, and January 23, 1965 – an active period in Motown's history. For this period, Billboard has since adapted the Cash Box charts and as of 2019 lists four R&B number-one hits by Motown: "The Way You Do the Things You Do", "My Guy", "Where Did Our Love Go", "Baby Love".)

== Style and influence ==
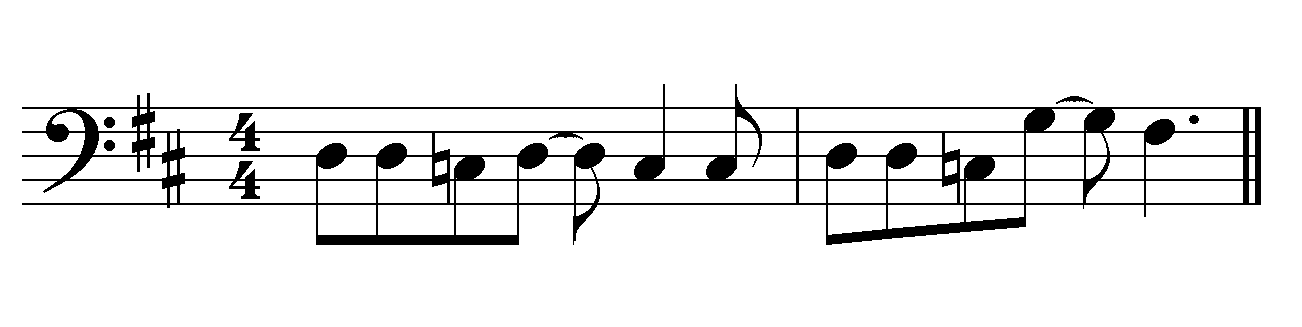
Bass line of the 1966 Temptations song "Get Ready" as played by Jamerson

External videos
- Bass line of "Ain't No Mountain High Enough"

Jamerson is noted for expanding the musical style and role of bass playing in popular music of the time, which had previously (in 1950s and '60s R&B, rock and roll, and country) largely consisted of root notes, fifths, and simple, repetitive patterns. By contrast, many of Jamerson's bass lines relied heavily on chromatic runs, syncopation, ghost notes, inversions, and frequent use of open strings. His nimble bass playing was considered an integral part of the "Motown sound". He created melodic lines that were nonetheless locked to the drum groove.

Jamerson's transition from double bass to electric bass guitar came at a time when the electric bass was a relatively new instrument, and its use and style of play was not well-established. Jamerson's background as a jazz musician and upright bassist informed his playing style, and over time his technique and improvisational approach became more nuanced. By mid-1960s, his style had become an indispensable part of the Motown sound, and in turn impacted popular music. Early examples of Jamerson's impact are "Rescue Me" by Fontella Bass and "You Won't See Me" and "Nowhere Man" by the Beatles.

In a 1983 interview with Musician magazine, Jamerson said that Motown's songwriting-production team "would give me the chord sheet, but they couldn't write for me. When they did, it didn't sound right... When they gave me that chord sheet, I'd look at it, but then start doing what I felt and what I thought would fit... I'd hear the melody line from the lyrics and I'd build the bass line around that." (Note: The (October) 1983 Musician magazine article, the original source of this quote, was authored by Nelson George.) (Note: Gordy made similar statements in his memoir in 1994. However, there are likely exceptions to the quoted claim.)

Bassists who have noted Jamerson's contribution or been influenced by him include Rocco Prestia, Anthony Jackson, Pino Palladino, Paul McCartney, Bob Babbitt, Nathan Watts, Will Lee, Geddy Lee, Chuck Rainey, Marcus Miller, Phil Chen, John Entwistle, Michael League, Mike Watt, Sting, John Paul Jones, Bernard Odum, Victor Wooten, Mike Mills, Robert DeLeo, Glenn Hughes, Tommy Shannon, Suzi Quatro, Ron Asheton, Tony Sales, Peter Cetera, Robert Kool Bell, Bootsy Collins, Flea, Jaco Pastorius, Stanley Clarke, Michael Henderson, Jack Bruce, John Patitucci, Jason Newsted, Rick Danko, Garry Tallent, Alan Gorrie, Jerry Jemmott, Andy Fraser, Brian Wilson and others.

== Post-Motown career ==
Shortly after Motown Records moved to Los Angeles in 1972, Jamerson moved there himself and found occasional studio work, but his relationship with the label officially ended in 1973. In Los Angeles, he performed on hits such as "Neither One of Us" (Gladys Knight & The Pips, 1973), "Boogie Down" (Eddie Kendricks, 1974), "Boogie Fever" (The Sylvers, 1976), "You Don't Have to Be a Star" (Marilyn McCoo and Billy Davis Jr., 1976), and "Heaven Must Have Sent You" (Bonnie Pointer, 1979). He also played on recordings by Robert Palmer (Pressure Drop, 1975), Dennis Coffey (Instant Coffey, 1974), Wah Wah Watson (Elementary, 1976), Boz Scaggs (Slow Dancer, 1974), Dennis Wilson (Pacific Ocean Blue, 1977), Eloise Laws (1977), Smokey Robinson (1978), Ben E. King (1978), Hubert Laws (1979), Aretha Franklin (Aretha, 1980), Tavares (1980), Joe Sample/David T. Walker (Swing Street Cafe, 1981), and Bloodstone (1982). However, Jamerson was not working with a steady group of musicians in Los Angeles as he had in Detroit, and he was not as free to improvise. He felt out of place, and over time his increased dependence on alcohol affected his work. As other bassists went on to use high-tech amplifiers, roundwound strings, and simpler, more repetitive lines incorporating new techniques such as slapping, Jamerson's style fell out of favor with local producers as he was reluctant to change. By the 1980s, he was unable to get any serious session work.

== Personal life and death ==
Jamerson married Annie Wells shortly before graduating from high school. They had four children. His son James Jamerson Jr. (1957–2016) was a session bassist and a member of the disco band Chanson. He had two other sons, Joey and Derek, and a daughter, Dorene (Penny).

Long troubled by alcoholism, Jamerson died of complications from cirrhosis, heart failure, and pneumonia on August 2, 1983, in Los Angeles. He is interred at Detroit's Woodlawn Cemetery.

== Recognition ==
Motown's founder Berry Gordy called Jamerson an "incredible improviser" and said that he "would not do a session unless at least two of the Funk Brothers were present – namely, [drummer] Benny Benjamin and James Jamerson." However, Jamerson, along with the other Funk Brothers, received little formal recognition for his contributions in his lifetime. His work was uncredited until later in his career, and he remained largely anonymous, even to bassists who emulated his style. The first time he was credited on a major Motown release was in 1971 for his performance on Marvin Gaye's What's Going On, where he was credited as "the incomparable James Jamerson". (Note: Though not a major release, Jamerson was credited in 1970 on the album sleeve of the Four Tops' Still Waters Run Deep. (Jisi 2009))

Jamerson was the subject of Allan Slutsky's 1989 book Standing in the Shadows of Motown. The book includes a biography of Jamerson, transcriptions of his bass lines, two CDs in which 25 bassists such as Pino Palladino, John Entwistle, Chuck Rainey, and Geddy Lee speak about Jamerson and play the transcriptions. His story was featured in the subsequent 2002 documentary film of the same title. Jamerson's work has continued to be the subject of various publications. (Note: Examples are, the analysis in Drabløs 2016 book, identifying the features of his style (p. 151) and the difficulty of reproducing it (p. 147); the study in Zarbo 2014 thesis on the connection of his style to his jazz background; the recognition in Bass Player 2017 magazine of his influence on the bass guitar style and role.)

Jamerson was posthumously inducted into the Rock and Roll Hall of Fame in 2000, among the first-ever group of "sidemen" to be inducted. He received a Grammy Lifetime Achievement Award in 2004, and he was inducted into the Musicians Hall of Fame in 2007, both as a member of the Funk Brothers. In 2009, he was inducted into the Fender Hall of Fame by fellow Motown bassist Bob Babbitt. He received the Bass Player magazine Lifetime Achievement Award in 2011. He received the Samson, Hartke and Zoom International Bassist Award in 2012. He was awarded a bust at the Hollywood Guitar Center's Rock Walk, and in 2013 the Funk Brothers received a star on the Hollywood Walk of Fame. In 2015, Brian Wilson of the Beach Boys named Jamerson as his favorite bassist.

Jamerson has received several accolades in his home state of South Carolina. These include a two-day tribute hosted by the Charleston Jazz Initiative and the College of Charleston's Avery Research Center (2003), the Gullah/GeeChee Anointed Spirit Award (2008), the Independent Tone Award for lifetime achievement (2016), the Dr. Martin Luther King Dream Keeper Award (2018), induction to the Lowcountry Music Hall of Fame (2018), induction to the Carolina Beach Music Hall of Fame (2018). The South Carolina General Assembly and his hometown of Edisto Island have passed resolutions in recognition of his contributions.

== Jamerson's equipment ==
Jamerson started on a school-owned upright bass. After graduating from high school, he bought a German upright bass which he used on early Motown hits including "My Guy" by Mary Wells and "Heat Wave" by Martha and the Vandellas. This instrument is in the Rock and Roll Hall of Fame.

In 1960 to 1961, he transitioned to electric bass. Jamerson played mainly the Fender Precision Bass, but is known to have briefly used a five-string Fender Bass V and an eight-string Hagström bass later in his career. He continued to use the upright occasionally, as on "My Guy".

His first electric bass was a refinished 1957 Precision Bass, nicknamed "Black Beauty". The bass was previously owned by his fellow bass player Horace "Chili" Ruth. The instrument was soon stolen, leading him to replace it with an early sixties sunburst Precision, although this was stolen, too.

He then acquired (Note: According to Forte 1979, Jamerson acquired this instrument, nicknamed "The Funk Machine", in 1963. According to Jisi 2009, Jamerson acquired this instrument in 1966.) a stock 1962 Precision, which would become his primary instrument for most of his career. (Note: There is speculation that in mid to late-1960s Jamerson's then-primary instrument was parted with, and that he acquired and replaced it with a 1966 model.) It was nicknamed "The Funk Machine" by his fellow musicians. It had a three-tone sunburst finish, a tortoiseshell pickguard, rosewood fretboard and chrome pickup and bridge covers (the latter containing a piece of foam used to dampen sustain and some overtones). On the heel of the instrument, he carved the word "FUNK" in blue ink. He typically set its volume and tone knobs at their maximum positions. This instrument was stolen just days before Jamerson's death in 1983 and has not been recovered.

Jamerson used La Bella heavy-gauge (.052–.110) flatwound strings which were never replaced unless a string broke. He did not particularly take care of the instrument, saying that "The dirt keeps the funk". The instrument's neck may have eventually warped, as many claimed it was impossible to play. While this made it more difficult to fret, Jamerson believed it improved the instrument's sound. In the mid-1970s, a producer attempted to modernize Jamerson's sound by asking him to switch to brighter-sounding roundwound strings, but he politely declined.

One aspect of Jamerson's upright playing that carried over to the electric bass was the fact that he generally used only his right index finger to pluck the strings, while resting his third and fourth fingers on the instrument's chrome pickup cover. Jamerson's index finger even earned its own nickname: "The Hook". Another aspect of Jamerson's jazz upright playing that carried over was his use of open strings to pivot around the fretboard, which served to give his lines a fluid feeling. He played with a relaxed and light touch.

Jamerson's amplifier of choice at club performances was an Ampeg B-15; in larger venues, he used a blue Kustom with twin 15-inch speakers. On both, the bass knob was typically turned up full and the treble turned halfway up. On most of his studio recordings, his bass was directly injected into the studio's custom-made mixing console, together with the guitars of Eddie Willis, Robert White, and Joe Messina. He adjusted the mixing console so that his sound was slightly overdriven and compressed.

In 2017, it was reported that Jamerson had given a 1961 Precision Bass to bassist Billy Hayes in 1967 or 1968. This instrument is in the Musicians Hall of Fame museum. (Note: This instrument was auctioned in 2017 and subsequently has been in the Musicians Hall of Fame.) In 1977, Jamerson was photographed with a 1965–1968 Precision bass (a line of instruments which had a transition logo). There is speculation that in the mid to late-1960s Jamerson's then-primary instrument was parted with, and that he acquired and replaced it with a 1966 model.
