= Baby Love =

1964 single by the Supremes

- Side A of the Australian single

Single by the Supremes

from the album Where Did Our Love Go
- B-side: "Ask Any Girl"
- Released: September 17, 1964
- Studio: Hitsville U.S.A. (Studio A)
- Genre: Pop; rhythm and blues
- Length: 2:34
- Label: Motown
- Songwriter: Holland–Dozier–Holland
- Producers: Brian Holland; Lamont Dozier

The Supremes singles chronology
"Where Did Our Love Go" (1964)	"Baby Love" (1964)	"Come See About Me" (1964)

Audio sample
- file; help

"Baby Love" is a song by the American music group the Supremes from their second studio album, Where Did Our Love Go. It was written and produced by Motown's main production team Holland–Dozier–Holland and was released on September 17, 1964.

"Baby Love" topped the Billboard pop singles chart in the United States from October 25, 1964, through November 21, 1964, and in the United Kingdom pop singles chart concurrently. Beginning with "Baby Love", the Supremes became the first Motown act to have more than one American number-one single, and by the end of the decade, would have more singles hitting the top slot than any other Motown act (or American pop music group) with 12, a record they continue to hold.

It was nominated for the 1965 Grammy Award for Best Rhythm & Blues Recording, losing to Nancy Wilson's "How Glad I Am". It is considered one of the most popular songs of the late 20th century; "Baby Love" was ranked number 324 on the Rolling Stone list of The 500 Greatest Songs of All Time. It dropped to number 499 on the 2021 update of the list. The BBC ranked "Baby Love" at number 23 on The Top 100 Digital Motown Chart, which ranks Motown releases by their all time UK downloads and streams.

== History ==
At the insistence of Berry Gordy hoping for a follow-up chart-topper, Holland–Dozier–Holland produced "Baby Love" to sound like "Where Did Our Love Go". Elements were reincorporated into the single such as Diana Ross's cooing lead vocal and oohing, Florence Ballard and Mary Wilson's "baby-baby" backup, the Funk Brothers' instrumental track, and teenager Mike Valvano's footstomping. Further, both Ballard and Wilson had brief solo ad-libs towards the end of the song on the released version (after this release Ross would be the only member to have any solos on the 1960s singles).

It was the second of five consecutive Supremes songs to go to number one in the United States, reaching the top spot of the U.S. Billboard Hot 100 pop singles chart on October 31, 1964, and staying there for four weeks. The song also reached number one on the UK Singles Chart for two weeks before being dislodged by The Rolling Stones' "Little Red Rooster", and topped the Cash Box magazine's R&B chart. "Baby Love" and Roy Orbison's "It's Over and "Oh, Pretty Woman" are the only American singles that topped the UK charts between 1963 and 1965.

Billboard stated that "the swinging harmony style keeps [the song] rolling all the way through." Cash Box described it as "a heartfelt, steady beat thumper...that the femmes deliver in ultra-commercial fashion."

"Baby Love" was later included on the soundtrack to the 1975 feature film Cooley High.

== Personnel ==
- Lead vocals by Diana Ross
- Backing and ad-lib vocals by Florence Ballard and Mary Wilson
- All instruments by the Funk Brothers
  - Earl Van Dyke – piano
  - Eddie Willis – guitar
  - James Jamerson – bass
  - Richard "Pistol" Allen – drums
  - Jack Ashford – vibraphone
  - Henry Cosby – tenor saxophone
  - Mike Terry – baritone saxophone solo
- Footstomps by Mike Valvano

== Charts ==
=== Weekly charts ===
Chart (1964–1965)	Peak position
Australia (Kent Music Report)	26
Belgium (Ultratop 50 Flanders)	13
Belgium (Ultratop 50 Wallonia)	18
Canada (RPM)	2
Germany (GfK)	15
Ireland (IRMA)	2
Netherlands (Dutch Top 40)	8
Netherlands (Single Top 100)	7
New Zealand (Lever Hit Parade)	1
Norway (VG-lista)	5
Singapore (Billboard)	1
South Africa (Billboard)	3
Sweden (Kvällstoppen)	7
UK Singles (Official Charts)	1
Cash Box Top 100	1
US Cash Box R&B	1
US Billboard Hot 100	1
US Hot R&B/Hip-Hop Songs (Billboard)	1
US Record World 100 Top Pops	1
US Record World Top 40 R&B	1
Chart (1974)	Peak position
Ireland (IRMA)	16
UK Singles (Official Charts)	12
Chart (2012)	Peak position
UK Physical Singles (OCC)	6

=== Year-end charts ===
Chart (1964)	Rank
Belgium (Ultratop 50 Flanders)	77
UK Singles (OCC)	28
US Billboard Hot 100	33
Chart (1965)	Rank
Belgium (Ultratop 50 Flanders)	79
Netherlands (Dutch Top 40)	71
US Cash Box Top 100	100
US Cashbox R&B	45

== Certifications ==
Region	Certification	Certified units/sales
New Zealand (RMNZ)	Gold	15,000^{‡}
United Kingdom (BPI) Sales since 2004	Platinum	600,000^{‡}
United States (RIAA)	Gold	1,000,000
^{‡} Sales+streaming figures based on certification alone.

== Cover versions ==
- In 1981, British singer and actress Honey Bane covered the song with record label Zonophone (EMI). The single peaked at #58 on the UK music charts.
- In 1986, Serbian and Yugoslav singer Bebi Dol released a cover of the song on the 12-inch single "Rudi".

== See also ==
- List of Billboard Hot 100 number-one singles of 1964
