= Uriel Jones =

American drummer (1934–2009)

- Born: June 13, 1934; Detroit, Michigan, U.S.
- Died: March 24, 2009 (aged 74); Dearborn, Michigan, U.S.
- Genres: R&B; soul
- Occupation: Musician
- Instrument: Drums
- Years active: 1959–2009
- Formerly of: The Funk Brothers

Uriel Jones (June 13, 1934 – March 24, 2009) was an American musician. Jones was a recording session drummer for Motown's in-house studio band, the Funk Brothers, during the 1960s and early 1970s.

== Biography ==
Jones was first hired by Motown as a fill-in for principal drummer Benny Benjamin; along with Richard "Pistol" Allen, he moved up the line as recordings increased and Benjamin's health deteriorated. Hits that Jones played drums on include "Ain't No Mountain High Enough" - both versions, by Marvin Gaye & Tammi Terrell in 1967 and the 1970 remake by Diana Ross, "I Heard It Through the Grapevine" and "Ain't That Peculiar" by Marvin Gaye, "Cloud Nine" (in which he was augmented by Spider Webb), "I Can't Get Next to You", and "Ain't Too Proud to Beg" by the Temptations, "What Becomes of the Brokenhearted" by Jimmy Ruffin, Jr. Walker's "Home Cookin'," "The Tracks of My Tears" and "I Second That Emotion" by Smokey Robinson & the Miracles, and "For Once in My Life" by Stevie Wonder. His influences included jazz drummer Art Blakey. For his Motown recordings, Jones performed on a studio set composed of Ludwig, Slingerland, Rogers and Gretsch components and possibly Zildjian cymbals. Jones became better known to music fans through his appearance in the feature documentary film, Standing in the Shadows of Motown. Motown arranger Paul Riser said of Jones that "Uriel's drum sound was the most open and laid-back, and he was the funkiest of the three guys we had...He had a mixed feel and did a lot of different things well."

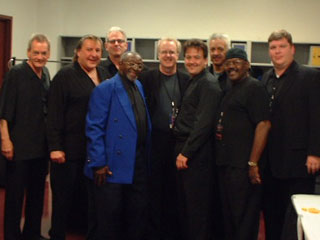
Uriel Jones (8th from left) as part of The Funk Brothers in 2006

In 2008, he performed on the Carl Dixon BandTraxs session at Studio A, Dearborn Heights, Detroit, where he and fellow drummer Spider Webb helped complete Dixon's dreams of paying homage to musicians from the city. In addition to Jones, on the session were others including Dennis Coffey, Bob Babbitt, Ray Monette, Robert Jones, Spider Webb, George Katsakis (The Royaltones), Gil Bridges (Rare Earth), Dennis Sheridan, Larry Fratangelo, John Trudell, David Jennings, Mark Burger, George Benson, Ed Gooch and Rob Pipho. Also ex Motown arranger David Van De Pitte, scored the musical arrangements around the original UK demos he was sent, and led the band in the studio.

Jones died aged 74 at Oakwood Hospital & Medical Center in Dearborn, Michigan, after suffering complications from a heart attack.
