= Joe Messina =

American guitarist (1928–2022)

- Messina in 1960s

Background information
- Birth name: Joseph Lucian Messina
- Born: December 13, 1928; Detroit, Michigan, U.S.
- Died: April 4, 2022 (aged 93); Northville, Michigan, U.S.
- Genres: R&B; soul; jazz
- Occupation: Musician
- Instruments: Guitar
- Formerly of: The Funk Brothers

Joseph Lucian Messina (December 13, 1928 – April 4, 2022) was an American guitarist. Dubbed the "white brother with soul", he was one of the most prolific guitarists in Motown Records' in-house studio band, the Funk Brothers.

== Early life ==
Messina was born in Detroit on December 13, 1928. He started playing the guitar when he was thirteen, after his father purchased one for him. Messina initially attended Central High School in his hometown, before studying music at Cass Technical High School. He eventually dropped out to focus on becoming a professional musician.

== Career ==
Messina first played in jazz clubs in Detroit starting in the late 1940s. By his mid-twenties, he was playing in the ABC Television studio band, accompanying such guests as Sonny Stitt, Charlie Parker, Stan Getz, Jack Teagarden, Lee Konitz, Jimmy Giuffre, Pepper Adams, Donald Byrd, Frank Rosolino, and Dizzy Gillespie. Also while at ABC, Messina played on The Soupy Sales Show, alongside guests such as Miles Davis and Charlie Parker.

In 1958, Motown Records founder Berry Gordy recruited Messina for his Hitsville U.S.A. studio musicians group, known as The Funk Brothers. In the 1960s and early 1970s, they recorded the instrumentals for hundreds of Motown hit records. During this time, Messina worked with performers such as Diana Ross & the Supremes, the Temptations, Marvin Gaye, the Four Tops, Stevie Wonder, and Smokey Robinson & the Miracles. Among the many Motown hits Messina played on are "Dancing in the Street" (Martha & the Vandellas, 1964), "I Can't Help Myself (Sugar Pie Honey Bunch)" (Four Tops, 1965), and "Your Precious Love" (Marvin Gaye & Tammi Terrell, 1967). Messina stopped playing guitar for 30 years after Berry Gordy took his Motown operation to Los Angeles in 1972, explaining how he "just had no interest".

Messina was the creator of an alternative music technique known as the Interval Study Method, which uses the chromatic and diatonic scales to create music. He continued to reside in Detroit until his death, where he performed as a jazz musician for a number of years. On March 21, 2013, The Funk Brothers were awarded a star on the Hollywood Walk Of Fame. The Funk Brothers were also the subject of the 2002 documentary Standing in the Shadows of Motown, in which Messina appeared extensively.

== Personal life ==
Messina was married to wife Josie who died in 2009. The couple had two children: Joel and Janice.

Messina died on April 4, 2022, at age 93 at his son's home in Northville, Michigan. He suffered from kidney disease during the last twelve years of his life.

== Sources ==
- Liner notes of Messina Madness (1993)
- Standing in the shadows of Motown, Artisan Entertainment, 2003, OCLC 970743589
