= Richard Allen (drummer) =

American drummer (1932–2002)

Background information
- Birth name: Howard Richard Allen
- Born: August 13, 1932; Memphis, Tennessee, U.S.
- Died: June 30, 2002 (aged 69); Detroit, Michigan, U.S.
- Genres: R&B; soul
- Occupation: Musician
- Instrument: Drums
- Years active: 1959–2002
- Formerly of: The Funk Brothers

Howard Richard "Pistol" Allen (August 13, 1932 – June 30, 2002) was an American musician, most notable as a Motown session drummer with the Funk Brothers.

== History ==
Allen was the primary recording session drummer for Motown Records' in-house Funk Brothers band on most of Holland-Dozier and Holland's hit productions of the 1960s. Hits for which Allen played the drums include "Heat Wave" by Martha and the Vandellas, "Signed, Sealed, Delivered I'm Yours" by Stevie Wonder, "The Way You Do the Things You Do" by the Temptations, "Where Did Our Love Go" and "Baby Love" by the Supremes, "How Sweet It Is (to Be Loved by You)" and "I Heard It Through the Grapevine" by Marvin Gaye, and "Reach Out I'll Be There" by the Four Tops.

Allen's influences included Max Roach, Buddy Rich, and fellow Funk Brother Benny Benjamin. He played a studio set made up of Ludwig, Slingerland, Rogers and Gretsch components and likely Zildjian cymbals.

Although he appeared in Standing in the Shadows of Motown, the 2002 documentary about the Funk Brothers, Allen died of cancer in June 2002 in Detroit, Michigan at the age of 69, a little over four months before the completed film was released.

Allen was inducted into the Michigan Rock and Roll Legends online Hall of Fame in 2010 as a member of the Funk Brothers.

== Discography ==
With James Carter

- Live at Baker's Keyboard Lounge (Warner Bros., 2001 [2004])
