= The Three Degrees discography =

- Studio albums: 13
- Live albums: 2
- Compilation albums: 21
- Singles: 64

This is the discography of American female vocal group The Three Degrees.

== Albums ==
=== Studio albums ===
Title	Album details	Peak chart positions								Certifications and sales
Title	Album details	US	US R&B	AUS	CAN	GER	JPN	NL	UK	Certifications and sales
Maybe	Released: July 1970; Label: Roulette; Formats: LP	139	16	—	—	—	61 (Note: Charted in 1974)	—	—	JPN: 12,900
The Three Degrees	Released: October 1973; Label: Philadelphia International; Formats: LP, MC, 8-track	28	33	46	55	31	7	—	11	JPN: 166,700; UK: Gold
International	Released: February 7, 1975; Label: Philadelphia International; Formats: LP, MC, 8-track; Released in the UK as Take Good Care of Yourself and in Europe as With Love	99	31	86	—	—	3	—	6	JPN: 189,530; UK: Gold
A Toast of Love	Released: May 21, 1976; Label: CBS/Sony; Formats: LP; Japan-only release	—	—	—	—	—	21	—	—	JPN: 28,590
Standing Up for Love	Released: February 1977; Label: Epic; Formats: LP, MC	—	—	—	—	—	—	—	—	
New Dimensions	Released: October 1978; Label: Ariola; Formats: LP, MC	169	—	97	—	—	—	32	34	UK: Silver
3D	Released: October 12, 1979; Label: Ariola; Formats: LP, MC	—	—	—	—	—	—	—	61	
Album of Love	Released: 1982; Label: Self-released; Formats: LP; UK-only release	—	—	—	—	—	—	—	—	
…And Holding	Released: August 1989; Label: Ichiban; Formats: CD, LP, MC	—	76	—	—	—	—	—	—	
Out of the Past, into the Future	Released: 1993; Label: Ariola/BMG; Formats: CD, MC	—	—	—	—	—	—	—	—	
Christmas with the Three Degrees	Released: 1998; Label: Marathon Media; Formats: CD	—	—	—	—	—	—	—	—	
Undercover 2009	Released: 2009; Label: Reader's Digest; Formats: digital download	—	—	—	—	—	—	—	—	
Strategy – Our Tribute to Philadelphia	Released: March 4, 2016; Label: SoulMusic; Formats: CD	—	—	—	—	—	—	—	—	
"—" denotes releases that did not chart or were not released in that territory.

=== Live albums ===
Title	Album details	Peak chart positions				Certifications and sales
Title	Album details	US	US R&B	JPN	SWE	Certifications and sales
Live in Japan	Released: November 1, 1975; Label: Philadelphia International; Formats: 2xLP, MC; Japan-only release	—	—	28	—	JPN: 30,180
The Three Degrees Live	Released: December 1975; Label: Philadelphia International; Formats: LP, MC, 8-track	199	34	—	45	
"—" denotes releases that did not chart or were not released in that territory.

=== Compilation albums ===
Title	Album details	Peak chart positions				Certifications and sales
Title	Album details	US R&B	JPN	NL	UK	Certifications and sales
The Three Degrees & MFSB Show	Released: March 21, 1974; Label: Philadelphia International; Formats: LP; Japan-only release	—	6	—	—	JPN: 143,230
So Much Love	Released: January 1975; Label: Roulette, Pye International; Formats: LP, MC, 8-track	56	—	—	—	
The Best of the Trammps Featuring: MFSB & The Three Degrees	Released: February 1975; Label: Philadelphia International; Formats: LP; Europe-only release	—	—	14	—	
The Three Degrees & Philadelphia Sounds	Released: June 21, 1975; Label: Philadelphia International; Formats: LP, MC; Japan-only release	—	29	—	—	JPN: 53,030
Grand Prix 20	Released: June 20, 1976; Label: Philadelphia International; Formats: LP; Japan-only release	—	44	—	—	JPN: 13,960
The Three Degrees	Released: April 1978; Label: CBS; Formats: LP, MC	—	—	—	—	
A Collection of Their 20 Greatest Hits	Released: February 1979; Label: Epic; Formats: LP, MC	—	—	—	8	UK: Gold
Gold	Released: September 1980; Label: K-tel/Ariola; Formats: LP, MC	—	—	—	9	UK: Gold
Hits! Hits! Hits!	Released: September 1981; Label: Pickwick; Formats: LP, MC	—	—	—	—	
The Best Of…	Released: April 1990; Label: Connoisseur Collection; Formats: CD, 2xLP, MC	—	—	—	—	
Complete Swan Recordings	Released: 21 December 1992; Label: Sequel; Formats: CD	—	—	—	—	
Let's Get It On	Released: 1993; Label: Tring; Formats: CD	—	—	—	—	
The Very Best of the Three Degrees	Released: 1993; Label: Music Collection International; Formats: CD	—	—	—	—	
The Roulette Years	Released: January 1996; Label: Sequel; Formats: CD	—	—	—	—	
The Best of the Three Degrees: When Will I See You Again	Released: June 4, 1996; Label: Epic Associated; Formats: CD, MC	—	—	—	—	
Turnin' Up the Heat	Released: August 4, 1997; Label: Sony Music; Formats: CD, MC	—	—	—	—	
Super Hits	Released: May 7, 2002; Label: Epic/Legacy; Formats: CD	—	—	—	—	
The Best Of	Released: April 30, 2009; Label: Camden/Sony Music; Formats: CD	—	—	—	—	
The Very Best of the Three Degrees	Released: June 6, 2014; Label: Camden/Sony Music; Formats: CD	—	—	—	—	
When Will I See You Again: The Best of the Three Degrees	Released: June 23, 2017; Label: Music Club Deluxe; Formats: 2xCD, digital download	—	—	—	—	
Gold	Released: November 6, 2020; Label: Crimson/Sony Music; Formats: 3xCD	—	—	—	80	
"—" denotes releases that did not chart or were not released in that territory.

== Singles ==
Title	Year	Peak chart positions											Certifications and sales	Album
Title	Year	US BB	US CB	US Dance	US R&B	AUS	BEL (FL)	CAN	GER	JPN	NL	UK	Certifications and sales	Album
"Gee Baby (I'm Sorry)"	1965	80	69	—	—	—	—	14	—	—	—	—		Non-album singles
"Let's Shindig" (as part of the In Crowd)	1965	—	—	—	—	—	—	—	—	—	—	—		Non-album singles
"I'm Gonna Need You"	1965	—	—	—	—	—	—	—	—	—	—	—		Non-album singles
"Close Your Eyes"	1965	126	105	—	—	—	—	—	—	—	—	—		Non-album singles
"Eve of Tomorrow" (Tony Mammarella with backing vocals by the Three Degrees)	1965	—	—	—	—	—	—	—	—	—	—	—		Non-album singles
"Look in My Eyes"	1965	97	97	—	—	—	—	—	—	—	—	—		Non-album singles
"Maybe"	1966	—	—	—	—	—	—	—	—	—	—	—		Non-album singles
"Tales Are True"	1966	—	—	—	—	—	—	—	—	—	—	—		Non-album singles
"Love of My Life"	1966	—	—	—	—	—	—	—	—	—	—	—		Non-album singles
"Contact"	1968	—	—	—	—	—	—	—	—	—	—	—		Non-album singles
"Down in the Boondocks"	1969	—	—	—	—	—	—	—	—	—	—	—		Non-album singles
"The Feeling of Love"	1969	—	—	—	—	—	—	—	—	—	—	—		Non-album singles
"What I See"	1970	—	—	—	—	—	—	—	—	—	—	—		Non-album singles
"Melting Pot"	1970	—	—	—	—	—	—	—	—	—	—	—		Non-album singles
"Maybe" (re-recorded version)	1970	29	24	—	4	—	—	48	—	—	—	—		Maybe
"I Do Take You"	1970	48	43	—	7	—	—	61	—	—	—	—		Non-album single
"You're the One"	1970	77	57	—	19	—	—	—	—	—	— (Note: "You're the One" didn't enter the Dutch Single Top 30, but did peak at number 6 on the Single Tip chart.)	—		Maybe
"There's So Much Love All Around Me"	1971	98	99	—	33	—	—	—	—	—	—	—		Non-album singles
"Ebb Tide"	1971	—	—	—	—	—	—	—	—	—	—	—		Non-album singles
"Trade Winds"	1972	—	—	—	46	—	—	—	—	—	—	—		Non-album singles
"I Wanna Be Your Baby"	1972	—	96	—	—	—	—	—	—	—	—	—		Non-album singles
"I Won't Let You Go"	1972	—	—	—	—	—	—	—	—	—	—	—		Non-album singles
"Dirty Ol' Man"	1973	—	—	—	58	—	1	—	34	36	1	—	JPN: 144,000	The Three Degrees
"Year of Decision"	1974	—	—	—	74	—	8	—	27	—	8	13		The Three Degrees
"TSOP (The Sound of Philadelphia)" (MFSB featuring the Three Degrees)	1974	1	1	—	1	12	—	1	5	68	18	22	JPN: 63,000; US: Gold	Love Is the Message
"Love Is the Message" (MFSB featuring the Three Degrees)	1974	85	48	—	42	—	—	37	—	63	— (Note: "Love Is the Message" didn't enter the Dutch Single Top 30, but did peak at number 3 on the Single Tip chart.)	—	JPN: 41,000	Love Is the Message
"When Will I See You Again"	1974	2	1	—	4	2	2	5	27	42	3	1	JPN: 113,000; US: Platinum; UK: Silver	The Three Degrees
"When Will I See You Again" (Japanese-language version; Japan-only release)	1974	—	—	—	—	—	—	—	—	96	—	—	JPN: 3,000	Non-album single
"Get Your Love Back" (UK and Continental Europe-only release)	1974	—	—	—	—	—	—	—	26	—	21	34		International
"Midnight Train" (Japan-only release)	1974	—	—	—	—	—	—	—	—	50	—	—	JAP: 73,000	The Three Degrees & MFSB Show
"La chanson populaire" (France, Canada and Japan-only release)	1974	—	—	—	—	—	—	—	—	61	—	—	JPN: 35,000	International (Note: These tracks were only included on the Japanese version of the album.)
"Nigai Namida" (Japan-only release)	1975	—	—	—	—	—	—	—	—	15	—	—	JPN: 143,000	International
"I Didn't Know"	1975	—	—	—	18	—	—	—	—	—	—	—		The Three Degrees
"Take Good Care of Yourself"	1975	—	—	—	64	69	30	—	—	90	20	9	JPN: 9,000; UK: Silver	International
"You're the Fool" (Germany-only release)	1975	—	—	—	—	—	—	—	—	—	—	—		Maybe
"Long Lost Lover" (UK and Continental Europe-only release)	1975	—	—	—	—	—	—	—	—	—	— (Note: "Long Lost Lover" didn't enter the Dutch Single Top 30, but did peak at number 18 on the Single Tip chart.)	40		International
"Free Ride"	1976	—	—	—	—	—	—	—	—	—	—	—		The Three Degrees Live
"Do It (Use Your Mind)" (Japan-only release)	1976	—	—	—	—	—	—	—	—	52	—	—	JPN: 68,000	A Toast of Love
"Toast of Love" (UK, Continental Europe and Japan-only release)	1976	—	—	—	—	—	—	—	—	—	— (Note: "Toast of Love" didn't enter the Dutch Single Top 30, but did peak at number 9 on the Single Tip chart.)	36		A Toast of Love
"What I Did for Love"	1976	—	—	—	—	—	—	—	—	—	—	—		Standing Up for Love
"Standing Up for Love"	1977	—	—	—	—	—	—	—	—	—	—	—		Standing Up for Love
"We're All Alone" (UK-only release)	1977	—	—	—	—	—	—	—	—	—	—	—		Standing Up for Love
"Giving Up, Giving In"	1978	—	—	12	39	—	6	88	—	—	8	12		New Dimensions
"Woman in Love"	1979	—	—	—	27	56	—	—	—	—	—	3	UK: Gold	New Dimensions
"The Runner"	1979	—	—	56	—	—	7	—	—	—	6	10	UK: Silver	New Dimensions
"The Golden Lady" (UK and Continental Europe-only release)	1979	—	—	—	—	—	—	—	—	—	—	56		The Golden Lady (soundtrack)
"Jump the Gun"	1979	—	—	30	—	—	—	—	—	—	—	48		3D
"My Simple Heart"	1979	—	—	—	—	—	26	—	—	—	—	9	UK: Silver	3D
"Without You"	1980	—	—	—	—	—	—	—	—	—	—	—		3D
"Starlight"	1980	—	—	—	—	—	—	—	—	—	—	—		3D
"Set Me Free" (Note: "Set Me Free" was only released as a 12-inch single in Canada and a 7-inch single in Chile. However, it charted on the US Disco Chart as a cut from the album 3D.)	1981	—	—	12	—	—	—	—	—	—	—	—		3D
"Liar (You've Been Cheating on Me)" (UK-only release)	1983	—	—	—	—	—	—	—	—	—	—	97		Non-album singles
"The Heaven I Need"	1985	—	—	—	—	—	—	—	—	—	33	42		Non-album singles
"This Is the House"	1986	—	—	—	—	—	—	—	—	—	—	101		Non-album singles
"Tie U Up"	1989	—	—	—	—	—	—	—	—	—	—	—		...And Holding
"Make It Easy on Yourself"	1989	—	—	—	—	—	—	—	—	—	—	—		...And Holding
"A Tender Lie" (UK-only release)	1989	—	—	—	—	—	—	—	—	—	—	—		...And Holding
"Lock It Up"	1989	—	—	—	—	—	—	—	—	—	—	—		...And Holding
"When Will I See You Again" (Thomas Anders featuring the Three Degrees; Europe-only release)	1993	—	—	—	—	—	—	—	37	—	—	—		When Will I See You Again
"Dirty Ol' Man '93" (Europe-only release)	1993	—	—	—	—	—	—	—	—	—	—	—		Out of the Past, Into the Future
"Hurry, Hurry" (Germany-only release)	1994	—	—	—	—	—	—	—	—	—	—	—		Out of the Past, Into the Future
"Last Christmas" (Alien Voices featuring the Three Degrees; UK-only release)	1998	—	—	—	—	—	—	—	—	—	—	54		Non-album singles
"Holding Back"	2010	—	—	—	—	—	—	—	—	—	—	—		Non-album singles
"Strategy"	2016	—	—	—	—	—	—	—	—	—	—	—		Strategy – Our Tribute to Philadelphia
"—" denotes releases that did not chart or were not released in that territory.
