= Sheila Ferguson =

American singer, songwriter, actress, and author (born 1947)

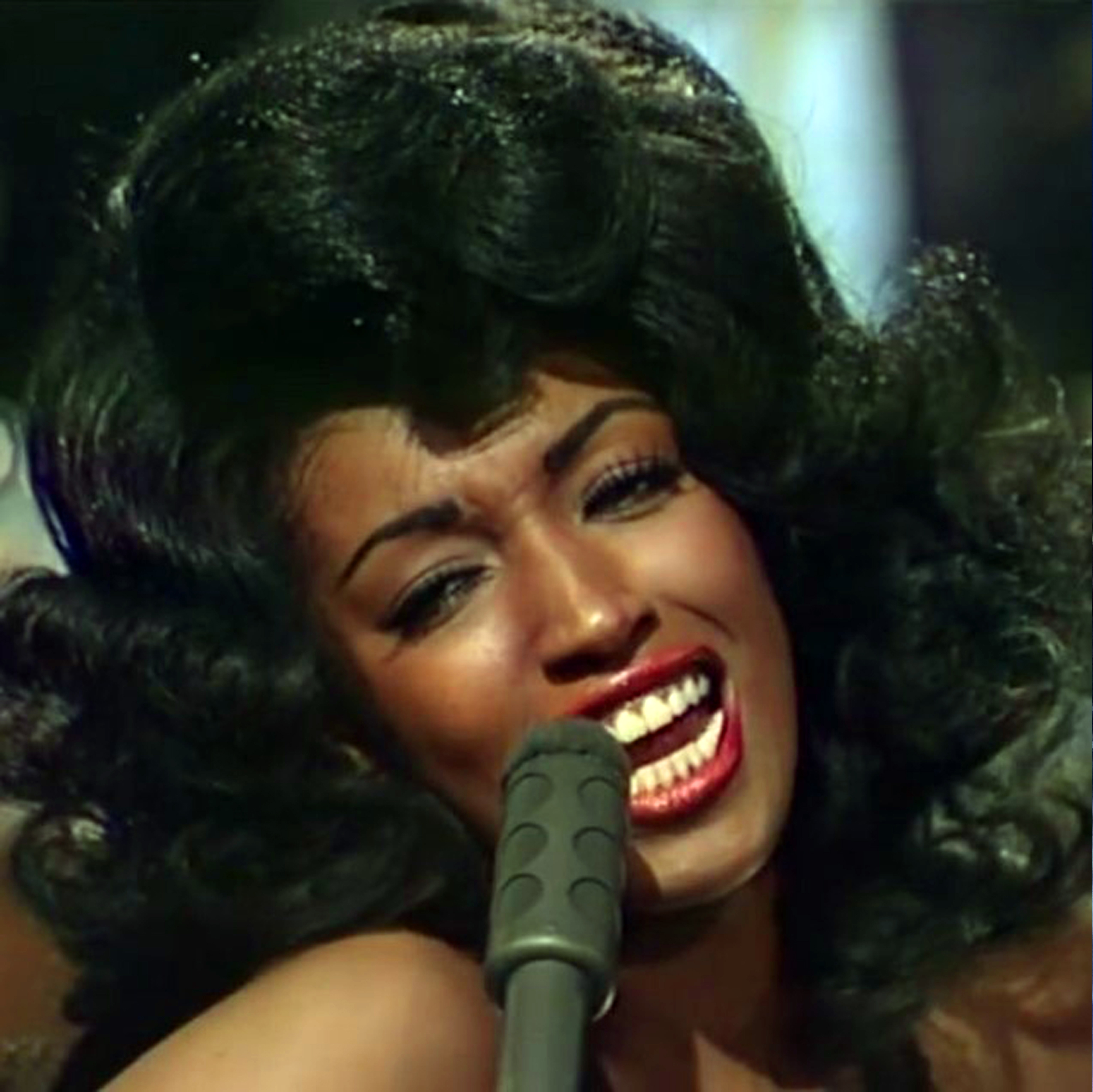
- Born: October 8, 1947 (age 79); Philadelphia, Pennsylvania, U.S.
- Occupations: Singer; songwriter; actress; author
- Spouse: Chris Robinson (m. 1980; div. 2004)
- Children: 2
- Website: sheilaferguson.com

Sheila Diana Ferguson (born October 8, 1947) is an American singer, songwriter, actress, and author, who has worked primarily in the United Kingdom. Between 1966 and 1986, she was a member of the American female soul music group the Three Degrees, singing lead vocals on most of the group's biggest hits, most notably "When Will I See You Again", which had international success, topping the UK Singles Chart and peaking at number 2 in the US.

Following her departure from the Three Degrees in 1986, Ferguson went on to have her own solo singing career, touring internationally, making multiple TV appearances, and releasing a solo album titled A New Kind of Medicine. She has forged a prolific stage and screen career in the UK, starring in numerous musicals, soul legend tours, and her own sitcom Land of Hope and Gloria (1992). She is also the best-selling author of the cook book Soul Food: Classic Cuisine from the Deep South (1989).

== Early life ==
Sheila Diana Ferguson was born in Philadelphia. Despite attending more than 10 schools as a child, she was academically gifted and had originally wanted to become a psychologist. A teenage crush on the singer Marvin Gaye led her to try her hand at singing in the hope that, by doing so, she would be able to meet him. She achieved this dream some time later when, appearing at the Apollo Theater, she talked to Gaye in his dressing room.

While at high school, Ferguson was introduced by her teacher to Richard Barrett, who had previously been a singer with a group called the Valentines, and later had gone on to become a manager. Barrett placed Ferguson's first single, "Little Red Riding Hood"/"How Did That Happen", with Landa Records. Subsequently signed to Swan Records, Ferguson also recorded the first two songs she wrote herself, "I Weep for You" and "Don't Leave Me Lover", out of three solo singles for the label during 1965.

Other solo songs she recorded were "How Did That Happen", written by Ugene Dozier, "And in Return" and "Are You Satisfied", written by General Johnson (later to become known as the lead singer of Chairmen of the Board).

Ferguson recorded two up-tempo numbers written for her by a talented up and coming songwriter by the name of Leon Huff. Huff would later team up with Kenny Gamble to form the Philadelphia International Records. These were "Heartbroken Memories" and "Signs of Love".

== Career ==
=== Soul music ===
==== The Three Degrees ====
Although Barrett signed Ferguson as a solo artist, he was already in the process of creating a group called the Three Degrees with the line up of Fayette Pinkney, Shirley Porter and Linda Turner. By 1966, the line up had changed to be Fayette Pinkney, Helen Scott and Janet Harmon. However, Scott announced she would be leaving the group to get married. Having previously appeared with the group as a cover when one of the girls fell ill, Ferguson was asked by Pinkney and Harmon to become a permanent member. In 1967, Harmon left the group and was replaced by Valerie Holiday. Barrett signed them to several record labels, and by 1970, they were signed to Roulette Records and released their first album, Maybe, the title song of which reached number 4 in the US R&B charts. The singles "I Do Take You" and "You're the Fool" followed, as well as the second album, So Much Love.

In 1971, the group appeared in the Oscar-winning film The French Connection singing "Everybody Gets to Go to the Moon". In 1973, they appeared in the sitcom Sanford and Son.

It was during this year that the Three Degrees enjoyed their greatest success when signed by Philadelphia International Records and working with Gamble and Huff. Their first song under this label was "TSOP (The Sound of Philadelphia)", which was the theme song for Soul Train. Under this label the group began to tour internationally. The self-titled album The Three Degrees was released in 1973 and yielded hits such as "Dirty Ol' Man" and "Year of Decision", which went to number 13 in the UK Singles Chart and was certified gold in the Netherlands and Belgium.

The subsequent release of "When Will I See You Again" ensured international recognition when the song became number 1 in the UK charts for two weeks in August 1974 (the first time this had been achieved by an all female group since the Supremes). Following an appearance on Top of the Pops, other countries followed suit and "When Will I See You Again" did extremely well worldwide reaching number 2 in the U.S. where it sold over two million copies and earned the group a gold record in 1974.

The group recorded two live albums in 1975 and a further studio album, The Three Degrees International. This album was called Take Good Care of Yourself in the UK, the title song of which reached the top 10 in the same country. The album itself reached number 6 in the UK Albums Chart.

In 1976, they released the album A Toast of Love (for the Far East market), the title song of which was released internationally. This was the year that Fayette Pinkney left and was replaced by former member Helen Scott. They then released the album Standing Up for Love in 1977.

In 1978 and 1979, they released two disco-styled albums New Dimensions and 3D. From these albums, they had four top 20 hits in the UK with "Givin' Up, Givin' In", "Woman in Love", "The Runner" (co-written by Ferguson) and "My Simple Heart". They also released A Collection of Their 20 Greatest Hits, a compilation album.

The group performed at Prince Charles' 30th birthday party and in 1979 filmed their own TV special The Three Degrees at The Royal Albert Hall with the Royal Philharmonic Orchestra.

In 1980, they released Gold, another compilation album, which reached the top 10 in the UK Album Charts, and in 1982 they recorded a TV show for the BBC, Take Three Degrees, performing their greatest hits. They then released two albums, Album of Love and Live in the UK. The single "Liar" was co-written by Ferguson. In 1985, they released "The Heaven I Need" and "This Is The House", produced by Stock, Aitken and Waterman.

Ferguson left the Three Degrees in 1986 as a result of wanting to spend more time being a mother to take care of her very young daughters of the time. Sheila had mentioned in a 2006 interview that after she gave birth to her daughters, she was still singing and touring with the Three Degrees, but it caused her to limit her availability to her daughters and whenever she came home from her singing projects and tours, her daughters were noticeably clinging onto the nanny, instead of her. Realizing that her long absences from home caused her daughters to become emotionally distant from her, she then made the ultimate decision to leave the group. Additionally, in the 2006 interview, which separately featured Ferguson and Valerie Holiday (other Three Degrees member), it was revealed that in 1986 Ferguson called the other members of the Three Degrees on a phone call to inform she was leaving the group. Both Ferguson and Holiday claimed on their own ends that the phone call conversation ended very abruptly. Holiday commented she was very upset feeling this conversation should have been in person, and not on a phone call. She commented that it was very difficult finding someone to replace Ferguson in the group, which eventually they did, but Holiday permanently took over Ferguson's former spot as the lead singer of the group, and has been in this current role since her departure. Since then, Ferguson has had very limited contact with the Three Degrees and she has never made any public appearances with them. Though in a 2011 interview with the Three Degrees on the British TV show Lorraine, they mentioned that because they and Ferguson are from their home city of Philadelphia, they sometimes come back to their home city to visit family and friends and, at times, Ferguson and the Three Degrees members may encounter each other, but very often their encounters with Ferguson are only for short moments and one of the members, Helen Scott, mentioned their occasional encounters with Sheila Ferguson is like ships that pass in the night. Although Ferguson no longer has any professional relational encounters with the Three Degrees, she still will perform hit songs that she originally recorded and sang with the Three Degrees; such as "When Will I See You Again", "Dirty Ol Man", "Year of Decision", "Woman In Love", "Giving Up Giving In", and "Take Good Care Of Yourself". More often she will sing "When Will I See You Again" whenever she performs any of the hits that she originally sang and recorded with the Three Degrees.

In 2019, Ferguson appeared on an interview with Jeremy Vine on his daytime TV show simply called Jeremy Vine where she expressed about how she felt so sorry about leaving The Three Degrees where they were like family, but was not sorry for raising her daughters despite the guilt that was bothering her for all these years. There was a short video clip shown in the interview showing her going for an exercise therapy session where she begins crying out loud saying, "I miss you" referring to missing The Three Degrees. She mentioned that because of the long period of time being with them for 20 years from the 1960s-1980s, it was comparatively like a family and marriage that she just suddenly had to give up creating emotional heartbreaks.

==== Solo ====
In 1994, Ferguson appeared as a solo artist in the UK Singles Chart with her remake of the Three Degrees' hit "When Will I See You Again". It spent one week in that listing at number 60.

In 2004, Ferguson released her debut solo album A New Kind of Medicine. She is also a lead on the original cast recording of Always and recorded two other albums Misty Blue...and More and Songs from Oh! What a Night.

She featured in Star Alliance's recording of "He's a Runner" in 2006 and recorded "Fool of the Year" for the album Disco 2008, produced by Ian Levine.

Ferguson has performed in multiple soul legend tours and appeared as the Acid Queen at the 50th anniversary of The Who at the O2 Shepherd's Bush Empire in November 2014.

She starred in David Gest's (I've Had) the Time of My Life Tour! across September and October 2015, culminating in a performance at the Connaught Rooms, London, followed by performing at "The Legends of Soul Weekender" with Mary Wilson, Thelma Houston, Gwen Dickey and Jaki Graham in Skegness.

In June 2016, Ferguson performed in a series of soul gigs ("A Night of Soul") in Cyprus with Andy Abraham.

=== Theatre ===
Ferguson has starred in numerous musicals and pantomimes in the UK.

Her first musical was Always in 1997 at the Victoria Palace, London, which also starred Shani Wallis. She then starred in Soul Train (The Musical), Oh What a Night, playing Roxia, and Thoroughly Modern Millie (musical), playing Muzzy Van Hossmere.

In 2005, Ferguson starred in the premiere of the West End musical Behind the Iron Mask at the Duchess Theatre and then toured in Hot Flush, a musical based on the menopause. In 2008, she starred in Sister Act-Songs from the Film.

In 2010, Ferguson joined the cast of the Irish National Tour of Fame the Musical playing the strict head teacher Miss Sherman.

Most recently she starred in the West End musical celebration Respect La Diva at the Garrick Theatre and in Daddy Cool as Pearl.

Ferguson also appeared as the Fairy Godmother and Wicked Queen in numerous pantomimes, including Dick Whittington, Cinderella, Aladdin, and Beauty and the Beast.

From December 2012 to January 2013, Ferguson appeared in Cinderella at the Nottingham Theatre Royal as the Fairy Godmother, a role she reprised at the Theatre Royal Norwich from December 2013 to January 2014. She then starred as the Wicked Queen in Beauty and the Beast at the Theatre Royal, Windsor from December 2014 to January 2015, followed by appearing as the Fairy Godmother in Cinderella at The Sands Centre, Carlisle in December 2015.

Ferguson headlined Ipswich Regent Theatre's pantomime, playing the Wicked Fairy in Sleeping Beauty from December 2016 to January 2017. In February of 2022, she announced she would be casting in the musical, Chicago.

=== Television ===
Ferguson is the first and only black woman to star in her own sitcom in the UK. She played the lead role in the TV sitcom Land of Hope and Gloria, which ran for six episodes in 1992 and was her first acting venture. She also wrote and sang the title song for the series. Although a second series was planned, the idea was shelved after the death of co-star Joan Sanderson.

She has appeared in the British sitcom Desmond's, playing nightclub owner Rochelle Jackson, and the British soap opera Brookside, playing Susan Robinson.

Ferguson was a panelist in Les Dawson's first hosting of the quiz show Blankety Blank in 1984 and has appeared on the TV show Never Mind the Buzzcocks several times, three times as a panelist and once dressed as a pirate in the celebrity line up. She also appeared on Comic Relief in Da Bungalow.

In 2004 Ferguson was a contestant on the fourth series of I'm a Celebrity... Get Me Out of Here!, followed by being a contestant in the first series of Celebrity MasterChef in 2006. In May 2011, she starred in the second series of Channel 4s Celebrity Five Go To, in which the celebrities visited South Africa.

She has appeared as a celebrity contestant on The Weakest Link, Who Wants to Be a Millionaire? and Pointless Celebrities (in both 2013 and 2014).

Ferguson appeared in the second BBC series of The Real Marigold Hotel, and spent a month in India with seven other celebrities.

== Presenter ==
Ferguson presented the documentary The Philadelphia Records Story for Smooth FM in the UK on March 22, 2009.

On April 11, 2012, Ferguson co-hosted Newcastle-based charity, Toma Fund's Eurovision Reunited event..

== Author ==
In 1989, Ferguson published a cook book inspired by recipes from her African American background, Soul Food: Classic Cuisine from the Deep South. She is the first African American in England to ever publish a cookbook related to Soul food.

== Awards ==
In 2013 Ferguson was awarded the Variety Legends of Industry Award for services to music.

She was awarded an Ethnic Minority Business Foundation national achievement award by the Bank of England and its Governor Eddie George in 1999 and was awarded the City of Compton California Book Award for her book Soul Food: Classic Cuisine from the Deep South.

== Philanthropy ==
Ferguson is a patron of the theatre charity The Music Hall Guild of Great Britain and America and has long been a supporter of the Combined Theatrical Charities taking part in the launch of its Acting for Others campaign in 2003. She has been a patron of the national parenting charity, Parentalk, from 1997, raising over £70K for the charity through celebrity appearances. She is also a supporter of WaterAid and appeared in the 2014 To Be a Girl campaign.

She has appeared on two charity singles, It's a Live-In World for the Anti Heroin Project in 1986, and Give Give Give produced by Paul Hardcastle under the title Disco Aid in 1986, followed by a re-production by Stock, Aitken & Waterman under the title Dance Aid in 1987 to support multiple sclerosis research.

Ferguson has been an active supporter of artists rights through her membership and work for both the Phonographic Performance Ltd and the Performing Rights Society. The board of PPL voted unanimously to make Ferguson a Lifetime Guardian Member of the organisation after merging with the Performing Artists Media Rights Organisation (of which she was a founder member on the original board) in 2006. Prior to the foundation of PAMRA in 1996, “non-featured artists” (including backing musicians and orchestral members) did not receive royalties when their performances were broadcast or played in public. Involved in complex rights negotiations in both the UK and internationally over her decade on the PAMRA board, Ferguson was one of two PAMRA directors to sign the society’s first reciprocal international agreement, that with the Dutch collection society SENA, opening the door to dozens of similar international agreements. By the time of its merger with PPL in 2006, PAMRA had more than 15,000 members and was paying out millions of pounds in royalties to rank-and-file musicians.

She has been an Equity (trade union) Councillor and an events speaker at and on behalf of Equity. Ferguson has also been a judge at the Race in Media Awards on several occasions.

She has been an Ambassador for The Prince's Trust since 2008.

== Personal life ==
After marrying property businessman Chris Robinson in 1980, Ferguson settled in Bray, Berkshire. Ferguson and Robinson had twin daughters, Alicia and Alexandria, before divorcing in 2004. From sometime in 2005 until 2010, she temporarily resided in Mallorca with her partner Jonathan Curry who was a theatre technician who was roughly 20 years her junior. Because of his sudden death in 2010 from health complications related to drug use, she has since returned to England and has been single since. She has commented in some interviews that because her encounter with Prince Charles back in the 1970s, which created media attention in England, this lasting media impression made it difficult for her to find new relationships after her divorce.

== Discography ==
=== The Three Degrees ===
Title	Album details	Peak chart positions								Certifications and sales
Title	Album details	US	US R&B	AUS	CAN	GER	JPN	NL	UK	Certifications and sales
Maybe	Released: July 1970; Label: Roulette; Formats: LP	139	16	—	—	—	61 (Note: Charted in 1974)	—	—	JPN: 12,900
The Three Degrees	Released: October 1973; Label: Philadelphia International; Formats: LP, MC, 8-track	28	33	46	55	31	7	—	11	JPN: 166,700; UK: Gold
International	Released: February 7, 1975; Label: Philadelphia International; Formats: LP, MC, 8-track; Released in the UK as Take Good Care of Yourself and in Europe as With Love	99	31	86	—	—	3	—	6	JPN: 189,530; UK: Gold
A Toast of Love	Released: May 21, 1976; Label: CBS/Sony; Formats: LP; Japan-only release	—	—	—	—	—	21	—	—	JPN: 28,590
Standing Up for Love	Released: February 1977; Label: Epic; Formats: LP, MC	—	—	—	—	—	—	—	—	
New Dimensions	Released: October 1978; Label: Ariola; Formats: LP, MC	169	—	97	—	—	—	32	34	UK: Silver
3D	Released: October 12, 1979; Label: Ariola; Formats: LP, MC	—	—	—	—	—	—	—	61	
Album of Love	Released: 1982; Label: Self-released; Formats: LP; UK-only release	—	—	—	—	—	—	—	—	
"—" denotes releases that did not chart or were not released in that territory.

== Theatre ==
- 1992: Bobby Davro: Summer Season
- 1996: Rock with Laughter (Cannon & Ball)
- 1997: Always
- 2000/1: Soul Train (The Musical)
- 2002/3: Oh! What a Night
- 2003/4: Thoroughly Modern Millie
- 2005: Behind the Iron Mask
- 2006: Cinderella (pantomime)
- 2007: Hot Flush
- 2007: The Songs of Sister Act
- 2007: Snow White (pantomime)
- 2008: Aladdin (pantomime)
- 2009: Dick Whittington (pantomime)
- 2010: Fame, The Musical
- 2011: The Hot 100 (Dubai)
- 2011: Respect La Diva
- 2011: Cinderella (pantomime)
- 2012: Daddy Cool
- 2012: The Music & Magic Ball
- 2012: Cinderella (pantomime)
- 2013/14: David Gest's Soul Legends Live
- 2013: Cinderella (pantomime)
- 2014: Beauty and the Beast (pantomime)
- 2018: Dick Whittington (pantomime)

== Filmography ==
=== Film ===
- 1970: The French Connection

=== Television ===
- 1992: Land of Hope and Gloria
- 1992: Brookside
- 1992: Desmonds
