= The Three Degrees Live =

Live album by the Three Degrees
- Released: 1976
- Recorded: 1975
- Venue: Bailey's, Leicester, England
- Genre: R&B
- Label: Philadelphia International
- Producer: Bobby Martin

The Three Degrees chronology
International (1975)	The Three Degrees Live (1976)	A Toast of Love (1976)

The Three Degrees Live is a 1976 live album by Philadelphia-based female vocal trio the Three Degrees who scored major international success with "When Will I See You Again". The album charted at number 34 in the US R&B Album chart and at number 199 in the Billboard Top 200.

During a UK tour in 1975, the Three Degrees performed at Bailey's in Leicester, England, and the evening's concert was recorded and subsequently released by Philadelphia International Records as The Three Degrees Live. The setlist for the concert was typical of what the group was doing at that time; a blend of pop, soul and show tunes. Aside from the group's biggest hits to date, cover versions of songs by Stevie Wonder ("Living for the City"), Elton John ("Don't Let the Sun Go Down On Me") were performed, as well as a rendition of the Jimmy Webb penned track "Everybody Gets to Go the Moon" from the film The French Connection.

The album was re-issued on CD in 2010 by Demon Music Group on the Edsel label and features the original artwork. The original vinyl release credits the recording to be taken from a performance at Bailey's, London, England. This credit has been corrected on the digital re-issue.

== Track listing ==
1. "TSOP (The Sound of Philadelphia)" (Kenneth Gamble, Leon Huff) – 3:51
2. "Free Ride" (Dan Hartman) – 2:50
3. "Don't Let the Sun Go Down on Me" (Elton John, Bernie Taupin) – 5:02
4. "Year of Decision" (Kenneth Gamble, Leon Huff) – 2:49
5. "Living for the City" (Stevie Wonder) / "For The Love of Money" (Kenneth Gamble, Leon Huff) – 8:39
6. "When Will I See You Again?" (Kenneth Gamble, Leon Huff) – 4:47
7. "Dirty Ol' Man" (Kenneth Gamble, Leon Huff) – 4:27
8. "Everybody Gets to Go the Moon" (Jimmy Webb) – 4:18
9. "Harlem" (Bill Withers) – 3:16
10. "Love Train" (Kenneth Gamble, Leon Huff) – 6:39

== Personnel ==
- Sheila Ferguson – vocals
- Valerie Holiday – vocals
- Fayette Pinkney – vocals

=== Production credits ===
- Bobby Martin – producer
- Arthur Freeman – arranger
- Derick Warne – arranger
- Richard Barrett – conductor
