= After Henry (radio series) =

Radio show (1985–1989)

- Cover of the After Henry novel
- Genre: Situation comedy
- Running time: 30 minutes
- Country of origin: United Kingdom
- Language: English
- Home station: BBC Radio 4
- TV adaptations: After Henry
- Starring: Prunella Scales; Joan Sanderson; Benjamin Whitrow; Gerry Cowper
- Created by: Simon Brett
- Written by: Simon Brett
- Produced by: Pete Atkin
- Original release: 17 April 1985 – 6 March 1989
- No. of series: 4
- No. of episodes: 34
- Audio format: Stereophonic sound
- Opening theme: Three-Quarter Blues, George Gershwin
- Ending theme: Impromptu in Two Keys, George Gershwin
- Website: BBC Comedy Entry

After Henry is a British sitcom written by Simon Brett. It started on BBC Radio 4 and later moved to television. Prunella Scales and Joan Sanderson starred in both radio and television versions.

A novel, also by Simon Brett, followed the series.

== Cast ==
- Prunella Scales – Sarah France
- Joan Sanderson – Eleanor Prescott
- Gerry Cowper – Clare France
- Benjamin Whitrow – Russell Bryant

== Plot ==
Sarah France is the 42-year-old widow of a GP, Henry. She lives in an often volatile family situation with her mother, Eleanor Prescott, and her daughter, eighteen-year-old Clare France. After Henry's death, the three generations of women have to cope with one another as best they can, under their shared roof.

Sarah often finds herself in the middle of things, usually figuratively but always literally, as her mother lives upstairs and her daughter has the downstairs flat. Eleanor, ruthlessly cunning and emotionally manipulative, takes every opportunity to get one over on Sarah. Anything told to Eleanor will spread quickly throughout the extensive "geriatric mafia", the elderly of the area. Clare is trying to be independent of her mother, though often has to come running back in times of crisis.

The relationships among the three women change constantly through each episode. Sometimes mother and daughter ally against grandmother, sometimes mother and grandmother go against daughter, but usually grandmother and granddaughter gang up on the long-suffering Sarah, whose one haven is Bygone Books, the remarkably unsuccessful second-hand bookshop where she works for Russell, who dispenses in turn sympathy and wisdom. Most of the time, Russell sees the women's relationships second-hand through Sarah, although he isn't opposed to taking the occasional more active role when necessary. In turn, Sarah can see some of Russell's difficulties of living with a gay partner in 1980s London suburbia, while at the same time seeing Russell's relationship as the one perfect marriage she knows.

== Episode list ==
Series	Episode	Title	First broadcast
1	1	The Older Man	17 April 1985
1	2	Moving	24 April 1985
1	3	The Cowboy	1 May 1985
1	4	The Dinner Party	8 May 1985
1	5	Gossip	15 May 1985
1	6	Mr Right	22 May 1985
1	7	The Spectre at the Feast	29 May 1985
1	8	Going Away	5 June 1985
Special	1	A Week of Sundays	22 December 1985
2	1	Memory Games	16 August 1986
2	2	The Romantic Approach	23 August 1986
2	3	The Cold	30 August 1986
2	4	Bedside Manners	6 September 1986
2	5	The Kitten	13 September 1986
2	6	The Married Man	20 September 1986
2	7	The Other Married Man	27 September 1986
2	8	The Teapot	4 October 1986
3	1	Wedding Bells	22 September 1987
3	2	Poor Relations	29 September 1987
3	3	Guilty Secrets	6 October 1987
3	4	Lines of Communications	13 October 1987
3	5	Intellectual Aspirations	20 October 1987
3	6	A Box of Chocolates	27 October 1987
3	7	Different Viewpoints	3 November 1987
3	8	The End of a Chapter	10 November 1987
Special	2	The Season of Relative Goodwill	25 December 1987
4	1	Dependent Relatives	17 January 1989
4	2	Relative Movement	24 January 1989
4	3	A Fully Extended Family	31 January 1989
4	4	Sunday Lunch	7 February 1989
4	5	Little Women	14 February 1989
4	6	Family Album	21 February 1989
4	7	Keeping Faith	28 February 1989
4	8	Positive Thinking	6 March 1989

== Transfer to television ==
The BBC was reluctant to produce After Henry for television, so in 1988 after the third radio series Thames Television did so. Prunella Scales and Joan Sanderson returned as Sarah and Eleanor, but Gerry Cowper was, at the age of 30, considered too old to play Clare and was replaced by Janine Wood. Benjamin Whitrow was replaced in the role of Russell by Jonathan Newth. The show was popular, attracting over 14 million viewers. A second television series was shown during the same months as the fourth radio series with, in many cases, both radio and television episodes being broadcast on the same nights. The fourth television series was broadcast from July 1992, after the death of Joan Sanderson, who had died on 24 May.
