= Santa Esmeralda discography =

- Studio albums: 11
- Compilation albums: 7
- Singles: 15

This is the discography of American-French-Spanish disco group Santa Esmeralda.

== Albums ==
=== Studio albums ===
Title	Album details	Peak chart positions									
Title	Album details	AUS	AUT	CAN	FRA	GER	IT	NL	SPA	SWE	US
Don't Let Me Be Misunderstood	Released: September 1977; Label: Philips, Casablanca; Formats: LP, MC, 8-track	14	2	29	1	1	1	1	8	10	25
The House of the Rising Sun	Released: January 1978; Label: Philips, Casablanca; Formats: LP, MC, 8-track	70	4	32	3	24	4	12	10	—	41
Beauty	Released: July 1978; Label: Philips, Casablanca; Formats: LP, MC, 8-track	—	—	—	22	—	—	—	—	—	141
Another Cha-Cha	Released: August 1979; Label: Philips, Casablanca; Formats: LP, MC	—	—	—	—	—	—	—	—	—	—
Don't Be Shy Tonight	Released: April 1980; Label: Casablanca, WEA; Formats: LP, MC	—	—	—	—	—	—	—	—	—	—
Hush	Released: 1981; Label: Casablanca, Fauves Puma; Formats: LP	—	—	—	—	—	—	—	—	—	—
Green Talisman	Released: 1982; Label: Polydor; Formats: LP, MC	—	—	—	—	—	—	—	—	—	—
Don't Let Me Be Misunderstood	Released: 6 November 2000; Label: Ariola Express; Formats: CD	—	—	—	—	—	—	—	—	—	—
Lay Down My Love	Released: 2002; Label: Just Watch; Formats: CD	—	—	—	—	—	—	—	—	—	—
The Greatest Hits	Released: 3 February 2004; Label: Empire Musicwerks; Formats: CD; Re-recordings	—	—	—	—	—	—	—	—	—	—
Don't Let Me Be Misunderstood	Released: 3 October 2005; Label: Pazzazz; Formats: 2xCD; Re-recordings	—	—	—	—	—	—	—	—	—	—
"—" denotes releases that did not chart or were not released in that territory.

=== Compilation albums ===
Title	Album details
The Very Best of Santa Esmeralda	Released: 1978; Label: Philips; Formats: LP; Japan-only release
Santa Esmeralda	Released: 1980; Label: Impact/Fauves Puma; Formats: LP; France-only release
Best of Santa Esmeralda	Released: 1987; Label: Philips; Formats: CD, MC
The Best of Santa Esmeralda	Released: 1993; Label: Dig It, Versailles; Formats: CD, MC
The Best of Santa Esmeralda – You're My Everything	Released: 15 December 1994; Label: Fauves Puma/Hot Productions; Formats: CD; US-only release
Best of Santa Esmeralda	Released: 3 February 2003; Label: Universe; Formats: CD; Germany-only release
I Successi	Released: 4 November 2004; Label: D.V. More Record; Formats: CD, MC; Italy-only release

== Singles ==
Title	Year	Peak chart positions										Album
Title	Year	AUS	AUT	CAN	FRA	GER	NL	SPA	UK	US	US Dance	Album
"Don't Let Me Be Misunderstood"	1977	7	1	10	2	1	4	6	41	15	4	Don't Let Me Be Misunderstood
"The House of the Rising Sun"	1977	75	13	—	52	27	20	16	—	78	19	The House of the Rising Sun
"The Wages of Sin"	1978	—	—	—	40	—	—	—	—	—	—	Beauty
"Learning the Game"	1978	—	—	—	—	—	—	—	—	—	—	Beauty
"Another Cha-Cha"	1979	—	—	—	68	—	—	—	—	—	16	Another Cha-Cha
"C'est Magnifique"	1980	—	—	—	69	—	—	—	—	—	60	Don't Be Shy Tonight
"Don't Be Shy Tonight"	1980	—	—	—	—	—	—	—	—	—	—	Don't Be Shy Tonight
"Hush"	1981	—	—	—	—	—	—	—	—	—	—	Hush
"Things We Cannot Change"	1981	—	—	—	—	—	—	—	—	—	—	Hush
"You're My Everything"	1982	—	—	—	—	—	—	—	—	—	—	Don't Let Me Be Misunderstood
"Green Talisman"	1982	—	—	—	—	—	—	—	—	—	—	Green Talisman
"Don't Let Me Be Misunderstood" (New Original Version 86)	1986	—	—	—	—	—	—	—	—	—	—	Don't Let Me Be Misunderstood
"Don't Let Me Be Misunderstood" (Remix 93)	1993	—	—	—	—	—	—	—	—	—	—	The Best of Santa Esmeralda
"Don't Let Me Be Misunderstood" (Remix 2000)	2000	—	—	—	—	—	—	—	—	—	—	Non-album single
"Bed of Love"	2004	—	—	—	—	—	—	—	—	—	—	Lay Down My Love
"—" denotes releases that did not chart or were not released in that territory.
