= Rozlyne Clarke =

Australian make-up artist

- Also known as: Roslyne Clarke; Rozlyne Vidal
- Born: Roslyn Elisabeth Howell; 9 July 1967 (age 59)
- Origin: Sydney, New South Wales, Australia
- Genre: Eurodance
- Occupations: Singer; actor; make up artist
- Instrument: Voice
- Years active: 1987–2021
- Labels: Airplay records, Carrere recorda, Scorpio music
- Website: rozlynevidal.com

Rozlyne Clarke (born Roslyn Elisabeth Howell, 9 July 1967) is an Australian make-up artist who also had a career as a musical theatre actor and dance music singer. From 1990 she was based in Europe, where she had three top 20 hits on the French Singles Chart, with "Eddy Steady Go" (No. 8, November 1990), "Gorgeous" (May 1991) and "Dancin' Is Like Makin' Love" (November). "Eddy Steady Go" also reached the top 30 on the Belgian Ultratop 50 Singles (Flemish chart). After 1997 Clarke focussed on providing make-up; she returned to Australia and works as Rozlyne Vidal. She has also continued to perform as a Musical Theatre artist and worked with Opera Australia for 6 consecutive seasons as an actress. She is also a Teacher of Make-up. Productions as a performer in Australia include "Sheila" Chorus Line, "Reno Sweeney" Anything Goes, "Aurora" Kiss of the Spiderwoman, "Sister Robert Anne" Nunsense, "The Official" Wicked, "Paula" Catch me if you can, "Fairy Godmother" Cinderella, "Aunt March" Little Woman.

== Biography ==
Rozlyne Clarke, as Roslyn Elisabet Howell, was born in 1967 and raised in Sydney. She took dance and singing lessons in her adolescence. She gained a part in the Australian version of the musical comedy, Sugar Babies, with its first performance at Her Majesty's Theatre, Melbourne in January 1987. She appeared as Ashley in the Australasian tour of the rock musical, Starlight Express, which also toured Japan and Germany.

=== Early musical career ===
In 1989, Clarke was playing the part of Bombalurina in the famous musical Cats. During a performance in Paris she caught the eye of French producer Nicolas Skorsky who was looking for a vocalist for a dance track he had just written. Rozlyne recorded the song in one day and left for London to perform the part of Rizzo in Grease. The song called Eddy Steady Go was released in late 1990 and became an instant club smash reaching #1 on the French club play chart. Skorsky called Rozlyne and asked her to come back to Paris in order to do the promotion of the song and to record a full album. A video was made and Rozlyne started to perform in clubs and on various French TV shows. The song reached #8 in the French single chart and remains Rozlyne Clarke's biggest hit to date. The song was also released in the Benelux but also in Japan and in the United States under Atlantic Records. However the song did only get a promotional release in the USA but enjoyed a little success in clubs. In 1991, Clarke released her second single entitled Gorgeous which is also the title of her debut album. The album originally only contained 8 tracks all produced by Eddy Beatboxking aka Walter Taieb and Skorsky. The album is not a 100% dance album as it also contains beautiful ballads and mid-tempo tracks showing Rozlyne's powerful voice and perfect abilities to sing sad love songs. The song Gorgeous was not as successful as Eddy Steady Go but was another hit for Rozlyne Clarke in France reaching #8 on the French club play chart and #19 on the French single chart. The song was also available on a promo 12 inch in the United States with a couple of new remixes. A video was made where Rozlyne is definitely looking "gorgeous".

In late 1991, her third single was released called Dancing Is Like Making Love. The song became an instant club hit in France reaching #2 in the club play chart. In term of sales, the song was also another hit despite the fact that no video was made for that single. It peaked at #16. As her two previous singles, Dancing Is Like Making Love was also released in the Benelux but strangely, ARS, the Belgian label, decided to release a totally different version of the song. Even the sleeve of the single was totally changed! Her album Gorgeous was also released there with one more track compared to the original French release adding the song "Never started loving you" which was the B-side in France of Dancing Is Like Making Love. At that time, Clarke was one of the most famous dance female singer in France along with Indra; also produced by Walter Taieb, besides, both singers had the same record company, Carrere. A fourth single from the Gorgeous album was released in France in 1992 The Wizard Of Roz, one of Rozlyne's favorite track as it was dedicated to her dad and she had co-written it. However, the song was not well distributed being only available in a few music stores and for a very limited time; consequently it was a total flop.

Surprisingly, only three years after the original release of Eddy Steady Go, Belgian Remixers Unity Power decided to remix Rozlyne's biggest hit. The new remix got a good club impact and was released as a single in 1993. It gave a second birth to this song. The Unity Power Remix reached #4 in the French club play chart and #44 in the French single chart. After this surprising success, Unity Power decided to do the same with Clarke's second biggest hit Dancing Is Like Making Love. The remix version was released in 1994. This was another club success in Belgium and France reaching #8 in the French club play chart.

=== Later musical career ===
After the success of the Unity Power mixes, Clarke was then produced in Belgium and signed a record deal with ARS to release another album. This second album called Faithful to you is a pure Eurodance album as there were many in the mid-1990s and unfortunately, the little something of her previous dance singles was not there to offer another big hit. However, 4 singles were released from that album between 1994 and 1996: Giving Up, Giving In, a remake of The Three Degrees, Take My Hand, Knockin' Me Out and I Wanna See You. All did a decent club success but did not managed to go as high as Rozlyne's first hits though she promoted the songs the best she could. The singles sold poorly and the album Faithful To You, which only remained available in Belgium, did not sell well.

In late 1996, Clarke returned to France which was like her second home and released another dance track called I need you. The song reached #20 in the French club play chart. The same year, she also released the song Ecoute Bien Ces Mots also available in English under the title "Got To Find The Light"; this single was actually a duet with Tony Jones and was released under the name Let-Motiv. This song was another club success for Clarke but it did not sell much.

The last musical effort of Clarke came in 1997 with the release of a dance remake of the Sheila track Quel Tempérament De Feu which was also recorded in English under the title I'm On Fire (as per the original version by 5 000 Volts). This song was not released commercially but was another top 20 hit in the French club play chart.

Clarke also recorded numerous unreleased songs with French producer Jean-Baptiste Saudray.

=== Personal life ===
Clarke is married and lives in Australia working as a professional make-up artist.

== Discography ==
=== Albums ===
- Gorgeous (1991)
- Faithful to You (1995)

=== Singles ===
Year	Song	French	French Club Play Chart	Album
1990	"Eddy Steady Go"	8	1	Gorgeous
1991	"Gorgeous"	19	8	Gorgeous
1991	"Dancing Is Like Making Love"	16	2	Gorgeous
1992	"The Wizard Of Roz (to my dad)"	-	26	Gorgeous
1993	"Eddy Steady Go (Unity Power Remix)"	44	4	Gorgeous (Re-issue)
1994	"Dancing Is Like Making Love (Unity Power Remix)"	-	8	Gorgeous (Re-issue)
1994	"Giving Up, Giving In"	-	-	Faithful To You
1995	"Take My Hand"	-	17	Faithful To You
1995	"Knockin' Me Out"	-	20	Faithful To You
1996	"I Wanna See You"	-	-	Faithful To You
1996	"I Need You"	-	20	-
1996	"Ecoute Bien Ces Mots" (as Let-Motiv)	-	4	-
1997	"Quel Tempérament De Feu / I'm On Fire" (promo only)	-	17	-
