= Bricka =

Bricka is a surname. Notable people with the surname include:

- Carl Frederik Bricka (1845–1903), Danish archivist, historian, and writer
- Rémy Bricka (born 1949), French musician and singer
