= The Three Degrees at The Royal Albert Hall =

The Three Degrees at The Royal Albert Hall was a 1980 television special produced by the BBC. It was a live concert performance by the American female vocal trio the Three Degrees, who were backed by the London Philharmonic Orchestra at London's Royal Albert Hall on 8 October 1979. This was the Three Degrees' second television special.

== Overview ==
The show was based around the promotion of the group's latest album 3D, which had been released by European record label Ariola just prior to the engagement. Six songs from the concert went on to form side two of the group's Gold album released the following year. When the concert was televised it had been edited down and several songs that were on the album were not televised. Likewise, several songs from the television airing did not make it onto the album.

== The television special ==
1. "If My Friends Could See Me Now"
2. "Stardust"
3. "Jump The Gun"
4. "Red Light"
5. "Woman in Love"
6. "Giving Up, Giving In"
7. "Starlight"
8. "Beatles Medley"
9. "We Are Family"
10. "When Will I See You Again"

== The Gold Album ==
The album, released by Ariola in 1980, featured seven songs from the group's two previous album releases with that record label on side one, and six live tracks from the concert on side two. Listed below are the live tracks only:

Side Two

1. "Brand New Day"
2. "You Light Up My Life"
3. "If My Friends Could See Me Now"
4. "Stardust"
5. "I'll Never Love This Way Again"
6. "We Are Family"

== Personnel ==
- Sheila Ferguson – vocals
- Valerie Holiday – vocals
- Helen Scott – vocals
- The London Philharmonic Orchestra (conducted by John Coleman).
- The 3 Degrees personal rhythm section musicians:
- Kevin Savigar – piano
- Pete Kelly – synthesiser/keyboards
- Paul Hodgeson – guitar
- Dougie Henning – bass guitar
- Roy Jones – drums
- Duncan Kinnell – percussion
