= Leroy Gómez =

American singer and songwriter

- Born: July 8, 1950 (age 76); Wareham, Massachusetts, U.S.
- Genres: Salsa, Disco
- Occupation: musician
- Instruments: saxophone, vocals

Leroy Gómez (born July 8, 1950) is an American singer-songwriter, best known for his work with 1970s disco and latin music act Santa Esmeralda.

== Biography ==
Leroy Gómez was born in 1950 in Wareham, Massachusetts of Cape Verdean descent.

== Career as saxophonist and in Tavares ==
After learning how to sing and play the saxophone, Gómez started his own band at 14, and later joined Tavares, a local group of brothers who shared his Cape Verdean heritage, and with whom he would go on to tour in North America and Europe.

=== Work with Elton John in Paris ===
In Paris, Elton John invited him to play the sax on “Social Disease”, a song on his 1973 album Goodbye Yellow Brick Road. Amidst this success, Gómez decided to leave his band, Tavares, and remain in Europe, getting work as a session player in Paris.

=== Work with Nicolas Skorsky and Jean Manuel de Scarano: Fauves Puma label ===
In Paris he met Nicolas Skorsky and Jean Manuel de Scarano, songwriters who had launched their own label with the aim of producing artists who would record their compositions. Santa Esmeralda was born of their collaboration, and the album Don't Let Me Be Misunderstood, with Gómez on lead vocals, debuted on the independent French label, Fauves Puma. A sudden huge success in Europe, the record was picked up for worldwide distribution by Casablanca Records of Los Angeles, the preeminent label of the Disco era.

Santa Esmeralda was essentially a studio act, but Gómez was eager to perform, and a touring group was put together. It included a troupe of dancers, one of whom, by the name of Tequila, would appear on several album and single cover photos and ultimately become his wife.

=== Success with Gypsy Woman and I Got It Bad ===
Leroy Gómez left "Santa Esmeralda" in early 1978 to perform as a solo artist and recorded two albums: Gypsy Woman (Casablanca Records, 1978) and I Got It Bad (Casablanca, 1979).
