= Land of Hope and Gloria =

British TV programme

- Created by: Simon Brett
- Starring: Sheila Ferguson
- Country of origin: United Kingdom
- Original language: English
- No. of series: 1
- No. of episodes: 6

Production
- Running time: 30 mins.
- Production company: Thames Television

Original release
- Network: ITV
- Release: 24 June – 29 July 1992

Land of Hope and Gloria is a British sitcom starring Sheila Ferguson, which aired for six episodes on ITV in 1992.

== Plot ==
Gloria Hepburn is a leisure manager from the United States who is appointed as the new business manager of Beaumont House, a stately home of Gerald Hope-Beaumont.

Gloria is brought to improve the finances of the business. She encounters a culture clash, particularly from Evelyn Spurling and Nancy Princeton who like to do things in an old fashioned British manner.

== Cast ==
- Sheila Ferguson as Gloria Hepburn
- Joan Sanderson (died 24 May 1992) as Nancy Princeton
- Andrew Bicknell as Gerald Hope-Beaumont
- Daphne Oxenford as Evelyn Spurling
- Vivien Darke as Vanessa
- John Rapley as Crompton

== Reception ==
The show was critically panned. It was considered one of the worst British sitcoms ever made.
