= Woman in Love (Three Degrees song) =

1977 single by Twiggy

Single by The Three Degrees

from the album New Dimensions
- B-side: "Out of Love Again"
- Released: 5 January 1979 (UK); February 1979 (US)
- Recorded: 1978
- Genre: Soul
- Length: 5:16 (album track); 4:09 (UK single edit); 3:57 (US single edit)
- Label: Ariola
- Songwriters: Frank Musker; Dominic Bugatti
- Producer: Giorgio Moroder

The Three Degrees singles chronology
"Giving Up, Giving In" (1978)	"Woman in Love" (1979)	"The Runner" (1979)

"Woman in Love" is a romantic ballad which afforded the Three Degrees a top-ten UK hit in 1979.

== Composition and Twiggy recording ==
"Woman in Love" was written by Frank Musker and Dominic Bugatti around the time of the March–April 1977 UK top-ten tenure of the Mary MacGregor hit "Torn Between Two Lovers", which according to Musker provided the template for "Woman in Love". Three Degrees lead vocalist Sheila Ferguson would be amazed that Musker and Bugatti could so convincingly express the feminine viewpoint evinced in their song's lyrics, to which Musker's response was: "She failed to realise…that the words of Woman In Love were the words that most men would like to hear their woman say."

The song's first recording was by Twiggy, which was released as a single in May 1977 entitled "A Woman in Love". Performed by Twiggy on the 2 June 1977 broadcast of Top of the Pops, the track would garner sufficient interest for an eighth place ranking on the "Star Breakers" list of singles just below the UK Top 50 dated 18 June 1977, but would fail to rise any higher.

== The Three Degrees version ==
After being unsuccessfully pitched to Sandie Shaw, "Woman in Love" was in 1978 placed with the Three Degrees to record as the one slow-tempo number for their album New Dimensions, recorded that summer in both London and Los Angeles with disco maven Giorgio Moroder, with "Woman in Love" being one of the three album tracks recorded in Los Angeles. The dance track "Giving Up, Giving In" was issued as the lead single from New Dimensions before the album was completed, that single being rush-released in the UK in August 1978 and reaching #12 on the UK chart.

"Woman in Love" would serve as the album's second single with a UK release on 5 January 1979, with Ariola evidently waiting out the pre-Christmas period when product by lower-profile recording artists tended to be overlooked. Debuting at #64 on the UK Top 75 singles chart dated 13 January 1979 – the chart immediately subsequent to its single release – "Woman in Love" rose in its second and third charting weeks to respectively #18 and #5, followed by a three week #3 chart peak tenure on the chart from 3–17 February, and thus established itself as the Three Degrees' runner-up UK career record, bested only by their 1974 #1 hit "When Will I See You Again".

In the United States, "Woman in Love" had been utilized as the B-side for the November single release of "Giving Up, Giving In", with the latter title having become a comparatively minor hit reaching No. 39 on the R&B chart in Billboard magazine. Released in the US as an A-side single in February 1979, "Woman in Love" would statistically best "Giving Up, Giving In" with a No. 24 R&B peak but also fail to reestablish the Three Degrees as current R&B hitmakers, in fact becoming the group's final R&B chart appearance. "Woman in Love" did afford the Three Degrees a third and final appearance on Billboard's Adult Contemporary top 50 ranking, albeit rising no higher than No. 50.

=== Track listings ===
7": Ariola / ARO 141 (UK)

1. "Woman in Love" – 4:09
2. "Out of Love Again" – 3:55

7": Ariola / 7742 (US)

1. "Woman in Love" – 3:57
2. "Out of Love Again" – 3:55

=== Charts ===
==== Weekly charts ====
Chart (1979)	Peak position
Australia (Kent Music Report)	56
Ireland (IRMA)	6
UK Singles (Official Charts)	3
US Hot R&B/Hip Hop Songs (Billboard)	27
US Adult Contemporary (Billboard)	50

==== Year-end charts ====
Chart (1979)	Peak position
UK Singles (OCC)	24

=== Certifications ===
Region	Certification	Certified units/sales
United Kingdom (BPI)	Gold	500,000^{^}
^{^} Shipments figures based on certification alone.

== Other versions ==
Apart from the original version by Twiggy, the song was also recorded in 1977 - as "A Woman in Love" - by Chelsia Chan for her album Because of You. A 1979 single release for Kasey Cisyk - as "A Woman in Love" - the song was also recorded by Sharifah Aini for her 1979 covers album Woman in Love.
