= International (The Three Degrees album) =

Studio album by The Three Degrees
- Released: June 1975
- Recorded: 1973–1975
- Studios: Sigma Sound, Philadelphia, Pennsylvania
- Genres: Philadelphia soul; funk; disco
- Length: 37:46
- Label: Philadelphia International
- Producers: Kenneth Gamble & Leon Huff; Richard Barrett

The Three Degrees chronology
The Three Degrees Live in Japan (1975)	International (1975)	The Three Degrees Live (1976)

Professional ratings
Review scores
Source	Rating
Allmusic	2.5/5 stars

International is a 1975 studio album released by the group The Three Degrees.

The album includes the 1974 hit single "TSOP (The Sound of Philadelphia)". In the United Kingdom, the album was released under the title Take Good Care of Yourself, where it charted at #6, in Europe the album was issued with the alternative title With Love. The album was also issued in Japan with an alternative running order and several different tracks.

The album was re-issued in October 2010, for the first time in its entirety on CD by Big Break Records. This re-issue includes only foreign language songs previously available in east Asia and a 1977 remix of "TSOP (The Sound of Philadelphia)" by Tom Moulton.

== Track listing ==
All tracks are written by Kenneth Gamble and Leon Huff, except where noted.

Side A
No.	Title	Writer(s)	Length
1.	"Another Heartache"		4:21
2.	"Take Good Care of Yourself"		3:26
3.	"Get Your Love Back"		3:25
4.	"Lonelier Are Fools"	Joseph B. Jefferson; Bruce Hawes; Charles Simmons	4:05
5.	"Distant Lover"	Marvin Gaye; Gwen Gordy Fuqua; Sandra Greene	4:04
Total length:			19:21

Side B
No.	Title	Writer(s)	Length
6.	"Together"		4:35
7.	"Long Lost Lover"	Gamble; Huff; Cary Gilbert	2:58
8.	"Here I Am"	Huff; Gilbert	3:58
9.	"TSOP (The Sound of Philadelphia)"		3:45
10.	"Loving Cup"	Gamble; Huff; Stephanie Andrews	3:09
Total length:			18:25

2010 remastered reissue bonus tracks
No.	Title	Writer(s)	Length
11.	"Midnight Train"	Haruomi Hosono; Takashi Matsumoto	4:04
12.	"Nigai Namida" (Single Version)	Kazumi Yasui; Kyōhei Tsutsumi	3:55
13.	"La Chanson Populaire"	Nicolas Skorsky; Jean-Pierre Bourtayre	3:41
14.	"Somos Novios (It's Impossible)"	Armando Manzanero; Sid Wayne	3:46
15.	"When Will I See You Again" (Japanese Single Version)	Gamble; Huff; Akio Shira	2:49
16.	"TSOP (The Sound of Philadelphia)" (A Tom Moulton Mix)		5:49
Total length:			61:50

=== Japanese Edition ===
Side A
No.	Title	Writer(s)	Length
1.	"Another Heartache"		4:21
2.	"La Chanson Populaire"	Nicolas Skorsky; Jean-Pierre Bourtayre	3:43
3.	"Get Your Love Back"		3:25
4.	"Lonelier Are Fools"	Joseph B. Jefferson; Bruce Hawes; Charles Simmons	4:05
5.	"Somos Novios (It's Impossible)"	Armando Manzanero; Sid Wayne	3:48
6.	"Distant Lover"	Marvin Gaye; Gwen Gordy Fuqua; Sandra Greene	4:04
Total length:			23:26

Side B
No.	Title	Writer(s)	Length
7.	"Together"		4:38
8.	"Nigai Namida"	Kazumi Yasui; Kyōhei Tsutsumi	3:53
9.	"Here I Am"	Huff; Gilbert	3:55
10.	"When Will I See You Again" (Japanese Single Version)	Gamble; Huff; Akio Shira	2:51
11.	"Loving Cup"	Gamble; Huff; Stephanie Andrews	3:52
12.	"Midnight Train"	Haruomi Hosono; Takashi Matsumoto	4:05
Total length:			23:14

== Personnel ==
The Three Degrees

- Sheila Ferguson - vocals
- Valerie Holiday - vocals
- Fayette Pinkney - vocals

Musicians

- Bobby Eli, Norman Harris, Reginald Lucas, Roland Chambers, T. J. Tindall - guitar
- Lenny Pakula, Leon Huff, Eddie Green, Harold Williams - keyboards
- Anthony Jackson, Ronnie Baker - bass
- Earl Young, Karl Chambers, Norman Farrington - drums
- Larry Washington - congas, bongos
- Vince Montana - vibraphone
- Bobby Martin, John Davis, Jack Faith, Lenny Pakula - arrangements

Technology

- Jay Mark, Joe Tarsia - engineer
- Ed Lee - design
- Peter Lavery - photography

== Charts ==
Chart (1975)	Peak positions
Australia (Kent Music Report)	86
Billboard Pop Albums	99
Billboard Top Soul Albums	31
UK Albums Chart	6

=== Singles ===
Year	Single	Peak chart positions			
Year	Single	US	US R&B	US A/C	UK
1974	"TSOP (The Sound of Philadelphia)"	1	1	1	22
1974	"Get Your Love Back"	—	—	—	34
1975	"Take Good Care of Yourself"	—	64	24	9
1975	"Long Lost Lover"	—	—	—	40
