= After Henry (TV series) =

British TV sitcom (1988–1992)

- Genre: Sitcom
- Written by: Simon Brett
- Starring: Prunella Scales; Joan Sanderson; Janine Wood; Jonathan Newth
- Theme music composer: George Gershwin
- Opening theme: "Three-Quarter Blues"
- Country of origin: United Kingdom
- Original language: English
- No. of series: 4
- No. of episodes: 38

Production
- Producers: Peter Frazer-Jones; Bill Shepherd
- Running time: 30 minutes
- Production company: Thames Television

Original release
- Network: ITV
- Release: 4 January 1988 – 24 August 1992

After Henry is a British sitcom that aired on ITV from 4 January 1988 to 24 August 1992. It was based on the radio series of the same name that was broadcast on BBC Radio 4 between 1985 and 1989. Like the radio series, the TV series was written by Simon Brett, and starred Prunella Scales and Joan Sanderson. It was made for the ITV network by Thames Television. The opening and closing music is "Three-Quarter Blues", by George Gershwin.

The BBC was reluctant to produce After Henry for television, so in 1988 after the third radio series Thames Television did so. The show was surprisingly popular, attracting over 14 million viewers. A second television series was shown during the same months as the fourth radio series with, in many cases, both radio and television episodes being broadcast on the same nights. The fourth television series was broadcast from July 1992, after the death of Joan Sanderson, who had died on 24 May.

== Cast ==
- Prunella Scales – Sarah France
- Joan Sanderson – Eleanor Prescott
- Janine Wood – Clare France
- Jonathan Newth – Russell Bryant
- Fanny Rowe – Vera Poling (Series 1)
- Peggy Ann Wood – Vera Poling (Series 2–4)
- Anne Priestley – Mary (Series 2)
- Edward de Souza – Sam Greenland (Series 2 and 3)

== Plot ==
Sarah France is the 42-year-old widow of a GP, Henry. She lives in an often volatile family situation with her elderly mother, Eleanor Prescott, and her daughter, eighteen-year-old Clare France, with both of whom she shares a house. After Henry's death, all three members of the family have to find a way to cope with each other as best they can.

Sarah often finds herself in the middle of things, usually figuratively, but always literally, given that she has her daughter living upstairs and her mother in the basement flat. (In the radio series, it was the mother who lived upstairs and the daughter downstairs.) Eleanor is ruthlessly cunning and takes every opportunity to get one over on Sarah. Anything told to Eleanor will spread by word of mouth throughout an extensive network of the elderly of the area, or the "geriatric mafia" or "geriatric KGB". Clare is trying to be independent of her mother, though often has to come running back in times of crisis.

The relationships between the three women change constantly through each episode. Sometimes mother and daughter ally against grandmother, sometimes mother and grandmother go against daughter, but usually grandmother and granddaughter gang up on the long-suffering Sarah, whose one haven is Bygone Books, the remarkably unsuccessful second-hand bookshop where she works for Russell, who dispenses in turn sympathy and wisdom. Most of the time, Russell sees the women's relationships second-hand through Sarah, although he isn't opposed to taking the occasional more active role when necessary. In turn, Sarah can see some of Russell's difficulties of living with a gay partner in a small 1980s Home Counties town while at the same time seeing Russell's relationship as the one perfect marriage she knows.

== Production ==
The adaptation for television allowed more to be seen of some of the more minor characters in the radio series, with appearances by some who had appeared only by reputation on the radio. These included Eleanor's best friend and rival Vera Poling, and Valerie Brown on the pension counter's sister Mary. In the television adaptation, Sarah also gained an on-off partner in Sam Greenland.

Many of the exterior locations for the television series were shot in the village of Thames Ditton in Surrey and Twickenham.

The property used for the France house exterior is on St George's Road in Twickenham near Twickenham Bridge and was owned at the time by the family of television presenter Sophie Raworth. The gardens have occasionally been open to the public as part of the National Garden Scheme

== Episodes ==
Series	Episode	Title	First broadcast
1	1	The Older Man	4 January 1988
1	2	Phone Calls	11 January 1988
1	3	The Teapot	18 January 1988
1	4	Security	25 January 1988
1	5	Romantic Complications	1 February 1988
1	6	The Birthday	8 February 1988
Special	1	A Quiet Christmas	26 December 1988
2	1	Intellectual Aspirations	10 January 1989
2	2	Open Secrets	17 January 1989
2	3	Memory Games	24 January 1989
2	4	The Cold	31 January 1989
2	5	Wedding Bells	7 February 1989
2	6	Lines Of Communication (a.k.a. Crossed Wires)	28 February 1989
2	7	Gossip	7 March 1989
2	8	Out On A Limb	14 March 1989
2	9	Upstagers	21 March 1989
2	10	Idle Speculation	28 March 1989
2	11	Efficiency	4 April 1989
2	12	Going Away (a.k.a. Situations Vacant)	11 April 1989
Special	2	A Week Of Sundays	25 December 1989
3	1	Mr Right	23 January 1990
3	2	Curiosity	30 January 1990
3	3	Home Comforts	6 February 1990
3	4	Relative Movement	13 February 1990
3	5	The Dinner Party (a.k.a. The Party)	20 February 1990
3	6	Mr Fixit	27 February 1990
3	7	Charity	6 March 1990
3	8	The Mysterious Affair At Bygone Books	13 March 1990
3	9	Party Politics	20 March 1990
3	10	Unforeseen Circumstances (a.k.a. Out of the Blue)	27 March 1990
3	11	Family Album	3 April 1990
3	12	Last Chances (a.k.a. Final Chance)	10 April 1990
4	1	Dependent Relatives	20 July 1992
4	2	Poor Relations	27 July 1992
4	3	A Fully Extended Family	3 August 1992
4	4	Yes And No	10 August 1992
4	5	The Married Man	17 August 1992
4	6	The Other Married Man	24 August 1992

== DVD releases ==
All four series including a 6-disc set of the complete series have been released on DVD in the UK (Region 2).

The ‘Complete series’ was originally released by Network as a 6 DVD set, but when Network went bankrupt the rights were bought by ‘Old Gold Media’ who re-released the Network set in 2024 with the Network branding removed. They also corrected the Network release which states on the cover ‘contains all 30 episodes’ when the series actually consisted of 38 episodes. Both sets have the same running-time so the error only seems to have been on the cover of the Network set.

DVD	Release date
The Complete Series 1	10 March 2008
The Complete Series 2	28 January 2009
The Complete Series 3	20 April 2009
The Complete Series 4	22 June 2009
The Complete Series 1 to 4 Box Set	2 November 2009
The Complete Series - Box Set	1 July 2024

== Stage version ==
Encouraged by the success of the transfer from radio to television, in 1991 Simon Brett began writing a stage play version, with intention of both Scales and Sanderson continuing to play their roles, and the option of different actresses to portray Clare. The production was planned as a three hander comedy-of-errors across the generation gaps, but the idea was dropped following the death of Sanderson in 1992, with Brett feeling that the part could not be replicated by anyone else.

== Other versions ==
A Dutch version of the series, Zonder Ernst (translating as "without Ernst"), was made by NCRV.
