= Santa Esmeralda =

French-American disco group

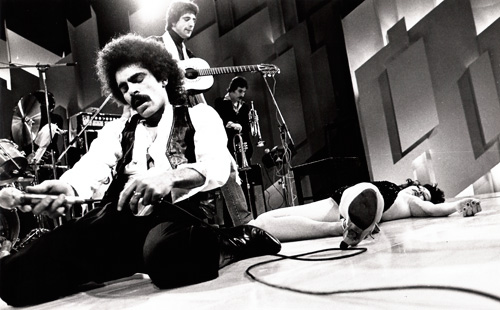
- Jimmy Goings and Santa Esmeralda performing on stage in Viña Del Mar, Chile in 1979.

Background information
- Origin: France / United States
- Genres: Disco, Latin pop
- Years active: 1977–1983; 2002–present
- Labels: Philips, Fauves Puma, Casablanca, Hot Productions, Pazzazz
- Past members: Leroy Gómez (lead vocals 1977–78); Jimmy Goings (lead vocals 1978–83); Jean Claude Petit (keyboards, arrangement, composer); José Souc (Spanish guitar, arrangement); Slim Pezin (electric guitar, arrangement); Christian Padovan (bass)

Santa Esmeralda is a French-American disco group formed in the 1970s. The group had hits with its covers of the 1960s hits "Don't Let Me Be Misunderstood" and "House of the Rising Sun". Santa Esmeralda featured original lead singer Leroy Gómez in 1977–1978 and singer Jimmy Goings from late 1978 until 1983.

== History ==
The band was formed in 1977 by French producers Nicolas Skorsky and Jean Manuel de Scarano, singer-songwriters who launched a label with the aim of producing artists who would record their compositions. Upon meeting singer Leroy Gómez in Paris, the duo recruited him for the group's first record, "Don't Let Me Be Misunderstood", which debuted on the independent French label, Fauves Puma. A sudden success in Europe, the record was picked up for worldwide distribution by Casablanca Records.

=== "Don't Let Me Be Misunderstood" ===
The song was originally written in 1964 for Nina Simone, but her version had failed to chart, and the song was picked up by British rock band the Animals the following year, to great success. Santa Esmeralda recast the song into the disco style of the era, and added Latin and flamenco elements. The song became a hit, first topping the U.S. disco chart and then matching the #15 peak of the Animals' version on the Billboard Hot 100. The album was certified gold. The flip side of the record featured the love ballad "You're My Everything" which was a popular request song on radio, where it received substantial airplay, even though it never charted. Despite the success of the record, Gomez did not record any subsequent records with Santa Esmeralda's original production team.

=== "The House of the Rising Sun" ===
After the band's first album, singer Jimmy Goings was brought in to replace Leroy Gomez. In late 1977, Santa Esmeralda scored a top 20 disco hit with a dance version of another song made famous by the Animals, "The House of the Rising Sun". In 1978, they recorded the song "Sevilla Nights" for the Thank God It's Friday soundtrack. In addition to their contribution to that hit soundtrack, their album The House of the Rising Sun also appeared on the Pop and Black charts that year. Following the success of their first two albums, they had a minor club hit with their 1978 album Beauty, and returned to the Disco top 20 with "Another Cha-Cha/Cha-Cha Suite", which peaked at #16 in 1979. The album featured extensive writing from Goings which would continue for the rest of the band's existence. In 1980, the group released Don't Be Shy Tonight as internal conflict started to form between the producers of the group, this time scoring a hit with "C'est Magnifique". In 1981, Skorsky produced Hush and 1982's Green Talisman. Don't Be Shy Tonight, Hush and Green Talisman marked the band's foray into experimentation with a wider variety of sounds including reggae.

=== Tours around the world ===
Santa Esmeralda also toured extensively throughout the world. During this time, the live band included musicians Tony Baker (guitar), Mick Valentino (guitar), Charlie Magarian (bass), Jimmy Sanchez (drums), Tom Poole (trumpet) and Reggie Graham (keyboards).

In 2011, footage of the band's performance at the Viña del Mar International Song Festival, Chile, in 1979 was released on DVD by the European company Soul Collectors.

Santa Esmeralda (starring Leroy Gómez) is still touring throughout the world (EEG – Europolis Entertainment Group).

=== Later recordings ===
In 2002, Gómez, who had been touring with a new incarnation of the group, released Lay Down My Love, an album of new material, and in 2004 Santa Esmeralda – The Greatest Hits, featuring newly recorded versions of the band's disco-era hits, including those which had been sung by Goings. Essentially unaffiliated with the original producers and musicians aside from Gómez, the new releases feature a much more synthesized sound than previous recordings. The group re-entered the popular consciousness in 2003 when "Don't Let Me Be Misunderstood" appeared on the soundtrack to the first volume of Quentin Tarantino's Kill Bill: Volume 1.
