= Daniel Guichard =

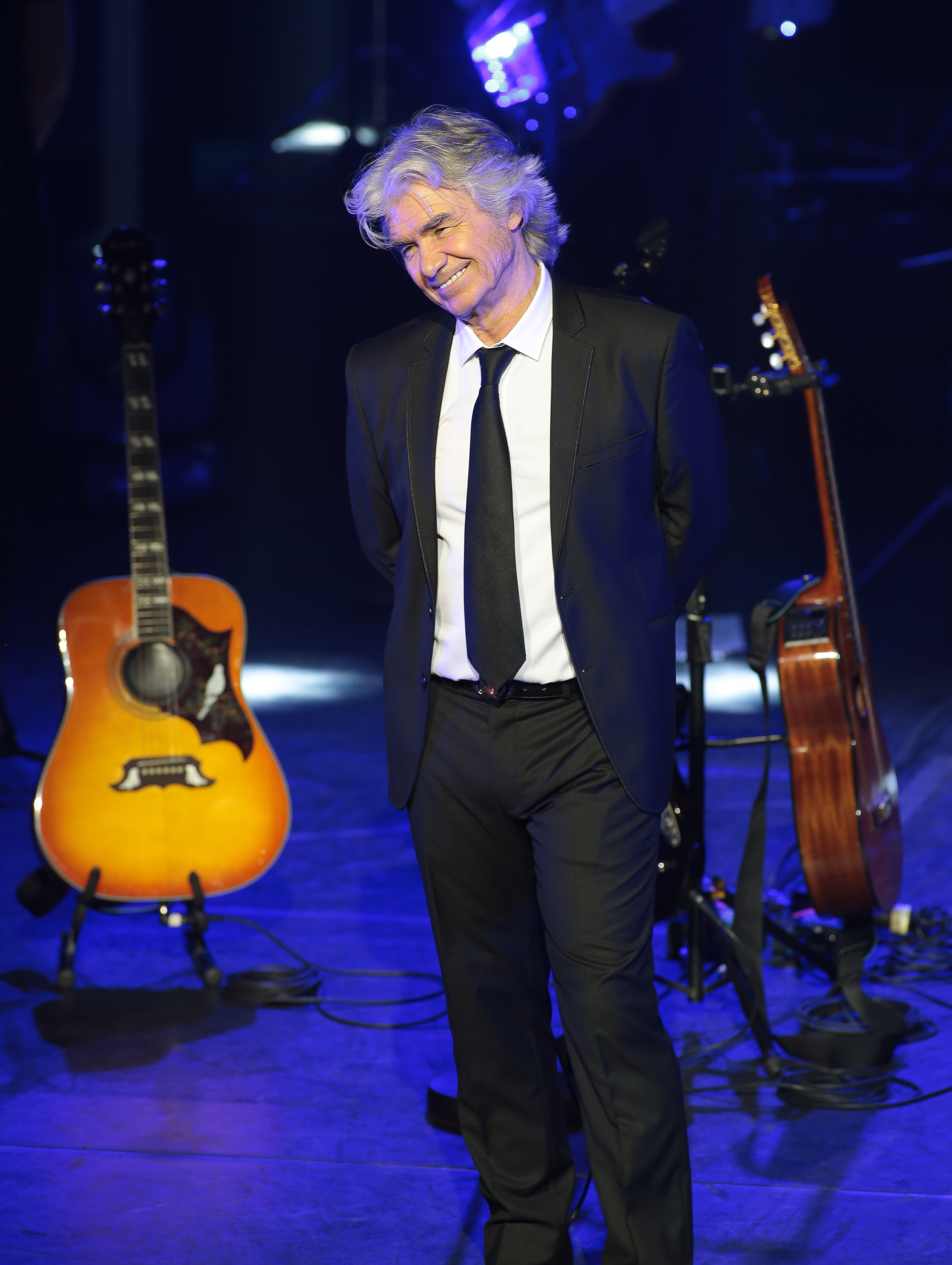
- Daniel Guichard

Background information
- Born: 21 November 1948 (age 76); Paris, France
- Genres: French pop music
- Occupation(s): Singer, songwriter
- Years active: 1968–present
- Website: www.daniel-guichard.com

Daniel Guichard (French pronunciation: [danjɛl ɡiʃaʁ]; born 21 November 1948) is a French singer, songwriter and record producer.

== Life and career ==
He was born in Paris, of mixed Breton and eastern European heritage, and grew up in the Les Halles area. His father died when he was in his teens, and he worked in local markets and warehouses. In the evenings, he performed the songs of Aristide Bruant, Edith Piaf and others in clubs in Montmartre and Saint-Germain-des-Prés. After initially recording for Decca, he started working as a packer at Barclay Records, releasing his first record for the label, "Où C’est Qu’il Est Barré Gavroche?", in 1969. He had his first big hit in France in 1972 with "La Tendresse", a song originally written by Patricia Carli for Mireille Mathieu, and made his first appearance at the Olympia that year, supporting Matthieu. Establishing himself in the early 1970s as a popular performer of chansons and ballads, he had his biggest success in 1974 with "Mon Vieux", a song composed ten years earlier by Jean Ferrat with lyrics originally by Michèle Senlis but modified by Guichard. He continued to have success in France through the 1970s and 1980s, with a sequence of hits including "Je viens pas te parler d’amour", "Chanson pour Anna" (dedicated to Anne Frank), and "Le Gitan".

In 1975 he established his own record label, Kuklos, recording a wide range of artists. In 1982, Guichard set up an unlicensed radio station, Radio Bocal, broadcasting from his home. He also organized a series of concerts to raise funds for cancer research, involving such musicians as Michel Delpech, Salvatore Adamo and Richard Cocciante. He continued to record, but his style became increasingly unfashionable and he became increasingly disenchanted with the entertainment industry. In the early 1990s he cut his formal ties with the industry in Paris and moved to the south of France with his family. He toured the country regularly in his motor home to perform in concerts and at music festivals, and attracted criticism on one occasion for appearing at a show in support of the Front National.

He has continued to perform and record in France.
