= Standing Up for Love =

Studio album by the Three Degrees
- Released: February 1977
- Genres: Soul; disco
- Label: Epic
- Producers: Richard Barrett, Richie Rome, Brad Shapiro

The Three Degrees chronology
A Toast of Love (1976)	Standing Up for Love (1977)	New Dimensions (1978)

Singles from Standing Up for Love
- 1. "Standing Up for Love" Released: Late 1976

Professional ratings
Review scores
Source	Rating
AllMusic	3/5 stars
The Encyclopedia of Popular Music	2/5 stars

Standing Up for Love is a 1977 studio album released by the American female vocal group the Three Degrees. Having enjoyed a successful three year streak with Philadelphia International Records (PIR), the group signed a one-album contract with Epic Records (a subsidiary of CBS Records) in late 1976. The resulting album coincided with the departure of founding group member Fayette Pinkney, and the return of former member Helen Scott.

The album received its first issue onto CD, with an expanded edition in April 2012 by Funky Town Grooves USA.

== Track listing ==
Side A:

1. "Standing Up for Love" (George Clinton) - 5.15
2. "What I Did for Love" (from the musical A Chorus Line) (Ed Kleban, Marvin Hamlisch) - 3.41
3. "Just Leave Me Alone" (Robert Galbraith) - 5.41
4. "Macaroni Man" (Jimmy Jules) - 3.42
5. "Gee Baby (I'm Sorry)" (Richard Barrett) - 2.54

Side B:

1. "People with Feeling" (T. Rakes, Russ Faith) - 4.41
2. "In Love We Grow" (Dennis Belfield) - 3.57
3. "We're All Alone" (William Royce Scaggs) - 3.41
4. "Standing Up for Love (Reprise)" (George Clinton) - 2.29

== CD Track Listing Expanded Edition 2012 ==
1. "Standing Up for Love"
2. "What I Did for Love" (from the musical A Chorus Line)*
3. "Just Leave Me Alone"
4. "Macaroni Man"*
5. "Gee Baby (I'm Sorry)"*
6. "People with Feeling"
7. "In Love We Grow"
8. "We're All Alone"
9. "Standing Up for Love" (Reprise)

Bonus Tracks

1. "Toast of Love" - Single Version - Non Album*
2. "Do It (Use Your Mind)" - Single Version*
3. "Standing Up for Love" - Single Version

== Personnel ==
- Sheila Ferguson – vocals
- Valerie Holiday – vocals
- Helen Scott – vocals
- Fayette Pinkney – vocals*
- Barbara Ingram – vocals
