= Nicolas Skorsky =

French composer, lyricist, and music producer

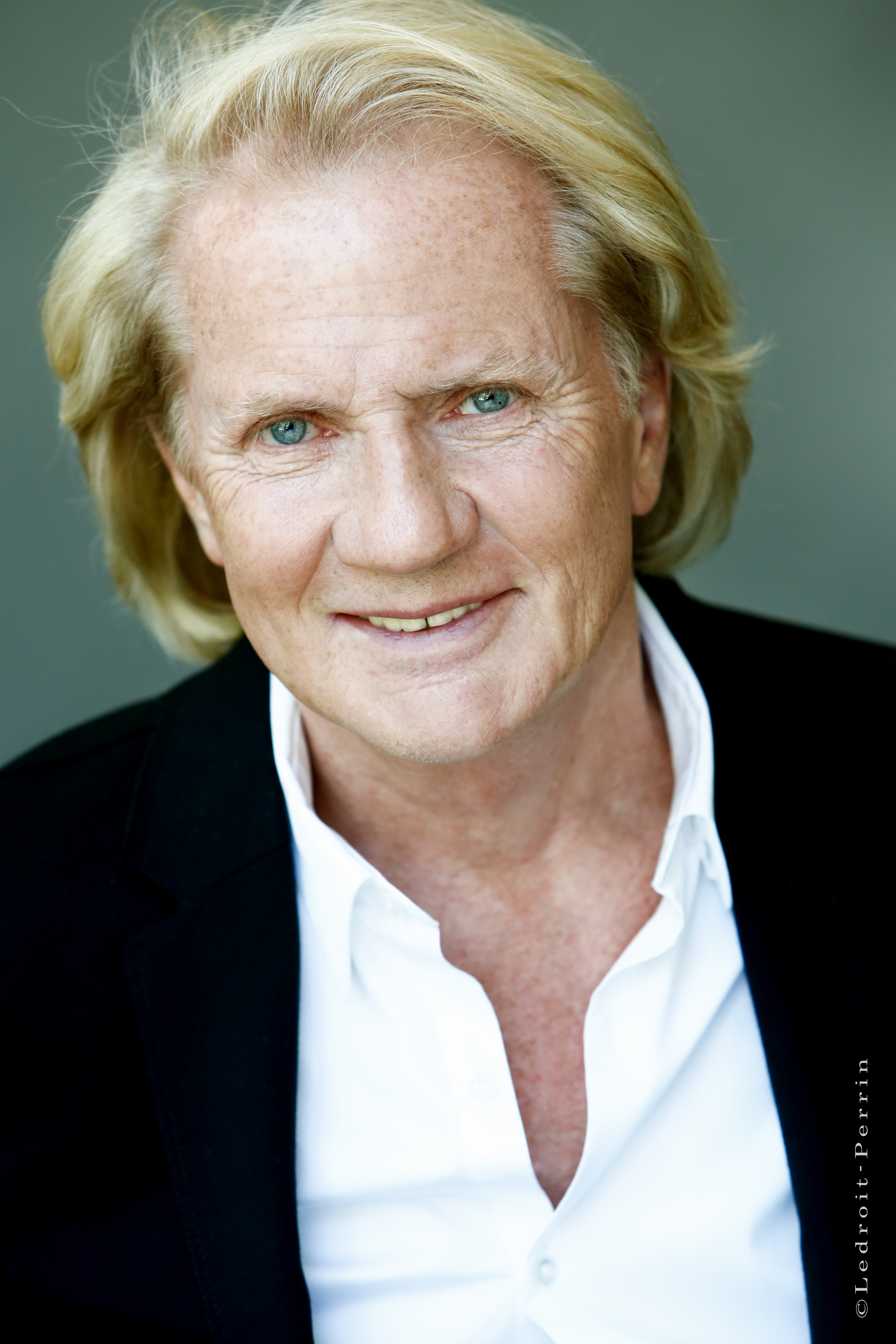

Background information
- Born: Jacques Robert Penel Skorsky; 16 May 1952; Paris, France
- Died: 20 October 2014 (aged 62) Paris, France
- Occupations: Composer, songwriter, musician
- Labels: Carrere Records, Philips Records

Jacques Robert Penel Skorsky, known as Nicolas Skorsky (16 May 1952 – 20 October 2014) was a French composer, lyricist, and music producer.

== Biography ==
Born in Paris, Nicolas Skorsky began studying music at the age of six. He pursued his secondary education at Masséna High School in Nice and then moved on to the regional conservatory where he learns solfeggio.

He took advantage of the events of May 1968 to return to Paris where Catherine Sauvage, known for singing Aragon or Léo Ferré, commissioned a song from him: it became Gare du Nord (1970) for which he wrote both the lyrics and the music while he was not yet eighteen.

With this calling card, he arrived at Carrère as a singer-songwriter of Comme je t'aime (1972).

He launched a career as a songwriter and composer, crafting commercially successful tunes like Une bague et un collier (for Ringo, 1972, at Carrère), Chanson populaire (for Claude François, 1973, at Flèche Productions), La Bonne Franquette (for Herbert Pagani, 1974 – EMI), Une chanson française (Claude François, 1975, Flèche), as well as Pour ne rien te cacher (Marie Laforêt, 1974, Polydor), and Finalement on s'habitue (for Daniel Guichard, 1973, Barclay).

Later on, Skorsky shifted his focus towards production, starting in 1974 with the album Crystal Grass – Crystal World (Polydor), which became one of the first French hits in the emerging disco genre in the United States. He then established his own company, Fauves-Puma, which produced La Vie en couleur (Polydor, 1976), performed by a one-man band, Rémy Bricka. Adding to his achievements, he received the grand composition prize from the Yamaha Music Foundation at the World Festival in Tokyo for Dans le ciel (Into the sky, 1976, Polydor Japan).

Afterward, he crossed paths with Donna Summer while working on the soundtrack for the film Thank God It's Friday, where he wrote the instrumental theme Sevilla Nights, which achieved platinum status in the United States (1978, Casablanca Records & Filmworks).

He produced Jean-Claude Petit's jazz-rock album, The Best of All Possible Worlds (WEA, 1980). In 1985, Skorsky once again composed a soundtrack for the film Douce France by François Chardeaux, a television series produced by FR3.

In 1990, his collaboration with Rozlyne Clarke led to the writing and production of a pop-dance album titled Gorgeous.

Nicolas Skorsky was found murdered, with his throat slit, at his residence in Paris on the morning of 20 October 2014. To this day, the investigation has not resolved this case. He was laid to rest at the Passy Cemetery.

== Discography ==
=== As a songwriter ===
- Gare du nord (1970), by Catherine Sauvage.
- La Bonne Franquette (1974), by Herbert Pagani.
- Disco Love (1975), by Les Frères ennemis.
- Cumba Cumba (1976), by The Monstars.
- Sevilla Nights (1978), by Santa Esmeralda.

For Claude François

- Chanson populaire (1973)
- Une chanson française (1975)

For Ringo

- Une bague et un collier (1972)
- L'amour et la loi (1976)

For Daniel Guichard

- Finalement on s'habitué (1973)

For Rémy Bricka

- La vie en couleur (1976)
- Marylène (1976)
- Ah! Quelle famille (1977)
- Elle dit bleu, elle dit rose (1977)
- Aujourd'hui plus qu'hier... Et bien moins que demain (1984)
- L'idiote (1984)
- Marcher sur l'eau (1999)
- L'art et la manière, excerpt from the documentary, composition contemporaine pour le designer Patrick Jouin on Arte (2011)
- Une flic insoumise, directed by Stéphane Krausz (2012)
- Notre histoire conjugale, with Éliette Abécassis (2013)

=== As a producer ===
- La vie en couleurs by Remy Bricka (1976)
- Santa Esmeralda (1977)
- The best off all possible worlds (1979)
- J'voulais, performed by Sully Sefil (Rap) (2001)
- Santa Esmeralda suite (2003)
