= Joan Sanderson =

English actress (1912–1992)

- Born: 24 November 1912; Bristol, England
- Died: 24 May 1992 (aged 79); Norwich, England
- Occupation: Actress
- Years active: 1939–1992
- Spouse: Gregory Scott (m. 1948)

Joan Sanderson (24 November 1912 – 24 May 1992) was an English actress. During a long career on stage and screen, her tall and commanding disposition led to her playing mostly dowagers, spinsters and matrons, as well as intense Shakespearean roles. Her television work included appearances in the comedy series Please Sir! (1968–72), Rising Damp (1978), Fawlty Towers, Ripping Yarns (both 1979), and Me and My Girl (1984–88).

== Early life ==
Born and educated in Bristol, Sanderson trained at RADA, having harboured an interest in the performing arts from a young age. She had teaching diplomas in elocution, where she lost her Bristolian accent.

== Career ==
=== Theatre ===
Sanderson appeared in repertory theatres, on the West End stage, and at the Stratford Memorial Theatre, where she made her début in 1939 playing Emilia in The Comedy of Errors, a phase in her career that culminated in 1953 when she played both Goneril to Michael Redgrave's King Lear, and Queen Margaret in Richard III.

During the Second World War, Sanderson gained experience in repertory and toured North Africa and Italy entertaining the troops. In 1948, she married fellow actor Gregory Scott (born: Alphaeus Moseley).

Sanderson achieved her apotheosis as Delia, Lady Rumpers, in Habeas Corpus by Alan Bennett (Lyric Theatre, 1973). She starred in numerous West End productions, including See How They Run and Anyone for Denis?.

=== TV and film ===
Sanderson played Doris Ewell in the television comedy series Please Sir! (1968–72) and Mrs Pugh-Critchley, in the series All Gas and Gaiters (1970–71), as well as a role in the short-lived sitcom Wild, Wild Women (1969). In 1978 she appeared in an episode of Rising Damp, and the following year she played Mrs Richards in the Fawlty Towers episode "Communication Problems". She also appeared in After Henry, which was broadcast on the radio (1985–88) and television (1988–92), in which she played Eleanor.

Sanderson's film roles were rare, but she appeared in the Hylda Baker film She Knows Y'Know (1962), Who Killed the Cat? (1966), the film version of Please Sir! (1971), The Great Muppet Caper (1981), playing John Cleese's wife, and Prick Up Your Ears (1987), the film based on the life of playwright Joe Orton.

== Personal life and death ==
Sanderson's husband was the actor Gregory Scott, who appeared alongside her in Please Sir! as the largely non-speaking teacher Mr Wyatt. She died following a long illness with bone cancer in Norwich on 24 May 1992, aged 79, and was buried in Burnham Norton churchyard. A memorial service was held for her two months later at St Paul's, Covent Garden. Her husband died in October 1992.

The final series of After Henry was broadcast in July and August 1992, following her death; the last episode was dedicated to Sanderson. Following Sanderson's death – a month before the premiere of her final series, Land of Hope and Gloria – the creators, despite originally intending to make a second series, opted not to go ahead with it.

== Credits ==
=== TV and film ===
Year	Title	Role
1951	Young Wives' Tale	Nurse
1954	Sunday Night Theatre	Mrs. Dangerfield
1955	St. Ives	Miss Gilchrist
1961	The Pocket Lancer	Countess of Clarencourt
1962	She Knows Y'Know	Euphemia Smallhope
1962	Dial RIX	Mrs. Hathaway
1963	Maigret	Juliette Boynet
1964	Detective - End of Chapter	Mrs. Blayne
1965	The Wednesday Play: The Confidence Course	Angela Walker
1965	Night Train To Surbiton	Manageress
1966	Seven Deadly Sins	Hotel Receptionist
1966	Who Killed the Cat?	Mrs. Sandford
1967	Boy Meets Girl	Germaine
1967	The Wednesday Play: Fall of the Goat	Isobel
1969	Wild, Wild Women	Mrs. Harcourt
1970	The Human Element	Lady Brancaster
1970–1971	All Gas and Gaiters	Mrs. Grace Pugh-Critchley
1971	Please Sir!	Miss Doris Ewell
1975	The Les Dawson Show	various
1975	Crown Court	Susan Halls
1975	Upstairs, Downstairs: "Noblesse Oblige"	Mrs. Waddilove
1976	Yus, My Dear	Mrs. Hartington
1976	Well Anyway	The Countess
1976	Wodehouse Playhouse: Strychnine in the Soup	Lady Bassett
1977	Jubilee: Silver Lining	Unknown
1978	The Ghosts of Motley Hall	Alexandra
1978	Rising Damp "Pink Carnations"	Mother
1978	Mixed Blessings	Aunt Dorothy
1978	Doris and Doreen	Dorothy Binns
1979	Fawlty Towers: "Communication Problems"	Mrs. Richards
1979	Ripping Yarns "Roger of the Raj"	Lady Bartlesham
1980	How's Your Father?	Unknown
1981	The Great Muppet Caper	Dorcas
1981	Barriers	Miss Morton
1981	Janet and Company	Unknown
1982	Play for Today: Intensive Care	Miss Tunstall
1982	Anyone for Denis?	Rear Admiral
1983	All for Love	Mrs. Davidson
1983	Agatha Christie's Partners in Crime The House of Lurking Death	Rachel Logan
1984	The Fainthearted Feminist	Mother
1984–1988	Me and My Girl	Nell Cresset
1985	Alice in Wonderland	The Queen of Hearts (voice)
1986	Full House	Mrs. Hatfield
1987	Prick Up Your Ears	John Lahr's mother-in-law
1987	East of Ipswich	Miss Wilbraham
1988	Thompson	Unknown
1988–1992	After Henry	Eleanor Prescott
1989	Alexei Sayle's Stuff "Tinkering With Teeth"	Wilma Gatling
1992	Land of Hope and Gloria	Nanny Princeton

=== Radio ===
Year	Title	Role
1954	Personal Call	Mrs. Lamb
1962–1977	The Men from the Ministry	Various
1971–1972	All Gas and Gaiters	Mrs. Grace Pugh-Critchley
1973–1981	What Ho! Jeeves	Aunt Agatha
1976–1979	Jim the Great	Queen Esmeralda
1985–1989	After Henry	Eleanor Prescott
