= Janine Wood =

English actress

Janine Wood is an English actress, born on 30 December 1963. She played Clare France in the Thames TV sitcom After Henry, the role previously played in the original radio series by Gerry Cowper. She is mother to William Miller, actor and ex-footballer, who played Oliver Twist in the 2007 miniseries adaptation. In 2021, she appeared in the ITV crime drama Innocent.

== Film & Television ==
Year	Title	Role	Notes
1988-1992	After Henry	Clare France	38 episodes
1992	Emily Brontë's Wuthering Heights	Frances Earnshaw	Film
2021	Innocent	Detective Constable Mia Hollins	Series 2, 4 episodes
