= Rémy Bricka =

French musician

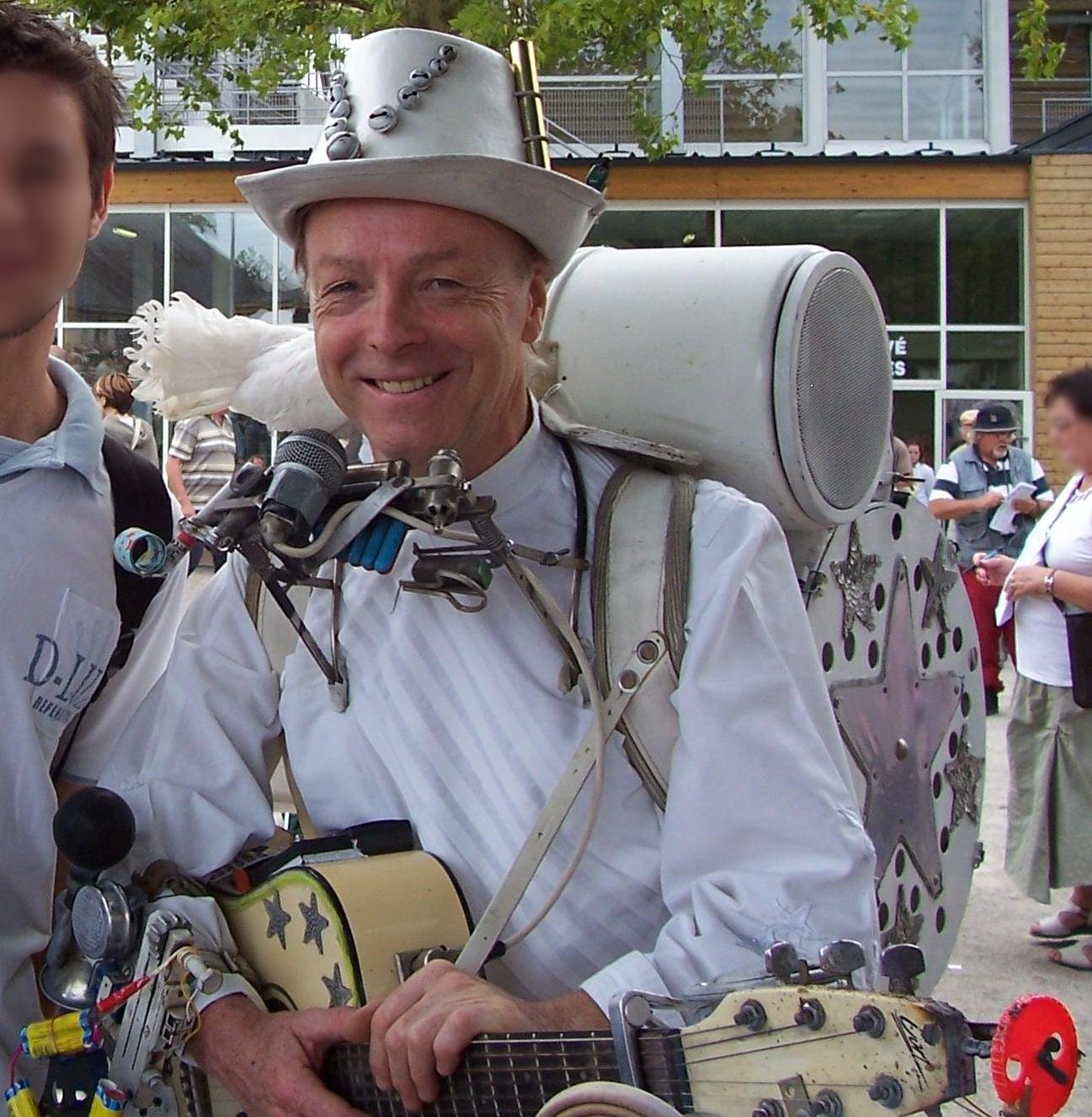
Rémy Bricka in 2006

Rémy Bricka (born April 10, 1949 in Niederbronn-les-Bains, Bas-Rhin) is a French musician, one-man band, and singer. He became the first person to walk across the Atlantic Ocean, in 1988, using floating skis to walk on water.

His most successful album is La Vie en couleur, and in 1977 that song of his became a number five hit in France. The single Elle dit bleu elle dit rose sold 250,000 copies.

Along with the French versions, he released German versions of Petite fille du roi (Lakritz und Pfefferminz) and Chanter la vie (Freunde zu haben). In May 2008, Bricka appeared with Julien Doré in his single Les limites.

== Aquatic pedestrianism ==
Between April 2 and May 31, 1988 he crossed the Atlantic on floating skis, propelled by a pair of oars. He attempted to cross the Pacific (between Los Angeles and Sydney) by the same method. He started out on April 24, 2000, but failed, and he was recovered south of Hawaii on September 25 after five months of travel. A book was published in 1990 on his earlier adventure: L’Homme qui marche sur l’eau (The Man who Walks on Water).

== Discography ==
=== Singles ===
- Tagada
- 1972: Pour un dollar pour un penny (written by Serge Prisset and Jim Larriaga)
- 1974: Le Pantin
- 1976: La Vie en couleur (written by Guy Floriant and Nicolas Skorsky)
- 1977: Ah ! Quelle famille (Floriant and Skorsky)
- 1977: Elle dit bleu, elle dit rose (Floriant and Skorsky)
- 1977: Petite fille du roi (written by Rémy Bricka)
- 1977: Ta Maison dans les fleurs
- 1978: Chantons Noël
- 1979: Le Bon Dieu m'a dit
- 1979: Ok ! Pour un chien !
- 1985: Chanter la vie (written by Philippe David and Lisa-Sylvie Bellec)
- 1999: Marcher sur l'eau (written by Philippe Laumont and Skorsky)

=== Albums ===
==== La Vie en couleur ====
- La Vie en couleur
- Pas de problème
- Marcher sur l'eau
- Ta Maison dans les fleurs
- Le Bonheur n'est jamais loin
- Marylène
- Ma Petite Sirène
- Le Temps passe si vite
- Elle dit bleu, elle dit rose
- Libera
- Ah ! Quelle famille

"Libera" and "marcher sur l'eau" were not part of the original 1978 release. They replaced Si aujourd'hui tu m'abandonnes and Chanson pour un bagarre on the 2000 or 2002 reissue.

==== Marcher sur l'eau ====
Released on October 30, 2000

- Marcher sur l'eau
- Pas de problème
- La Vie en couleur
- Ta Maison dans les fleurs
- Ma Petite Sirène
- Marylène
- Le Bonheur n'est jamais loin
- Le Temps passe si vite
- Elle dit bleu, elle dit rose
- Libera
- Ah ! Quelle famille
- Marcher sur l'eau (instrumental)
