= Jonathan Newth =

English actor (born 1939

- Born: Jonathan G. Newth; 6 March 1939 (age 87); Edmonton, London, England
- Education: Central School of Speech and Drama
- Occupation: Actor
- Spouse(s): Joanna Brookes (m. 1963, divorced) (2 children) Gay Wilde (m. 1979) (4 children)
- Children: 6

Jonathan Newth (born 6 March 1939) is a British actor who has appeared extensively in British television drama for over 50 years.

== Early life ==
Brought up in Hadleigh, Newth worked on a farm (his father being a fruit farmer) for a while after leaving school. He worked as a student assistant stage manager at a theatre in Suffolk before training at the Central School of Speech and Drama. After doing two years national service as a Royal Marines Commando, he made his debut in Ipswich.

== Career ==
Newth's theatre work includes appearances with the RSC, in the West End and on Broadway.

Newth's television credits include Emergency Ward 10, The Six Wives of Henry VIII, Ace of Wands, The Troubleshooters, Z-Cars, Callan, Van der Valk, The Brothers, Softly, Softly, Poldark, Doctor Who (Underworld), Notorious Woman, Secret Army (Barsacq), The Professionals, The Nightmare Man, The Day of the Triffids, Tenko (Colonel Clifford Jefferson), Triangle, Angels, Juliet Bravo, After Henry, The Return of Sherlock Holmes ("The Bruce-Partington Plans"), Boon, Bugs, The Bill, Agatha Christie's Poirot (Dumb Witness), Peak Practice, Heartbeat and Doctors.

== Personal life ==
While at the Royal Central School of Drama, Newth met the actress Joanna Brookes. They married on 11 September 1963, later having two children. He later married another actress, Gay Wilde in 1979 and they have lived in Bradford-on-Avon with their four children since 1989.

He suffers from tinnitus and is also partially deaf, becoming aware of this around the late 1980s. He believes it may have been caused by being close to a loud explosion during his national service, which could have had a delayed reaction.

== Partial filmography ==
- Carry On Spying (1964) - Guard (uncredited)
- Far from the Madding Crowd (1967) - Gentleman at Cockfight
- Yellow Dog (1973) - Tim
- Danger on Dartmoor (1980) - Mr. Chudleigh
- North Sea Hijack (1980) - Kirk
- Champions (1984) - Mr. Griffith Jones
- The Case of Marcel Duchamp (1984) - Darriand
- Incognito (1997) - Judge
- The Affair of the Necklace (2001) - Magistrate de Marce
