= The Three Degrees =

American female vocal group

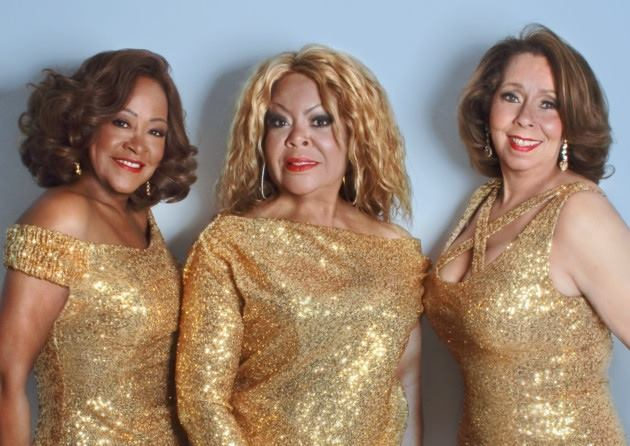
- The Three Degrees: Valerie Holiday, Freddi Poole and Helen Scott (left to right, c. 2016)

Background information
- Origin: Philadelphia, Pennsylvania, U.S.
- Genres: R&B; Philadelphia soul; disco
- Works: The Three Degrees discography
- Years active: c. 1963–present
- Labels: Philadelphia International; Epic; Ariola; Swan Records; Roulette Records; 3D Records; Ichiban Records; Neptune Records; Metromedia; Warner Brothers
- Members: Hazel Payne: Valerie Holiday; Freddi Poole; Helen Scott; Skyler Jordan; Tamika Peoples
- Past members: Fayette Pinkney; Linda Turner; Shirley Porter; Janet Harmon; Sheila Ferguson; Sundray Tucker; Sonia Goring; Miquel Brown; Vera Brown; Rhea Harris; Victoria Wallace; Cynthia Garrison; Tabitha King; Jessie Wagner
- Website: thethreedegrees.com the3degrees.com

The Three Degrees is an American female vocal group formed circa 1963 in Philadelphia, Pennsylvania. Although several women have been members over the years, the group has always been a trio. The group were particularly successful in the UK, achieving 13 Top 50 hit singles between 1974 and 1985.

The current line-up consists of Valerie Holiday, Freddi Poole, and Hazel Payne, formerly of A Taste of Honey.

A second grouping features Three Degree Helen Scott, with Skyler Jordan and Tamika Peoples.

The original members were Fayette Pinkney, Shirley Porter and Linda Turner. By mid-1963, Porter and Turner were replaced by Janet Harmon and Helen Scott; Scott was replaced by Sheila Ferguson in 1966, while Harmon was replaced by Valerie Holiday in 1967. This line-up of Pinkney, Holiday and Ferguson became the most successful in the group's history; together from 1967 to 1976, they topped the Billboard US Hot 100 as featured vocalists on the MFSB single "TSOP (The Sound of Philadelphia)" in 1974, and had seven UK Top 40 hits, including the 1974 single "When Will I See You Again", which was a huge international hit, reaching the Top 5 in seven countries, including number two in the US and topping the UK Singles Chart. When Pinkney left the group in 1976, she was replaced by a returning Helen Scott. This line-up had four UK Top 20 hits, including "Woman in Love", which reached number three in 1979. Ferguson left for a solo career in 1986.

The group's most stable line-up was from 1989 to 2010, with Cynthia Garrison joining Holiday and Scott. They achieved a final UK chart entry, reaching number 54 in 1998 with a dance cover of "Last Christmas". Garrison left the band at the end of 2010 for health reasons, and was replaced by Freddi Poole in 2011. The group's 2016 album, Strategy: Our Tribute to Philadelphia, was their first studio album release with Poole as a member.

== Career ==
=== 1960s ===
The Three Degrees were formed around 1963 in Philadelphia according to founder member, the late Fayette Pinkney: "it's about '63, last year in high school...and it was fun!". They were discovered by producer and songwriter Richard Barrett, who produced the original line-up on their first song, "Gee Baby (I'm Sorry)", for Swan Records, in 1965. Turner and Porter both left the group, leaving Fayette Pinkney the only original member. They were eventually replaced by Helen Scott and Janet Harmon Barrett also became manager of Sheila Ferguson, who had been friends with Scott since high school. Barrett signed Ferguson to Swan Records in 1965. The Three Degrees released a number of singles, including "I'm Gonna Need You" and a cover version of "Maybe" in 1966. Fayette, Janet and Helen were often joined by Sheila on their Swan recordings and the Group often backed Sheila on her solo records during that time.

When Scott left the group in 1966 to start a family, Ferguson filled in for her. She remained for 20 years and was lead singer on most of the group's best-selling tracks. Harmon left by 1967 and, after brief stints by Sundray Tucker and Sonia Goring, she was replaced by Valerie Holiday that same year. Barrett signed the trio to recording contracts over the next three years with Warner Bros., Metromedia, and Neptune record labels, the latter owned by Kenny Gamble and Leon Huff, who would work with the group five years later. At this point, the group's close harmony singing made them a popular nightclub act, but a hit record still eluded them.

=== 1970s ===
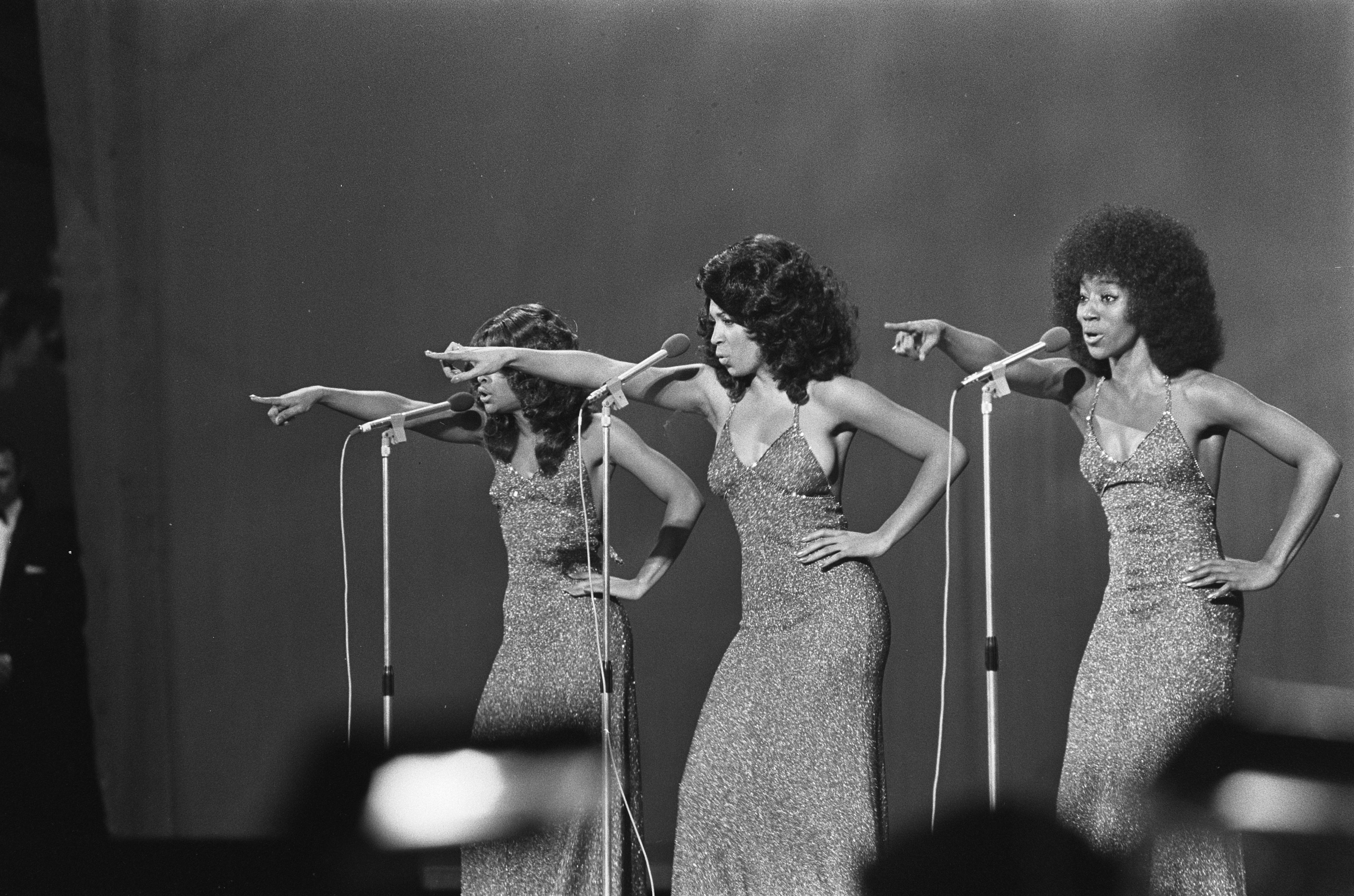
The Three Degrees onstage in 1974

By 1970, they were signed to Roulette Records and they released their first album, Maybe. The title song, this time with Valerie Holiday taking the lead, took them to No. 4 on the US R&B chart. The singles, "I Do Take You" and "You're the Fool" followed, as did their second album, So Much Love. This success landed them a cameo appearance in the 1971 film, The French Connection, where they performed a cover of Jimmy Webb's "Everybody Gets to Go to the Moon", filmed during one of their appearances at the Copacabana nightclub in New York City.

In 1973, when their contract with Roulette ended, Barrett signed them to Philadelphia International Records under Kenny Gamble and Leon Huff, where they had their greatest successes. The first song they recorded for the label was with the studio band MFSB, titled "TSOP (The Sound of Philadelphia)", which was the theme song for Soul Train. In October 1973, the group also made an appearance on the American television sitcom Sanford and Son (season 3, episode 4), singing their song "I Didn't Know".

Their first album for the Philadelphia International label, The Three Degrees, spawned three hits: "Dirty Ol' Man" (which went gold in the Netherlands and Belgium), "Year Of Decision" (which made it to No. 13 in the UK Singles Chart), but it was the third single, "When Will I See You Again", that propelled the trio into the mainstream. It topped the UK Chart for two weeks in August 1974 (the first time this had been achieved by an all-female group since The Supremes in 1964,) and became the fourth best-selling single of the year. It also reached No. 2 in the US, where it sold over two million copies and earned the trio a gold record in December 1974 (at that time, Platinum certifications had not been assigned to singles).

The Three Degrees also recorded two live albums: one in Leicester in the UK, and the other in Tokyo in Japan, and released both in 1975. The trio's second studio album for the Philadelphia label, The Three Degrees International, was marketed internationally under different titles and in various languages. In Continental Europe, it was called With Love, and it spawned the hit single "Take Good Care Of Yourself", which reached the UK Top 10. The UK release of the album was actually titled Take Good Care Of Yourself and peaked at No. 6 in the UK Albums Chart, their highest ever chart placing for an album there. Two other songs from the album were big successes in Japan: "Midnight Train" and "Nigai Namida", the latter having been recorded in Japanese.

In 1976, the Three Degrees parted company with Gamble and Huff and moved to CBS Sony/Epic Records where they released the concept album, A Toast Of Love, purely for the Far East market, although a single of the title track was released internationally. In 1976, Fayette Pinkney was replaced by former band member Helen Scott. The album, Standing Up For Love, released in 1977 was their last release for CBS/Epic.

In 1978, The Three Degrees signed to Ariola Records in Europe and the US and began working with Giorgio Moroder, who had become famous as a disco producer following his work with Donna Summer. Further success was to follow, and they released two disco-styled albums on Ariola (New Dimensions in 1978, and 3D in 1979) which delivered four UK Top 20 hits between them: "Givin' Up Givin' In", "Woman in Love", "The Runner" and "My Simple Heart".

The group performed for future British monarch Charles III at his 30th birthday party in 1978, and were guests at the pre-wedding party for his marriage to Lady Diana Spencer in 1981; whilst he was the Prince of Wales. His Majesty is arguably the most famous fan of the band and their 1978 hit, "Givin' Up, Givin' In", is said to be his favourite song. Their own television special, The Three Degrees at The Royal Albert Hall (aka An Evening with The Three Degrees), was recorded in October 1979 in which the trio were backed by the Royal Philharmonic Orchestra.

=== 1980s ===
In 1980, the compilation album Gold was released and became a UK Top 10 hit. Featuring one side of their hits on the Ariola label between 1978 and 1979, and one side of live recordings from their 1979 Royal Albert Hall television special, this would be the trio's second "best of" compilation to make the UK Top 10 in less than two years, after CBS released A Collection of their 20 Greatest Hits in early 1979 (which featured their pre-Ariola material, and peaked at number 8 in the UK Albums Chart).

Between 1982 and 1985, The Three Degrees released two albums on their own 3D label; Album of Love and Live in the UK. On that label they also released "Liar", a single written by Sheila Ferguson. A third BBC Television show was also recorded in 1982, titled Take 3 Degrees, which included performances of their greatest hits, and also songs that the group were performing in their latest show, such as "I Can't Turn You Loose" and "Celebration".

They returned to the UK charts in 1985 with "The Heaven I Need" which was produced by Stock/Aitken/Waterman on Supreme Records, though the single narrowly missed the UK Top 40. The band expressed surprise the song did not chart higher, and spoke of their regret that their working relationship with the production team did not continue.

In 1986, Miquel Brown filled in for Scott while the latter was pregnant. That same year Ferguson decided to leave the group to focus on her family life and raising her daughters. Scott and Holiday replaced Ferguson with Vera Brown of The Ritchie Family in 1986, and then Rhea Harris in 1987. In 1989, Scott and Holiday, along with new recruit Victoria Wallace, recorded the album Three Degrees ... And Holding on Ichiban Records. A single, "A Tender Lie" was also released. Following the album, the group recorded a live CD at London's Dominion Theatre, with Billy Paul and Harold Melvin & the Bluenotes in 1989. The group followed this with another tour of the UK and Japan at the end of the year.

In a 2006 documentary interview, which featured Ferguson and Holiday speaking about their time together in the group, it was revealed that when Ferguson decided to leave the group, she spoke to the group members on a phone call about her decision instead of in person and both parties felt that the conversation ended abruptly. In addition, Holiday commented feeling upset that this specific conversation should have been in person and not on a phone call and said that it had been difficult to find a replacement for Ferguson. Since then, Ferguson has had limited contact with the members of the group and has never had any public appearances with The Three Degrees. In a 2011 interview on the British TV show, Lorraine, with The Three Degrees, they commented they may from time to time run into Ferguson in the United States. Often their encounters with Ferguson are only for brief moments; as Helen Scott had mentioned – it is like ships that pass in the night.

In 2019, Sheila Ferguson appeared on an interview with Jeremy Vine on his daytime TV show simply called Jeremy Vine where she expressed about how she felt so sorry about leaving The Three Degrees where they were like family, but was not sorry for raising her daughters despite the guilt that was bothering her for all these years. There was a short video clip shown in the interview showing her going for an exercise therapy session where she begins crying out loud saying, "I miss you" referring to missing The Three Degrees. She mentioned that because of the long period of time being with them for 20 years from the 1960s-80s, it was comparatively like a family and marriage that she just suddenly had to give up creating emotional heartbreaks.

=== 1990s–present ===
In December 1989, Cynthia Garrison replaced Victoria Wallace forming the longest running line-up of the group. In 1993, they were asked to record a new version of "When Will I See You Again" with Thomas Anders (of Modern Talking). He supplied three tracks for their album Out of the Past Into the Future, marking their return to Ariola Records and their most successful album for 15 years, Two further singles were released from the album, the re-recording of "Dirty Ol' Man" and new song "Hurry Hurry". In 1993 they released a new best of album, Best & New Hits: When Will I See You Again, which included 5 re-recorded hits and 5 cover songs. A seasonal album, Christmas With The Three Degrees, was also recorded in 1998. This album included a cover of Wham!'s "Last Christmas", which was released as a remixed dance single which gave the group their 15th (and final) UK top 60 single, reaching number 54.

Scott, Holiday and Garrison continued to tour. They made their first US TV appearance in over 20 years in 2003 on the PBS show, Rhythm, Love, and Soul with Aretha Franklin, Lou Rawls and Mary Wilson. They were also part of the 'Best Disco In Town 2004 Tour' with the Pointer Sisters, Chic, the Emotions, and Evelyn "Champagne" King. They also took part in the 2007 'Best Disco In Town' tour of the United Kingdom in May 2007.

In 2008, the group released the album Helen, Valerie, Cynthia: The Greatest Hits, which included completely new recordings of the group's biggest hits and some fan favourites.

The group, together with Pinkney, received various honours during 2007 and 2008, through BEMA (The Black Entertainment and Music Association) and the City of Philadelphia for their contribution to music over five decades, creating, for the first time, The Four Degrees.

Pinkney died on June 27, 2009, in a hospital in Lansdale, Pennsylvania, after a short illness at the age of 61. Her 1979 solo album, One Degree, was re-released on CD shortly after her death.

In 2009, the group released their first studio album in over ten years, Undercover 2009. It contained a selection of eight cover versions of classic songs by ABBA, Stevie Wonder, Paul Simon and Bee Gees. The following year they released a new single "Holding Back".

In January 2011, Freddi Poole replaced Cynthia Garrison who was suffering from Piriformis syndrome.

In 2016, the Three Degrees released their first studio album with member Freddi Poole entitled Strategy: Our Tribute To Philadelphia, through Cherry Red Records.

Helen Scott's performing career was hindered by a COVID-19 infection with persistent after-effects. Victoria Wallace died in October 2023. Cynthia Garrison died on January 22, 2024.

== Discography ==
- Maybe (1970)
- So Much Love (1971)
- The Three Degrees (1973)
- International (1975)
- Take Good Care of Yourself (1975, UK)
- With Love (1975, Benelux)
- A Toast of Love (1976)
- Standing Up for Love (1977)
- New Dimensions (1978)
- 3D (1979)
- Album of Love (1982)
- ...And Holding (1989)
- Out of the Past into the Future (1993)
- Christmas with the Three Degrees (1998)
- Undercover 2009 (2009)
- Strategy – Our Tribute to Philadelphia (2016)

== Filmography ==
- The French Connection (1971)
- Sanford and Son (Season 3, Episode 4 titled “Presenting the Three Degrees” aired October 5, 1973)
- Birds of Prey (2020)

== See also ==
- List of funk musicians
- List of disco artists (S-Z)
- List of people from Philadelphia
- List of artists who reached number one in the United States
- List of artists who reached number one on the UK Singles Chart
