= The Three Degrees (album) =

Studio album by the Three Degrees
- Released: 1973
- Recorded: 1972–73
- Studio: Sigma Sound, Philadelphia, Pennsylvania
- Genre: Philadelphia soul; disco
- Length: 30:56
- Label: Philadelphia International
- Producer: Kenneth Gamble & Leon Huff

The Three Degrees chronology
Maybe (1970)	The Three Degrees (1973)	The Three Degrees & MFSB Show (1974)

Professional ratings
Review scores
Source	Rating
AllMusic	4/5 stars

The Three Degrees is a 1973 studio album released by girl group the Three Degrees. Since their formation in 1965 until 1969, the Three Degrees had released several hit singles on various labels, including Swan Records, Warner Bros. Records, Metromedia, and Neptune. Their first studio album, entitled Maybe, was released on Roulette Records in 1970 as were several other singles on the same label.

This was the first studio album recorded by the group for Philadelphia International Records and was produced by Kenny Gamble and Leon Huff. Released in 1973, the album includes three hit singles, "Dirty Ol' Man", a number 1 hit single in the Netherlands, "Year of Decision", and the UK number 1 "When Will I See You Again". The album charted at number 11 on the UK album chart.

The album was re-issued on CD in 2010, for the first time in the UK, by Big Break Records. This re-issue includes three bonus tracks including a 1977 remix of "Dirty Ol' Man" by Tom Moulton.

== Track listing ==
Side one
No.	Title	Writer(s)	Length
1.	"Dirty Ol' Man"	Kenneth Gamble, Leon Huff	4:33
2.	"Can't You See What You're Doing to Me"	Joseph B. Jefferson, Bruce Hawes	2:31
3.	"A Woman Needs a Good Man"	Bunny Sigler, Mikki Farrow, Marvin E. Jackson	4:19
4.	"When Will I See You Again"	Kenneth Gamble, Leon Huff	2:58
Total length:			14:21

Side two
No.	Title	Writer(s)	Length
5.	"I Didn't Know"	Bunny Sigler, Jean Lang	2:50
6.	"I Like Being a Woman"	Joseph B. Jefferson, Bruce Hawes	3:56
7.	"If and When"	Joseph B. Jefferson, Bunny Sigler	7:07
8.	"Year of Decision"	Kenneth Gamble, Leon Huff	2:42
Total length:			16:35

2010 remastered reissue bonus tracks
No.	Title	Writer(s)	Length
9.	"TSOP (The Sound of Philadelphia)" (MFSB featuring The Three Degrees)	Kenneth Gamble, Leon Huff	3:45
10.	"Love Is the Message" (MFSB featuring The Three Degrees)	Kenneth Gamble, Leon Huff	2:41
11.	"Dirty Ol' Man" (A Tom Moulton Mix)	Kenneth Gamble, Leon Huff	8:21
Total length:			45:43

== Personnel ==
The Three Degrees

- Sheila Ferguson – vocals
- Valerie Holiday – vocals
- Fayette Pinkney – vocals

with:

- MFSB – music
- Bobby Martin, Lenny Pakula, Norman Harris, Richie Rome – arrangements

Technical

- Joe Tarsia – recording engineer
- Owen Brown – photography

== Charts ==
Chart (1973)	Peak positions
Australia (Kent Music Report)	46
U.S. Billboard Top LPs	28
U.S. Billboard Top Soul LPs	33
UK Albums Chart	11

=== Singles ===
Year	Single	Peak chart positions			
Year	Single	US	US R&B	US A/C	UK
1973	"Dirty Ol' Man"	—	58	—	—
1974	"Year of Decision"	—	74	—	13
1974	"When Will I See You Again"	2	4	1	1
1975	"I Didn't Know"	—	18	—	—
