= New Dimensions =

Studio album by The Three Degrees
- Released: October 1978
- Recorded: 1978
- Studios: Wessex Studios, London, England; Westlake Studios, Los Angeles, California; Larrabee North, North Hollywood, California
- Genres: Disco; R&B; pop
- Label: Ariola
- Producer: Giorgio Moroder

The Three Degrees chronology
Standing Up for Love (1977)	New Dimensions (1978)	3D (1979)

Professional ratings
Review scores
Source	Rating
Allmusic	1.5/5 stars

New Dimensions is a studio album by the American vocal trio The Three Degrees. Released in 1978, the album was produced by Giorgio Moroder and yielded three UK Top 20 hit singles, "Giving Up, Giving In" (UK No. 12), "Woman in Love" (UK No. 3), and "The Runner" (UK No. 10). The album peaked at No. 34 in the UK Album Chart in early 1979.

The rights to the Ariola Records back catalogue are now held by Sony BMG Music Entertainment. New Dimensions has been released on compact disc in Japan in 2008, and was released on compact disc in the UK in 2010 by BBR Records with seven bonus tracks.

== Track listing ==
Side A:

1. "Giving Up, Giving In" (Giorgio Moroder, Pete Belotte) – 6:07
2. "Falling in Love Again" (Giorgio Moroder, Pete Belotte) – 5:34
3. "Looking for Love" (Giorgio Moroder, Pete Belotte) – 5:26

Side B:

1. "The Runner" (Sheila Ferguson, Giorgio Moroder) – 6:18
2. "Woman in Love" (Dominic Bugatti, Frank Musker) – 5:16
3. "Magic in the Air" (Giorgio Moroder, Pete Belotte) – 5:45

Compact disc re-issue 2010 (UK)

7. "Giving Up Giving In" (7" Single version)

8. "Woman in Love" (7" Single version)

9. "The Runner" (7" Single version)

10. "Falling in Love Again" (7" Single version)

11. "Out of Love Again" (Giorgio Moroder, Pete Belotte) (B-side)

12. "The Golden Lady" (George Garvarantz, Sheila Ferguson) (OST album version from The Golden Lady)

13. "The Runner" (12" Extra Long Version)

== Personnel ==
- Sheila Ferguson – vocals
- Valerie Holiday – vocals
- Helen Scott – vocals

== Production ==
- Giorgio Moroder – producer
- Robin Branchflower, Georges Garvarentz, Del Newman – producers on CD re-issue, track 12 "The Golden Lady"
- Greg Mathieson – arranger
- Jürgen Koppers – engineer
- Bill Smith – artwork
- Gered Mankowitz – photography
- Side A recorded at Wessex Studios, London. Mixed at Musicland Studios, Munich.
- Side B recorded & mixed at Westlake & Larrebee Studio, Los Angeles.

== Charts ==
Chart (1978/79)	Peak position
Australia (Kent Music Report)	97
United Kingdom (Official Charts Company)	34
United States (Billboard 200)	169
