= 3D (The Three Degrees album) =

Studio album by The Three Degrees
- Released: 1979
- Recorded: 1979
- Studio: Musicland, Munich, Germany
- Genre: Disco; R&B; pop
- Label: Ariola
- Producer: Giorgio Moroder, Harold Faltermeyer

The Three Degrees chronology
| New Dimensions (1978) | 3D (1979) | A Collection of their 20 Greatest Hits (1979) |

Professional ratings
Review scores
| Source | Rating |
|---|---|
| Allmusic | 3/5 stars |
| Music Week | 4/4 stars |
| Smash Hits | 4/10 |

3D is a studio album by vocal trio The Three Degrees released in late 1979. The album, which was produced by Giorgio Moroder and Harold Faltermeyer, yielded two successful single releases, "Jump the Gun" and "My Simple Heart". "Without You" and "Starlight" were also released as singles, but failed to make any impact on the singles chart. In the US "Set Me Free" was released and was a hit in the clubs and US Disco Charts. The album peaked at No. 61 in the UK album charts.

The rights to the Ariola Records back catalogue are now held by Sony BMG Music Entertainment – the original 3D album in its entirety was finally released on compact disc in Japan in late 2008. The album was re-issued on CD in the UK in March 2011 by BBR Records with nine bonus tracks.

== Track listing ==
Side A
| No. | Title | Writer(s) | Length |
|---|---|---|---|
| 1. | "Jump the Gun" | Harold Faltermeyer, Keith Forsey | 6:05 |
| 2. | "Red Light" | Giorgio Moroder, Chris Bennett | 5:43 |
| 3. | "Set Me Free" | Giorgio Moroder, Chris Bennett | 4:36 |

Side B
| No. | Title | Writer(s) | Length |
|---|---|---|---|
| 4. | "Starlight" | Harold Faltermeyer, Keith Forsey | 4:40 |
| 5. | "My Simple Heart" | Dominic Bugatti, Frank Musker | 4:30 |
| 6. | "Without You" | Harold Faltermeyer, Keith Forsey | 4:06 |
| 7. | "Bodycheck" | Giorgio Moroder, Harold Faltermeyer, Keith Forsey | 3:36 |

2011 CD reissue
| No. | Title | Writer(s) | Length |
|---|---|---|---|
| 8. | "Hot Summer Night" (Single B-side) | Giorgio Moroder, Chris Bennett | 4:43 |
| 9. | "Jump the Gun" (Single Version) | Harold Faltermeyer, Keith Forsey | 3:56 |
| 10. | "My Simple Heart" (Single Version) | Dominic Bugatti, Frank Musker | 3:42 |
| 11. | "Without You" (Single Version) | Harold Faltermeyer, Keith Forsey | 3:33 |
| 12. | "Starlight" (Single Version) | Harold Faltermeyer, Keith Forsey | 3:24 |
| 13. | "Jump the Gun" (12" Long Version) | Harold Faltermeyer, Keith Forsey | 8:05 |
| 14. | "My Simple Heart" (12" Long Version) | Dominic Bugatti, Frank Musker | 5:12 |
| 15. | "Bodycheck" (12" Long Version) | Giorgio Moroder, Harold Faltermeyer, Keith Forsey | 4:03 |
| 16. | "Set Me Free" (12" Long Version) | Giorgio Moroder, Chris Bennett | 7:13 |

== Personnel ==
- Sheila Ferguson – vocals
- Valerie Holiday – vocals
- Helen Scott – vocals

== Production ==
- Giorgio Moroder – co-producer
- Harold Faltermeyer – co-producer, arranger
- Keith Forsey – arranger
- Jürgen Koppers – engineer
- Recorded at Musicland Studios, Munich.
