= Fayette Pinkney =

American singer (1948–2009)

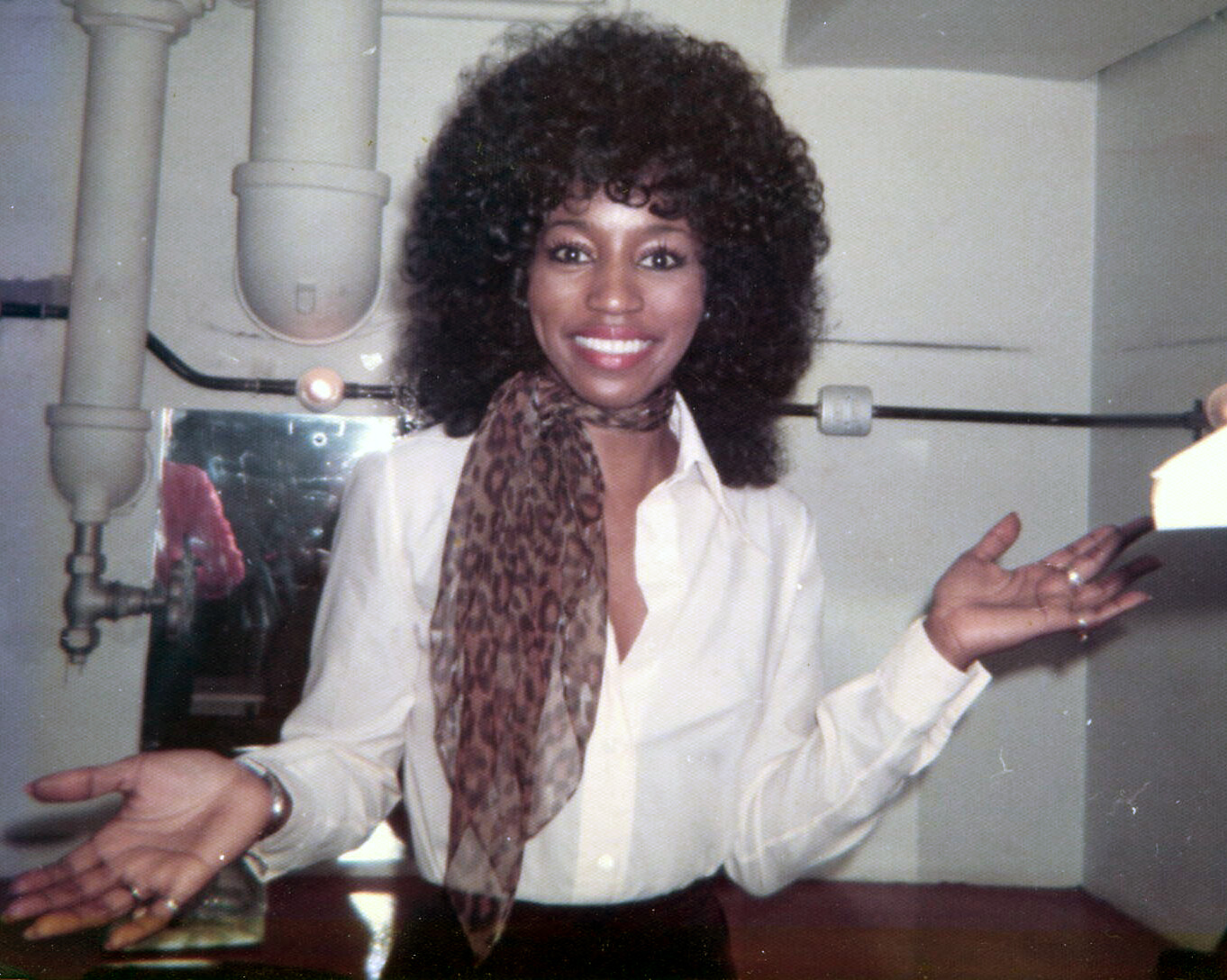
- Pinkney in 1974

Background information
- Born: Fayette Regina Pinkney; January 10, 1948; Philadelphia, Pennsylvania, U.S.
- Died: June 27, 2009 (aged 61) Lansdale, Pennsylvania, U.S.
- Genres: Pop, soul
- Occupations: Singer, psychologist, vocal coach
- Instrument: Vocals
- Years active: 1963–2009
- Formerly of: The Three Degrees

Fayette Regina Pinkney (January 10, 1948 – June 27, 2009) was an American singer and an original member of the musical trio The Three Degrees.

== Early life and education ==
Born in Philadelphia, Pennsylvania, Pinkney was one of three young teenagers brought together by manager Richard Barrett to form The Three Degrees in 1963.

Fayette subsequently earned a bachelor's degree in psychology from Temple University and a master's degree in human services from Lincoln University in 1984.

== Career ==
She was a part of The Three Degrees through their most prominent years with Roulette and Philadelphia International Records and sang on many of their greatest hits, including "When Will I See You Again" and "Take Good Care of Yourself", as well as reaching the top of the Billboard US Hot 100 when the group were the featured vocalists on the MFSB single "TSOP (The Sound of Philadelphia)" in 1974. She left the group in 1976. She traveled to London in January 1979 to record her only solo album, One Degree, which she completed in just two weeks; it was met with critical and fan acclaim upon its release.

She later worked as a counselor and vocal coach and, in addition to singing with her church's Inspirational Choir of the Salem Baptist Church, Jenkintown, PA. She traveled with a group called the Intermezzo Choir Ministry, under the leadership of Ms. Verolga Nix.

== Personal life ==
In 1994, Pinkney gave birth to a daughter, Ayana Alexandria Medeiros, who died two days later due to sudden infant death syndrome.

== Death ==
On June 27, 2009, Pinkney died of acute respiratory failure following a short and sudden illness at the age of 61.

== Discography ==
- One Degree (Chopper Records, 1979)
