= When Will I See You Again =

1974 single by the Three Degrees

Single by the Three Degrees

from the album The Three Degrees
- B-side: "I Didn't Know"
- Released: June 21, 1974 (UK); September 6, 1974 (U.S.)
- Recorded: 1973
- Genre: Philadelphia soul
- Length: 3:00
- Label: Philadelphia International
- Songwriter: Gamble and Huff
- Producers: Gamble and Huff

The Three Degrees singles chronology
| "Love Is the Message" (1974) | "When Will I See You Again" (1974) | "Get Your Love Back" (1974) |

"When Will I See You Again" is a song released in 1974 by American soul group the Three Degrees from their third album, The Three Degrees. The song was written and produced by Kenny Gamble and Leon Huff. Sheila Ferguson sang the lead, accompanied by Fayette Pinkney and Valerie Holiday. Billboard named the song number 67 on their list of 100 Greatest Girl Group Songs of All Time.

== Background ==
Sheila Ferguson recalled that "the song was played to me by Kenny Gamble at the piano in 1973 and I threw a tantrum. I screamed and yelled and said I would never sing it. I thought it was ridiculously insulting to be given such a simple song and that it took no talent to sing it. We did do it and several million copies later, I realized that he knew more than me." She would later have a number-60 hit with a solo remake of the track in 1994. The song is unique in that every sentence is a question, heightening the overall effect and emotion.

The Three Degrees performed the song at Charles III's 30th birthday party at Buckingham Palace in 1978 (when he was known as Prince Charles) as he had stated that the song was a favourite of his.

== Chart performance ==
It was one of the most successful recordings of the "Philly soul" era. The first station in the United States to broadcast the song was WFIL AM 560 in Philadelphia courtesy of disc jockey George Michael. It would be his last day at WFIL before taking a gig at WABC Radio in New York. In the US, "When Will I See You Again" peaked at number 2 on the Pop singles chart, behind "Kung Fu Fighting" by Carl Douglas. The song reached number one on the Adult Contemporary chart, and number 4 on the R&B chart in the US in the autumn of 1974. In the UK, it fared even better, spending two weeks at the top of the UK Singles Chart in August 1974.

== Charts ==
=== Weekly charts ===
| Chart (1974–1975) | Peak position |
|---|---|
| Australia (Kent Music Report) | 2 |
| Belgium | 2 |
| Canada RPM Adult Contemporary | 1 |
| Canada RPM Top Singles | 5 |
| Ireland | 2 |
| Germany | 27 |
| Netherlands | 3 |
| South Africa (Springbok Radio) | 2 |
| UK Singles Chart | 1 |
| US Billboard Hot 100 | 2 |
| US Billboard Easy Listening | 1 |
| US Billboard Hot Soul Singles | 4 |
| US Cash Box Top 100 | 1 |

=== Year-end charts ===
| Chart (1974) | Rank |
|---|---|
| Australia (Kent Music Report) | 21 |
| Canada | 61 |
| Netherlands (Single Top 100) | 37 |
| South Africa | 19 |

| Chart (1975) | Rank |
|---|---|
| US Billboard Hot 100 | 75 |
| US Cash Box Top 100 | 93 |

== Certifications ==
| Region | Certification | Certified units/sales |
|---|---|---|
| New Zealand (RMNZ) | Gold | 15,000^{‡} |
| United Kingdom (BPI) | Silver | 200,000^{‡} |
| United States (RIAA) | Platinum | 1,000,000^{^} |
^{^} Shipments figures based on certification alone.^{‡} Sales+streaming figures based on certification alone.

== Brother Beyond version ==
"When Will I See You Again"

Single by Brother Beyond

from the album Trust
- Released: December 8, 1989
- Recorded: 1989
- Genre: Pop
- Length: 3:34
- Label: Parlophone
- Songwriter: Gamble and Huff

Brother Beyond singles chronology
| "Drive On" (1989) | "When Will I See You Again" (1989) | "Trust" (1990) |

British boy band Brother Beyond covered the song on their 1989 album Trust, that was also released in the Compilation Ronny's Pop Show [1990/1] – Hochfeine Pop-Musik-Schallplatte.

=== Track listings ===
CD maxi

1. "When Will I See You Again" (radio mix) – 4:28
2. "New Heights (The Clompete mix)" (Cloud 9 mix) – 4:25
3. "When Will I See You Again (extended)" (Gee extended mix) – 6:42

7" single

1. When Will I See You Again – 3:35
2. New Heights (edit) – 3:20

=== Charts ===
| Chart (1989) | Peak position |
|---|---|
| UK Singles (Official Charts) | 43 |
| Zimbabwe (ZIMA) | 13 |

== Thomas Anders version ==
"When Will I See You Again"

Single by Thomas Anders feat. the Three Degrees

from the album When Will I See You Again
- Released: July 18, 1993
- Recorded: 1992
- Genre: Pop
- Length: 3:30
- Label: Polydor
- Songwriter: Gamble and Huff
- Producers: Christian De Walden, Ralf Stemmann

Thomas Anders feat. the Three Degrees singles chronology
| "Standing Alone" (1992) | "When Will I See You Again" (1993) | "I'll Love You Forever" (1993) |

In 1993, Thomas Anders released his version of the song with the Three Degrees, which appeared on the same-named album. The success of the cover version was modest. The following year, Anders released a Spanish-language version of the song titled Una mañana de sol.

=== Track listings ===
CD maxi

1. "When Will I See You Again" – 3:30
2. "Is It My Love" – 3:40
3. "When Will I See You Again" (extended version) – 5:15

7" single

1. "When Will I See You Again" (Precious String-House mix) – 4:45
2. "When Will I See You Again" (Precious club mix) – 5:10
3. "When Will I See You Again" (Precious Outerspace mix) – 5:32
4. "When Will I See You Again" (Precious pop mix) – 5:28

=== Charts ===
| Chart (1993) | Peak position |
|---|---|
| German Singles Chart | 37 |

== Other cover versions ==
- Geoffrey Chung arranged a reggae version released as a 7" on the Antrim label in 1974.
- The O'Jays covered the song and named their 1983 album on Philadelphia International after it, as well.
- Magda Layna released the song as a single on Megatone Records in 1983.
- PJ Harvey released a cover of the song for short film Amaeru Fallout 1972, directed by Sarah Miles in 1997.
- Jahred Gomes released the song under the name "When" on his solo Unite EP (March 27, 2012).
- U2 covered the song on their Elevation Tour following 9/11. The names of the victims of the terrorist attacks were shown on the screen when they played the song
