= Let Yourself Go: The '70s Albums, Vol 2 – 1974–1977: The Final Sessions =

Box set by The Supremes
- Released: May 17, 2011
- Recorded: 1974–1977
- Genre: Pop, R&B, disco
- Length: 3:00:00
- Label: Motown, Hip-O Select

The Supremes chronology
Icon: Diana Ross & the Supremes (2010)	Let Yourself Go: The '70s Albums, Vol 2 – 1974–1977: The Final Sessions (2011)	50th Anniversary: The Singles Collection 1961–1969 (2011)

Professional ratings
Review scores
Source	Rating
Allmusic	4.0/5 stars
BBC	(Favorable)

Let Yourself Go, the follow-up box set to This Is the Story: The '70s Albums, Vol. 1 – 1970–1973: The Jean Terrell Years, comprises The Supremes' albums from 1974 to 1977, featuring original member Mary Wilson, longtime member Cindy Birdsong, newest member Scherrie Payne, and final Supreme Susaye Greene. Included in this set are The Supremes' final three studio albums released in their entirety on CD for the first time. Also included are several unreleased and alternate takes.

After a two and a half year absence of no recordings from the Supremes, Motown finally released The Supremes in June 1975, the first of the three albums in this set. The lead single "He's My Man" went to #1 on the disco charts and peaked at #69 on the r&b chart. Mary Wilson and Scherrie Payne split the leads on this album as well as the other two LP releases High Energy released in April 1976 at which time Cindy left the group but is heard on all of the tracks and was replaced by Susaye Greene. Her lead vocal graces the lead track "High Energy" and also is featured on the single "I'm Gonna let My Heart Do the Walking" which was the last top 40 single for the Supremes and features Scherrie Payne on lead vocals. There is a bonus alternate track of this single on this cd featuring Susaye Greene who has a 5 octave range vocal. The final album released in October 1976, Mary, Scherrie, & Susaye featuring the singles "You're My Driving Wheel" hitting the lower reaches of the Billboard Pop chart, and the follow-up single "Let Yourself Go" which missed the charts altogether, features some great disco tracks such as "Love I Never Knew You Could Feel So Good". This album shares similarities with the Supremes first album, Meet The Supremes, in that they both feature all three Supremes on lead vocals and did not make the Billboard Charts.

== Track listing ==
CD 1

1. "He's My Man"
2. "Early Morning Love"
3. "Where Is It I Belong"
4. "It’s All Been Said Before"
5. "This Is Why I Believe in You"
6. "You Can’t Stop a Girl in Love"
7. "Color My World Blue"
8. "Give Out, But Don’t Give Up"
9. "Where Do I Go from Here"
10. "You Turn Me Around"
  - tracks 1–10: "The Supremes" (1975)
11. "The Shoop Shoop Song (It's in His Kiss)"
12. "The Sha-La Bandit [Alternate Version 3]"
13. "Color My World Blue [Alternate Version]"
14. "Mr. Boogie"
15. "Dance Fever"
16. "Seed of Love"
17. "Give Out, But Don’t Give Up [Group Lead Version]"
18. "You Can’t Stop a Girl in Love [Early Version]"
19. "Bend A Little [Extended Version]"
20. "I Can Never Recover"
21. "Can We Love Again"
22. "Where Do I Go from Here [Single Remix]"
23. "The Sha-La Bandit [Alternate Version 1]"
24. "He's My Man [Extended Version]"
  - tracks 11–24: "The Supremes Sessions and More"
  - tracks 11–20: "Previously Unreleased"

CD 2

1. "High Energy"
2. "I'm Gonna Let My Heart Do the Walking"
3. "Only You (Can Love Me Like You Love Me)"
4. "You Keep Me Moving On"
5. "Don’t Let My Teardrops Bother You"
6. "Till The Boat Sails Away"
7. "I Don’t Want To Lose You"
8. "You’re What’s Missing In My Life"
9. "High Energy [Russ Terrana Mix]"
10. "I’m Gonna Let My Heart Do The Walking [Russ Terrana Mix]"
11. "Only You (Can Love Me Like You Love Me) [Russ Terrana Mix]"
12. "You Keep Me Moving On [Russ Terrana Mix]"
13. "Don’t Let My Teardrops Bother You [Russ Terrana Mix]"
14. "Till The Boat Sails Away [Russ Terrana Mix]"
15. "I Don’t Want To Lose You [Russ Terrana Mix]"
16. "You’re What’s Missing In My Life [Russ Terrana Mix]"
17. "There’s Room At The Top [Alternate Version]"
18. "You’re What’s Missing In My Life [Mary Wilson Lead Version]"
19. "I’m Gonna Let My Heart Do The Walking [Susaye Greene Lead Version]"
  - tracks 1–16: "High Energy" (1976)
  - tracks 17–19: "The High Energy Sessions"
  - tracks 11, 12 and 14–19: "Previously Unreleased"

CD 3

1. "You're My Driving Wheel"
2. "Sweet Dream Machine"
3. "Let Yourself Go"
4. "Come Into My Life"
5. "We Should Be Closer Together"
6. "I Don’t Want To Be Tied Down"
7. "You Are The Heart Of Me"
8. "Love, I Never Knew You Could Feel So Good"
9. "Give Out, But Don’t Give Up [Mary Wilson Lead Version]"
10. "High Energy [Alternate Version]"
11. "I’m Gonna Let My Heart Do The Walking [Alternate Version]"
12. Only You (Can Love Me Like You Love Me) [Alternate Version]"
13. "You’re What’s Missing In My Life [Scherrie Payne Lead Version]"
14. "You’re My Driving Wheel [Alternate Version]"
15. "Sweet Dream Machine [Alternate Version]"
16. "I Never Knew You Could Feel So Good [Alternate Version]"
  - tracks 1–8: "Mary, Scherrie & Susaye" (1976)
  - tracks 9–16: "Additional Supreme Alternates"
  - tracks 9–16: "Previously Unreleased"

== Personnel ==
- Scherrie Payne: lead- and background vocals
- Mary Wilson: lead- and background vocals
- Cindy Birdsong: lead- and background vocals
- Susaye Greene: lead- and background vocals
