= The Supremes ('70s): Greatest Hits and Rare Classics =

Compilation album by The Supremes
- Released: 1991
- Recorded: 1970–1978
- Genre: R&B, pop, soul, psychedelic pop
- Length: N/A
- Label: Motown
- Producer: Various

The Supremes chronology
Love Supreme (1988)	The Supremes ('70s): Greatest Hits and Rare Classics (1991)	Anthology (1995)

Professional ratings
Review scores
Source	Rating
Allmusic	3/5 stars

The Supremes ('70s): Greatest Hits and Rare Classics is a 1991 compilation album by The Supremes, released on the Motown label. The compilation features a majority of the group's 1970's hits, as well as one solo song by Jean Terrell "I Had To Fall In Love", which was released in 1978 on A&M Records, and two solo tracks by Scherrie Payne, "When I Looked At Your Face" and "Another Life From Now". Three tracks "Everybody's Got the Right to Love" "Floy Joy" and "Automatically Sunshine" also appear in alternate versions.

This release did not include the singles "Your Wonderful Sweet, Sweet Love", "High Energy", or any of the duet singles the Supremes recorded with The Four Tops.

A cassette version was also released with a different track listing and only 19 tracks.

== Track listing ==
1. "Up the Ladder to the Roof" – 3:15 taken from the album 'Right On'
2. "Nathan Jones" – 3:02 taken from the album 'Touch'
3. "I Guess I'll Miss the Man" – 2:37 taken from the album 'The Supremes Produced and Arranged by Jimmy Webb'
4. "Stoned Love" – 2:57 taken from the album 'New Ways But Love Stays'
5. "Everybody's Got the Right to Love" – 2:40 taken from the album 'Right On'
6. "Floy Joy" – 2:46 alternate version
7. "Bad Weather" – 3:16 non-album single
8. "Automatically Sunshine" – 3:04 alternate version
9. "Paradise" – 4:20 taken from the album 'Produced And Arranged by Jimmy Webb'
10. "Tossin' and Turnin'" – 3:00 taken from the album 'Produced And Arranged by Jimmy Webb'
11. "Il Voce de Silenzio (Silent Voices)" – 3:40 taken from the album 'Produced And Arranged by Jimmy Webb'
12. "Love Train" – 3:21 non-album track.
13. "I Had to Fall in Love" (Jean Terrell solo) – 3:24
14. "He's My Man" – 3:02 taken from the album 'The Supremes'
15. "Color My World Blue" – 2:34 taken from the album 'The Supremes'
16. "You Turn Me Around" – 2:34 taken from the album 'The Supremes'
17. "The Sha-La Bandit" – 3:17 non-album track.
18. "This Is Why I Believe in You" – 3:10 taken from the album 'The Supremes'
19. "I'm Gonna Let My Heart Do the Walking" – 3:10 taken from the album 'High Energy'
20. "You're My Driving Wheel" – 3:24 taken from the album 'Mary, Scherrie & Susaye'
21. "When I Looked at Your Face" (Scherrie Payne solo) – 4:12
22. "Another Life from Now" (Scherrie Payne solo) – 5:46 taken from the album 'Partners'

== Cassette Tape listing ==
Side 1:

1. "Up the Ladder to the Roof"
2. "Everybody's Got the Right to Love"
3. "Stoned Love"
4. "Nathan Jones"
5. "Touch"
6. "Floy Joy"
7. "Automatically Sunshine"
8. "I Guess I'll Miss the Man"
9. "Bad Weather"
10. "I Had to Fall in Love"

Side 2:

1. "It's All Been Said Before"
2. "He's My Man"
3. "Where Do I Go From Here"
4. "I'm Gonna Let My Heart Do the Walking"
5. "High Energy"
6. "You're My Driving Wheel"
7. "Let Yourself Go"
8. "Fly"
9. "When I Looked At Your Face"

=== Personnel ===
- Mary Wilson: vocals
- Cindy Birdsong: vocals
- Jean Terrell: vocals
- Scherrie Payne: vocals
- Lynda Laurence: vocals
- Susaye Greene: vocals
