= Former Ladies of the Supremes =

American female vocal group

- The group in the early 1990s. Left to right: Lynda Laurence, Jean Terrell, Scherrie Payne.

Background information
- Also known as: FLOS
- Genres: Pop; R&B; soul; dance
- Years active: 1986–present
- Spinoff of: The Supremes
- Members: Scherrie Payne; Lynda Lawrence; Joyce Vincent
- Past members: Jean Terrell; Cindy Birdsong; Sundray Tucker; Freddi Poole; Susaye Greene
- Website: formersupremes.com

Former Ladies of the Supremes, or FLOS, is a female vocal group that was originally formed in 1986 by former Supremes members Jean Terrell, Cindy Birdsong and Scherrie Payne. It has also included former members Lynda Laurence and Susaye Greene. Though they were not Supremes members, singers Sundray Tucker, Freddi Poole and Joyce Vincent have also sung with the group following the departure of Terrell.

== Biography ==
=== Early years (1976–1986) ===
In 1976, it was rumored in Jet magazine that former Supremes Jean Terrell and Cindy Birdsong had contacted Florence Ballard to form a new singing group. However, Ballard's death in February of that year quickly cancelled their plan.

In 1985, eight years after the group officially broke up in 1977, Scherrie Payne was signed to SuperStar International Records, a Los Angeles-based record company. Her then-partner, Ronnie Phillips, approached her with the idea of reforming the Supremes, to which she agreed, and asked Birdsong and Mary Wilson to join the new Supremes group. Wilson declined, continuing her solo career, while Birdsong agreed and persuaded Terrell to join. At this time, Wilson was involved in a lawsuit regarding the rights of the Supremes name. She won the lawsuit in 1987 to use the name.

Due to contractual difficulties over the ownership of the name, Payne, Birdsong, and Terrell decided to create a spinoff group of the Supremes using the abbreviation "FLOS", for the pseudonym "Former Ladies of the Supremes". As the group started to take off, Birdsong was offered a contract at Hi-Hat Records, and left for a solo career. In her place, former member Supreme Lynda Laurence joined the lineup, replacing Cindy just as she had in 1972.

=== Early beginnings (1986–1993) ===
The newly formed lineup of Payne, Terrell, and Laurence released the song "We're Back" for SuperStar International Records. However, since SuperStar did not have national distribution, the song failed to chart, and the label soon folded. The group began to perform and tour, making their debut performance at the Wilshire Ebell Theatre in Los Angeles in 1987.

By 1989, Rick Gianatos brought the group to Motorcity Records, a record label owned by Ian Levine. There, they recorded covers of the Supremes' biggest hits, as well and other songs such as "Crazy 'bout the Guy", "I Want to Be Loved", and "Hit and Miss". This would continue until Motorcity folded.

=== Mid-career (1993–2009) ===
The lineup changed again, when in 1993, Terrell left and was replaced by Sundray Tucker (Lynda Laurence's sister). This trio toured the world and recorded several albums, including Supreme Voices and Supremely Yours.

In 1996, Tucker left the trio and Terrell made a brief comeback to the group, reuniting with Payne and Laurence for two special concerts held at the Industry Cafe in Los Angeles. This reunion ended with the recruitment of Freddi Poole in July 1996. Poole, an established singer who had worked with the likes of Patti LaBelle, Gladys Knight, and Sammy Davis Jr., stayed with the group until September 2009.

In that same year, Mary Wilson sued the group. The lawsuit was filed against Lynda Laurence, Scherrie Payne, and Jean Terrell, who were performing as the "Former Ladies of the Supremes." In 1999, Wilson lost the lawsuit.

In 2000, Payne and Laurence joined Diana Ross on the brief but highly publicized and later cancelled Return to Love Tour, billed as Diana Ross & the Supremes. The tour made TV appearances on The Oprah Winfrey Show, The Today Show, VH1 Divas Live, and The View.

In 2005, the trio was honored by the Hollywood History Museum. The museum presented an exhibit showing their contribution to the Supremes' legacy and FLOS' history. Payne and Laurence donated stage gowns and shoes from their personal collection, along with photos, record albums, tour books, and posters.

Although recording sessions were sporadic during her tenure, Poole contributed to the group's 2006 single "Sisters United (We’re Taking Control)".

In 2007, Joyce Vincent Wilson of Tony Orlando and Dawn briefly filled in for Poole for a tour in Japan after Poole's mother's death. That same year, their CD was released featuring solo leads of the group, including a remake of Payne's 1984 solo single "One Night Only".

=== 2009–2024 ===
On September 29, 2009, it was reported on Payne and Laurence's website that Poole had left the group, later to join female trio the Three Degrees. Joyce Vincent Wilson joined the group, replacing Poole. Notably, Vincent had once been considered as a replacement in an official grouping of the Supremes following Mary Wilson's departure. It was decided by Motown that the group should not continue without an original member, and the Supremes disbanded in 1977.

On October 6, 2017, it was reported via Facebook that after 31 years in the group, Laurence had departed the group and had been replaced by Susaye Greene. Greene had been a member of the Supremes from early 1976 to the summer of 1977 (replacing Cindy Birdsong), and performed on their albums High Energy and Mary, Scherrie & Susaye. Ironically, this grouping of Payne, Wilson, and Greene had almost been realized in 1977 when original Supreme Mary Wilson departed the group; however, the group was dissolved before Wilson could join. Wilson also had provided background vocals for Payne and Greene's duet album Partners in 1978.

In December 2018, the group released their first recent music together, the four-track Christmas-themed A Supreme Christmas EP, followed by the single "Unconditional Love" in 2019. In that same year, they participated in the Oak Leaf Festival.

Following the death of Mary Wilson in 2021, the group (especially Payne) paid tribute to their former bandmate via social media and in concert.

In 2022, Payne, Laurence, and Greene performed at the Wallis Annenberg Center for the Performing Arts in Beverly Hills, California, as one of the Motown-based groups highlighting the performance, in honor of the label. This marked the first time that this trio of former Supremes performed together; it was also the first time since 2000 that three Motown-signed Supremes performed together.

Lynda, Joyce, and Scherrie in 2025

=== 2024–present ===
On June 14, 2024, Payne reported that Greene had departed the group to spend time on her "entrepreneurial endeavors", and that Laurence would be returning.

On July 18, 2026, the Former Ladies celebrated their 40th anniversary with a special show at the Catalina Jazz Club in Los Angeles, California. Special guests included former FLOs Freddi Poole and Susaye Greene. The star-studded event featured special guests Freda Payne, Scherrie's daughter Shoshana, Lynda's son Trevor Lawrence Jr., Joyce's sister Pamela Vincent, and Cindy Birdsong's son, David.

== Members ==
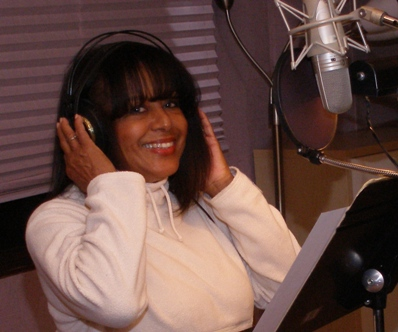
Payne in 2011

Scherrie Payne has remained part of the FLOS since its inception. The group has also included former Supremes Cindy Birdsong, Jean Terrell, Lynda Laurence, and Susaye Greene, as well as Sundray Tucker, Freddi Poole, and Joyce Vincent Wilson.

Members of Former Ladies of the Supremes
1986	Scherrie Payne	Jean Terrell	Cindy Birdsong
1986–1992	Scherrie Payne	Jean Terrell	Lynda Laurence
1993–1996	Scherrie Payne	Sundray Tucker	Lynda Laurence
1996–2009	Scherrie Payne	Freddi Poole	Lynda Laurence
2009–2017	Scherrie Payne	Joyce Vincent Wilson	Lynda Laurence
2017–2024	Scherrie Payne	Joyce Vincent Wilson	Susaye Greene
2024–present	Scherrie Payne	Joyce Vincent Wilson	Lynda Laurence

== Discography ==
=== Singles ===
Superstar International Records

- "We're Back" /"Get Away" (with Ollie Woodson of the Temptations) (1987)

Motorcity Records

- "Crazy 'bout the Guy"/"Crazy 'bout the Guy (Instrumental)" MOTC 13 (1990)
- "Stoned Love"/"Crazy 'bout the Guy (live)" MOTC
- "I Want to Be Loved"/"I Want to Be Loved (US Remix)" MOTC77 (1991)
- "Hit And Miss"/"Hit and Miss (US Remix)" MOTC88 (1991)

Driving Wheel Records

- "Stoned Love" DWCD01 (1998)
- "Someday We'll Be Together" DWCD02 (1998)

Additional recordings/singles

- "Light the World (With the Flame of Love)" (2000)
- "Finally / Good Intentions" (2002)
- "Sisters United (We're Taking Control)" (2006)
- "Good Intentions" (2009)
- "Unconditional Love" (2019)
- "Road to Freedom - 2024 Remix" (2024) - as "Supreme Voices" (Scherrie, Lynda, Sundray)

=== Albums ===
- Supreme Voices (1994)
1. "How Do You Keep the Music Playing?"
2. "Rescue Me"
3. "Road to Freedom"
4. "Keep On Loving Me"
5. "Give Me the Night"
6. "Breaking & Entering"
7. "Don't Rock My World"
8. "I'm a Fool for Love"
9. "Piano"
10. "Up the Ladder to the Roof" (featuring guest vocalists Cindy Birdsong and Jayne Edwards).
11. "Somewhere Out There"
- Supremely Yours (1995)
1. "Feel Like Makin' Love"
2. "Who Do You Love"
3. "Just Like That"
4. "Stop to Love"
5. "Private Number"
6. "First Time on a Ferris Wheel"
7. "Colours of Love"
8. "Stop! I Don't Need No Sympathy"
9. "I Still Believe"
10. "Never Can Say Goodbye"
11. "If I Love Again"
12. "Sweet Freedom"
13. "Suave"
14. "Touch"
15. "Private Number" (with Edwin Starr; Slammin' Jammin' Mix)
- Baby Love (1996)
1. "Baby Love"
2. "Love Child"
3. "Nathan Jones"
4. "Stop! In the Name of Love"
5. "Crazy 'bout the Guy"
6. "Hit & Miss"
7. "Stoned Love"
8. "I Want to Be Loved"
9. "I'm Gonna Make You Love Me"
10. "Back By Popular Demand"
- Reflections (1996)
1. "Reflections"
2. "Stop to Love"
3. "Never Can Say Goodbye"
4. "Someday We'll Be Together"
5. "First Time on a Ferris Wheel"
6. "Touch"
7. "Just Like That
8. "Sweet Freedom"
9. "Love Child"
10. "Who Do You Love"
11. "Private Number" - with Edwin Starr
12. "Feel Like Makin' Love"
- Where Did Our Love Go (1996)
1. "Where Did Our Love Go?"
2. "Stoned Love"
3. "I Still Believe"
4. "Baby Love"
5. "You're My Driving Wheel"
6. "Nathan Jones"
7. "Stop, I Don't Need to Sympathy"
8. "You Can't Hurry Love"
9. "If I Love Again"
10. "I Hear a Symphony"
11. "He's My Man"
12. "Colours of Love"
13. "Come See About Me"
14. "I'm Gonna Let My Heart Do the Walking"
15. "Stop! In the Name of Love"
- Simply Supreme (1997)
1. "Stop To Love"
2. "You Can't Hurry Love"
3. "Sweet Freedom"
4. "Someday We'll Be Together"
5. "Feel Like Makin' Love"
6. "Up the Ladder To the Roof"
7. "Private Number"
8. "Stoned Love"
9. "Colours Of Love"
10. "Reflections"
11. "Crumbs Off the Table"
12. "Nathan Jones"
13. "My World Is Empty Without You"
14. "You Make Me Feel Like a Natural Woman (live)
15. "Love Child"
16. "I'm Gonna Let My Heart Do the Walking"
17. "First Time On a Ferris Wheel"
18. "Feelin' Alright"
19. "Baby Love"
20. "Stop! In the Name Of Love"
- Reflections: HITLIST (1998)
1. "Where Did Our Love Go?
2. "Baby Love"
3. "Come See About Me"
4. "Stop! In the Name Of Love"
5. "Back In My Arms Again"
6. "I Hear a Symphony"
7. "My World Is Empty Without You"
8. "You Keep Me Hangin' On"
9. "Love Is Here And Now You're Gone"
10. "The Happening"
11. "Reflections"
12. "Love Child"
13. "Someday We'll Be Together"
14. "Up the Ladder To the Roof"
15. "Stoned Love"
16. "I'm Gonna Let My Heart Do the Walking"
17. "Nathan Jones"
18. "Floy Joy"
19. "Automatically Sunshine"
20. "You Can't Hurry Love"
- The Hits (2001)
1. "Stop! in the Name of Love"
2. "Nathan Jones"
3. "Where Did Our Love Go?"
4. "He's My Man"
5. "Baby Love"
6. "Love Child"
7. "Someday We'll Be Together"
8. "The Happening"
9. "Stoned Love"
10. "Reflections"
11. "You Can't Hurry Love"
12. "Automatically Sunshine"
13. "I Hear a Symphony"
14. "Touch"
15. "Back In My Arms Again"
16. "Up the Ladder To the Roof"
17. "I Guess I'll Miss the Man"
18. "My World Is Empty Without You"
19. "I'm Gonna Let My Heart Do the Walking"
20. "You Keep Me Hangin' On"
- Songs in the Name of Love (2002)
1. "Baby Love"
2. "You Can't Hurry Love"
3. "You Keep Me Hangin' On"
4. "Where Did Our Love Go?"
5. "Stop! In the Name of Love"
6. "Come See About Me"
7. "Up the Ladder to the Roof"
8. "Love Child"
9. "Nathan Jones"
10. "The Happening"
11. "Stoned Love"
12. "Reflections"
13. "Floy Joy"
14. "Automatically Sunshine"
15. "Back in My Arms Again"
16. "Love is Here and Now You're Gone"
17. "My World is Empty Without You"
18. "Sweet Freedom"
19. "How Do You Keep the Music Playing?"
20. "I Hear a Symphony"
- The Best of the Supremes (2002)
1. "Baby Love"
2. "Love Child"
3. "Stop! In the Name Of Love"
4. "Stoned Love"
5. "Nathan Jones"
6. "Crazy 'bout the Guy"
7. "Hit and Miss"
8. "I Want To Be Loved"
9. "Back By Popular Demand"
10. "Your Love Keeps Lifting Me"
11. "I'm Gonna Make You Love Me"
12. "Ain't No Mountain High Enough"
13. "I'm Still Waiting"
14. "Forever Came Today"
15. "How Do you Keep the Music Playing?"
- Stop to Love (2002)
1. "Stop to Love"
2. "Who Do You Love"
3. "Sweet Freedom"
4. "I Still Believe"
5. "Feel Like Makin' Love"
6. "Just Like That"
7. "First Time on a Ferris Wheel"
8. "Never Can Say Goodbye"
9. "Feelin' Alright"
10. "Private Number" - with Edwin Starr
11. "Crumbs Off the Table"
12. "The Colours of Love"
13. "(You Make Me Feel Like A) Natural Woman"
14. "If I Love Again"
15. "How Do You Keep the Music Playing?"
- Scherrie, Lynda, Joyce - New Beginnings (2015)
1. Ain't No Stopping Us Now
2. I Can't Make You Love Me
3. Dance With My Father
4. Band of Gold
- A Supremes Christmas EP (2018)
1. "The Christmas Song"
2. "Oh Holy Night"
3. "Little Drummer Boy"
4. "Have Yourself a Merry Little Christmas"
- Bouncing Back (scheduled for release in 1991; unreleased)
1. "Baby Love"
2. "Stop! In the Name of Love"
3. "Love Child"
4. "Crazy About the Guy"
5. "Stoned Love"
6. "I'm Gonna Make You Love Me" (with the Originals)
7. "I Want to Be Loved"
8. "Back by Popular Demand" (with the Originals)
9. "Hit and Miss"
10. "Nathan Jones"
11. "Your Love Keeps Lifting Me" (with the Originals)

=== Live albums ===
- Live and More (1997)
- Legendary Ladies Live (with the Three Degrees and Sister Sledge) (1997)

Although the three groups above did tour together extensively throughout Europe in 1997 on the same bill, the recordings featured on the above compact disc album were used from three separate projects of previously released live shows from each group, digitally remastered and edited by Steve Weaver.
