= Let Yourself Go =

Let Yourself Go may refer to:

== Albums ==
- Let Yourself Go (Kristin Chenoweth album), 2001
- Let Yourself Go, a 1987 album by Sybil Lynch
- Let Yourself Go: Live at Jordan Hall, a 1999 album by Fred Hersch
- Let Yourself Go: Celebrating Fred Astaire, a 2000 album by Stacey Kent
- Let Yourself Go: The '70s Albums, Vol 2 – 1974–1977: The Final Sessions, compilation album by the Supremes

== Songs ==
- "Let Yourself Go" (808 State song), 1988
- "Let Yourself Go" (Green Day song), 2012
- "Let Yourself Go" (Irving Berlin song), 1936
- "Let Yourself Go" (James Brown song), 1967
- "Let Yourself Go" (Elvis Presley song), 1968
- "Let Yourself Go" (The Supremes song), 1977
- "Let Yourself Go", a 1987 song by Sybil Lynch from her album of the same name
- "Let Yourself Go", a 1978 song by T-Connection from the album On Fire
- "Let Yourself Go", a 2005 song by Smujji from the album True Colours
