= High energy =

High energy may refer to:

- High energy physics, a branch of physics dealing with subatomic particles and ionizing radiation
- Hi-NRG, a genre of uptempo disco or electronic dance music that originated in the United States during the late 1970s and early 1980s.
- High Energy (The Supremes album), 1976
  - "High Energy" (The Supremes song), 1976
- High Energy (Freddie Hubbard album), 1974
- "High Energy" (Evelyn Thomas song), 1984
- High Energy, a 1990s professional wrestling tag team consisting of Owen Hart and Koko B. Ware

== See also ==
- High Inergy
