= Freddi Poole =

American singer

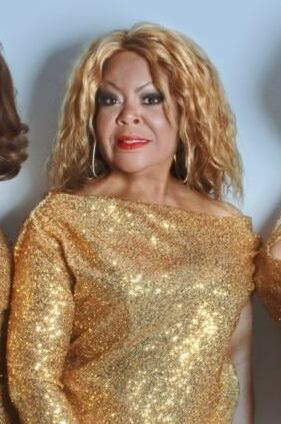
- Pool as part of The Three Degrees

Background information
- Genres: R&B; pop; soul
- Occupation: Singer
- Years active: 1960s–present
- Member of: The Three Degrees
- Formerly of: Former Ladies of the Supremes

Freddi Poole; sometimes billed as Freddie Pool, is an American singer, known best for her work with the Former Ladies of the Supremes and the Three Degrees.

== Biography ==
Raised in Los Angeles, she started singing in the church at the age of four, and got her first recording contract at the age of fourteen with the girl group The Delicates, with Darlene Walton, Billie Rae Calvin and Brenda Joyce Evans who would later become members of the Undisputed Truth.

== Former Ladies of the Supremes ==
In July 1996, Freddi replaced Sundray Tucker in the Former Ladies of the Supremes. In September 2009, it was reported via Scherrie Payne and Lynda Laurence's website that Freddi left the group. She was replaced by Joyce Vincent Wilson, formerly of Tony Orlando and Dawn.

== The Three Degrees ==
In January 2011, Poole replaced Cynthia Garrison in the Three Degrees, who was suffering from Piriformis syndrome and could no longer tour with the group. As of 2025, Poole is still a member of the Three Degrees.

== Discography ==
Freddie Pool - Driving Wheel Records

- The Utrecht Sessions - CD EP - Released March 2014
- Young Hearts Run Free (Radio Mix) - Digital Download Single - Released August 2014
- Young Hearts Run Free (The Remixes) - Digital Download Single - Released March 2015
- I Will Survive - Digital Download Single - Released June 2015
- I Will Survive (Berlin Remixes) - Digital Download Single/Maxi CD - Released January 2017
- Young Hearts Run Free (Rinaldo Montezz Remix) - Digital Download Single - Released November 2018
- I Will Survive (Rinaldo Montezz Freddie Goes To Rio Remix) - Digital Download Single - Released February 2020
