= Partners (Scherrie & Susaye album) =

Studio album by Scherrie & Susaye
- Released: 9 October 1979
- Recorded: 1978–1979
- Studios: Jennifudy North Hollywood, CA); Soundcastle; Los Angeles, CA)
- Genres: R&B, soul, quiet storm, disco
- Labels: Motown; M 920
- Producer: Eugene McDaniels

Partners is a 1979 album by Scherrie & Susaye released on Motown Records. Following the disbanding of the Supremes in 1977, former group members Scherrie Payne and Susaye Greene recorded the album, sharing songwriting, arranging and production duties. Ray Charles performed on "Luvbug" whilst Joyce Vincent Wilson (formerly of Tony Orlando and Dawn) is featured on background vocals.

"Leaving Me Was the Best Thing You've Ever Done" was released as the album's only single. In 2014, the album was re-released on CD and to digital music stores and online streaming services.

== Critical reception ==
Professional ratings
Review scores
Source	Rating
AllMusic	3/5 stars
Bay State Banner	C

In an AllMusic review, Ed Hogan noted 'the overall smooth, intelligent tone of the album', describing Partners as 'a quiet storm precursor'. Hogan expressed "Luvbug" featuring Ray Charles is 'thick and funky' and 'sophisticated slow jams like "You've Been Good to Me," "Another Life From Now," and mellow treats like "In the Night" and "Your Sweet Love" were ahead of their time'. Meanwhile, "Leaving Me Was the Best Thing You've Ever Done" and "I Found Another Love" 'satisfy their dance fans'.

A contemporary Billboard review praised Scherrie & Susaye's 'strong, soulful' vocals and described the album as an 'interesting, if occasionally uneven, package of mostly upbeat songs', citing "Storybook Romance", "Your Sweet Love" and "Luvbug" as the 'best cuts'. The Bay State Banner wrote that "the songs Scherrie (Payne) wrote are standard housewife soul sung by two voices acting as one in the manner of any back-up singers."

In an interview with Blues & Soul, Payne recounted " I remember first meeting Luther Vandross. We were at a session. Quincy Jones called Susaye and me into a session with Luther, James Ingram, and I can't remember who else [...] Luther was so excited to meet Susaye and me, and when he said he loved Partners and just when on and on about it, it really made me feel good.

== Track listing ==
Side one
No.	Title	Writer(s)	Arranger(s)	Length
1.	"Storybook Romance"	Scherrie Payne	Alan Silvestri	5:09
2.	"Your Sweet Love"	Susaye Greene-Brown	Leon Pendarvis, William Reichenbach (Horns)	4:15
3.	"Luvbug" (featuring Ray Charles)	Susaye Greene-Brown	Odell Brown	3:36
4.	"Leaving Me Was the Best Thing You've Ever Done"	Scherrie Payne	Alan Silvestri	5:35
5.	"When the Day Comes Every Night"	Susaye Greene-Brown	Jeremy Lubbock	2:25

Side two
No.	Title	Writer(s)	Arranger(s)	Length
1.	"In the Night"	Ed Brown, Susaye Greene-Brown	Odell Brown, Larry Williams (Horns)	6:12
2.	"I Found Another Love"	Scherrie Payne, Susaye Greene-Brown	Leon Pendarvis, Larry Williams (Horns)	3:07
3.	"You've Been Good to Me"	Scherrie Payne	Alan Silvestri	3:36
4.	"Another Life from Now"	Scherrie Payne	Jeremy Lubbock	5:35

=== Out-takes ===
Several tracks recorded during the sessions for 'Partners' did not make the final cut. These include "We'll Get By", "The Fantasy", "Slow Dance".

== Personnel ==
=== Musicians ===
- Backing Vocals – Scherrie Payne, Susaye Greene-Brown, Allen L. Greene III, Bill Champlin, Carmen Twillie (Arranger), Ed Brown, Gene McDaniels, Jim Gilstrap, Joyce Vincent-Wilson, Kathy Collier, Roy Galloway, Venette Gloud
- Baritone Saxophone, Tenor Saxophone – Kim Hutchcroft
- Bass – Abraham Laboriel, Ed Brown (tracks: "Your Sweet Love", "Luvbug", "In The Night")
- Drums – Steve Schaeffer
- Electric Piano [Fender Rhodes], Piano [Acoustic] – Leon Pendarvis, Randy Waldman
- Guitar – Alan Silvestri, Jeff Mironov
- Percussion – Paulinho Da Costa
- Piano [Acoustic], Synthesizer, Clavinet, Keyboards [Arp] – Odell Brown, Susaye Greene-Brown ("When The Day Comes Every Night")
- Synthesizer – Craig Hundley
- Tenor Saxophone – Gary Herbig
- Tenor Saxophone, Alto Saxophone, Flute – Larry Williams
- Trombone [Alto], Bass Trombone, Tenor Saxophone – William Reichenbach
- Trumpet, Flugelhorn – Gary Grant, Jerry Hey

=== Technical ===
- Arranger, Co-Producer – Scherrie Payne, Susaye Greene-Brown
- Co-producer – Ed Brown
- Concertmaster – Gerald Vinci, Bill Nuttycombe
- Coordinator [Production, Assistant] – Lori Nadlman
- Coordinator [Production] – Cyndi James-Reese
- Engineer [Assistant] – Bill Battrell, Bill Stern, Bino Espinoza, James Warmack
- Executive-Producer – Suzanne de Passe Le Mat
- Mastered By – John Matousek, Russ Terrana
- Mixed By – Milt Calice, Russ Terrana
- Producer – Eugene McDaniels
- Product Manager – Suzanne Coston
- Recorded By – Milt Calice

=== Artwork ===
- Art Direction – John Cabalka
- Calligraphy [Lettering] – Vigon Nahas Vigon
- Design – Ginny Livingston
- Photography By – Claude Mougin

== Singles ==
- "Leaving Me Was the Best Thing You've Ever Done" b/w "When the Day Comes Every Night" (US, CAN - Motown 1473), (UK - TMG 1167), (PRT - IM-26010)
