= Love, I Never Knew You Could Feel So Good =

Single by The Supremes

from the album Mary, Scherrie & Susaye
- B-side: "This Is Why I Believe in You"
- Released: March 1977
- Length: 5:52 (single/album version)
- Label: Motown
- Songwriters: B. Holland, Davis, Brown, Stafford
- Producers: B. Holland, E. Holland

The Supremes singles chronology
"Let Yourself Go" (1977)	"Love, I Never Knew You Could Feel So Good" (1977)

"Love, I Never Knew You Could Feel So Good" is a song by The Supremes. The song was released in the UK in March, 1977 as the third and last single from their album Mary, Scherrie & Susaye. The song is the last official single ever released by The Supremes.

On June 12, 1977, about three months after this single's release, The Supremes performed their final concert together at Theatre Royal, Drury Lane in London, England and the group eventually disbanded.

== Personnel ==
- Lead vocals by Scherrie Payne
- Background vocals by Mary Wilson, Scherrie Payne and Susaye Greene

== Charts ==
Chart (1977)	Peak position
US Dance Club Songs (Billboard)	5
