= You're My Driving Wheel =

- 1976 German single

Single by The Supremes

from the album Mary, Scherrie & Susaye
- B-side: "You're What's Missing in My Life"
- Released: September 30, 1976
- Genre: Dance, disco
- Length: 3:19 (single version); 4:19 (album version); 5:15 (12" version)
- Label: Motown
- Songwriters: Brian Holland; Harold Beatty; Floyd Stafford; Reginald Brown

The Supremes singles chronology
"High Energy" (1976)	"You're My Driving Wheel" (1976)	"Let Yourself Go" (1977)

"You're My Driving Wheel" is a dance/disco song by The Supremes. The song was released on September 30, 1976 as the first single from their album Mary, Scherrie & Susaye. Along with the tracks, "Let Yourself Go" and "Love I Never Knew", "You're My Driving Wheel" peaked at number five on the disco chart. On the Soul chart, the single peaked at number fifty and number eighty-five on the Hot 100. This would be the final single release by The Supremes to enter the Pop charts.

== Charts ==
Chart (1976–1977)	Peak position
US Billboard Hot 100	85
US Dance Club Songs (Billboard)	5
US Hot R&B/Hip-Hop Songs (Billboard)	50
US Cashbox R&B	49
US Record World Disco File Top 20	5
US Record World R&B Singles	46

== Personnel ==
- Lead vocals by Scherrie Payne
- Background vocals by Mary Wilson, Scherrie Payne and Susaye Greene
