= Ira Tucker =

American gospel singer (1925–2008)

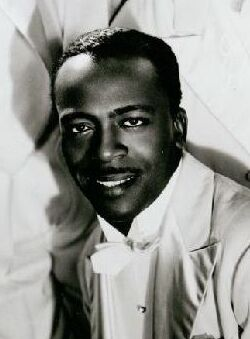
- Tucker in a publicity photo with The Dixie Hummingbirds

Background information
- Born: Ira B. Tucker; May 17, 1925; Spartanburg, South Carolina, U.S.
- Origin: Greenville, South Carolina, U.S.
- Died: June 24, 2008 (aged 83) Philadelphia, U.S.
- Genres: Gospel music
- Occupation: Singer
- Years active: 1938–2008
- Labels: Decca, MCA, Peacock

Ira B. Tucker (May 17, 1925 – June 24, 2008) was the lead singer with the American gospel group The Dixie Hummingbirds. He was with The Dixie Hummingbirds for 70 years, from 1938, when he joined at the age of 13, until his death from cardiovascular disease on June 24, 2008. Tucker is the father of Sundray Tucker, Ira Tucker Jr., and Lynda Laurence, formerly of The Supremes.

Tucker – whose middle initial "stood for nothing" – was born in Spartanburg, South Carolina, and died in Philadelphia.
