= One Million Masterpiece =

The One Million Masterpiece (abbreviated OMM) is the largest artistic collaboration ever attempted. It is an ongoing project to produce a true piece of global artwork. As of October 16, 2007, 26,582 artists from 174 countries have participated, with $19,348.57 raised for charities worldwide.

The original project website was launched on July 14, 2006 by London-based artist Paul Fisher. The site uses an Adobe Flash drawing tool to enable members to contribute images drawn on screen using a mouse or digipad, and an AJAX viewer which displays the whole artwork mosaic.

The website has developed and further social networking elements have been added. Artists can rate one another's contributions, communicate via messages and maintain a profile page.

== Participation ==
Participation is free to anyone with access to the internet. Participants are each given a square where they can use a built-in drawing tool to create an image. (These individual images combined are what will make up the final project as a giant mosaic.) The project is open to, and intended for, all willing participants. One need not be artistically trained, in order to participate.

Celebrity Involvement

Celebrity contributors include Peaches Geldof, electric violinist Linzi Stoppard, playwright Tom Stoppard, doctor and health commentator Miriam Stoppard, Frankie Goes to Hollywood frontman and artist Holly Johnson, cult comedy icon Karl Pilkington, businessman and socialite Sebastien Sainsbury and Supremes band member Susaye Greene.

== Aims ==
Artistic and Charitable

The One Million Masterpiece aims to produce a piece of public artwork that will provide a snapshot of global society. It is intended that the final artwork be completed for unveiling on World Population Day 2008 and hopes to raise over $1 million for the projects charity partners Save the Children, Oxfam, ActionAid and World Cancer Research Fund.

World Record

The artwork also officially qualifies as a new world record. The previous official record for the most artists completing a single picture was held by the painting A Little Dab of Texas, designed by Jim Campbell of Brenham, Texas, United States. The picture was painted by 25,297 people and was completed in 3 years, 7 months on June 14, 1998.

== Recurring Elements Within Image (Space Monkeys) ==
As the project is still underway, it is largely wondered whether the final image will have a thematic unity or if it will be a chaotic series of unrelated images. Many recurring elements can be found throughout the work. The most notable of these recurring elements are what have been dubbed "space monkeys." Space monkeys are small circular faces, typically cartoonish in nature and rudimentary in style. They are believed to have originated within Laura Dixon's picture—but they soon began to appear in pictures throughout the project.

Other common recurring elements include: views of the earth from space, eyes, hearts, and flowers.

== Video Replay of Drawing Process ==
The OMM site's adobe drawing tool includes a feature that enables a video replay of the drawing process for each picture. This feature has led several participants to not only create digital paintings, but also digital videos. Angeli Arndt uses this feature in her artwork entitled "I'm Always Changing For You," to show a human face changing over time. This video functionality adds a dimension to the project that is not noticeable when simply viewing still images of the project.

== Exhibition ==
When completed The One Million Masterpiece will measure 80 metres in width and 31 meters in height and each individual contribution will be a 5 cm by 5 cm square. It is proposed that the final piece will be printed and unveiled in Central London on World Population Day 2008.

== Controversy ==
There has been controversy within the OMM community regarding content of individual artworks. Some participants have complained that certain artworks are pornographic and/or obscene. Occasionally, a participant will demand that the artwork of another participant be deleted.

== Sources ==
- Million artists charity bid - BBC
- Giant mosaic shapes up online - Daily Telegraph
