= Sundray Tucker =

American singer (born 1948)

- Born: March 23, 1948 (age 78); Philadelphia, Pennsylvania, U.S.
- Genres: R&B, Soul
- Occupation: Singer
- Instrument: Vocals
- Years active: 1967–present
- Labels: Peacock; Benn Lee; Veep; Neptune; TK Records; Grace Note Records; Driving Wheel Records

Sundray Tucker (born March 23, 1948) is an American singer.

== Biography ==
Born and raised in Philadelphia, she is the eldest daughter of Ira Tucker (of the Dixie Hummingbirds) and Louise Tucker. Her sister is Lynda Laurence, a former member of the Supremes, and her brother is Ira Tucker Jr. Tucker. Sundray also performed under the name Cindy Scott. Her most notable single was the Northern Soul classic "I Love You Baby", backed with "In Your Spare Time".

In 1960, Tucker was a member of The Ordettes, a group formed by Patti LaBelle which would later become The Blue Belles, then Labelle.

In 1967, Sundray joined the Three Degrees and performed alongside Fayette Pinkney and Sheila Ferguson for touring purposes only.

From 1993 until 1996, Sundray was a member of the Former Ladies of the Supremes along side her sister Lynda, and Sherrie Payne.

== Discography ==
As Sandra Kay Tucker - Peacock Records

- Have It Your Way / I've Got A Good Thing
- Nobody Will (unissued)
- Step By Step (unissued)

As Cindy Scott And The Cousins - Benn Lee Records

- What Are You Doing To Me (unissued)
- I Got News (unissued)
- Lazy Lover (unissued)

As Cindy Scott - Veep Records

- I Love You Baby / In Your Spare Time
- I've Been Loving You Too Long / Time Can Change A Love

As Cindy Scott - Driving Wheel Records

- The Loving Country (Album)
- Live & Red Hot (Album)
- Return To The Loving Country AKA The Loving Country 2 (Album)
- The Loving Country / I've Been Loving You Too Long (7" vinyl)
- In Love Maybe (2009 Radio Mix) / In Love Maybe (Original Version)
- Remember Me EP
- Take Me Higher (2010 Remix)
- Killing Me Softly (2010 Ibiza Mix)
- The Soul of Cindy Scott (Album)
- Life Beats EP
- In Love Maybe: The Remixes
- Loved Up: The Remix Project (Album)
- Saturday Night, Sunday Morning: The Remixes
- Ain't Nothing Like The Real Thing (Restoration Mix)
- The Loving Country - 20th Anniversary Special Edition (Album)
- Life Iza B
- The Loving Country - Live - 20th Anniversary Special Edition (Album)
- The Loving Country, Vol. 2 - Special Edition (Album)
- Fine Time (Rinaldo Montezz Flashback Remix)
- Life Iza B (Rinaldo Montezz Remix)
- Fine Time (Rinaldo Montezz Club Mix)

Duets with Bunny Sigler - Neptune Records

- Sure Didn't Take Long
- We're Only Human
- Conquer The World Together

As Sundray Tucker:

- Do Re Mi (unissued)
- Don't Know How (unissued)
- My Melody (unissued)
- Said What I Said (unissued)
- You Should Rock, You Should Roll (unissued)
- The Last Grand Dance
- Mr Lovin'
- Tutti Frutti
- In Love Maybe (unissued)
- If It Was Me/ Ask Millie - TK Records
- Fancy Dancer (unissued) - TK Records
- Try My Love / Is It Possible - Grace Note Records
- Nervous (unissued)
- If It Was Me - Driving Wheel Records
- Moving on Up (Rinaldo Montezz Funky Drone Mix) - Altair Records
- Moving on Up (Rinaldo Montezz Funky Drone Mix) [Radio Edit] - Altair Records
- Moving on Up (Rinaldo Montezz Funky Drone Dub Mix) [Radio Edit] - Altair Records
- Runaway Love (Rinaldo Montezz Runaway Remix) - Driving Wheel Records
- Remember Me (Rinaldo Montezz Anthem Remix) - Driving Wheel Records
- Signed, Sealed, Delivered I'm Yours (Rinaldo Montezz Gospel Remix) - Driving Wheel Records
- Never Can Say Goodbye (Rinaldo Montezz Remix) - Driving Wheel Records
- Sundray Tucker Megamix - Driving Wheel Records
- If I Were Your Woman (Rinaldo Montezz Summer Breeze Revisited Remix) - Driving Wheel Records
- Moving on Up (Rinaldo Montezz Remix) - Driving Wheel Records
