= Early Morning Love =

Single by The Supremes

from the album The Supremes
- B-side: "Where Is It I Belong"
- Released: November 1975
- Genre: Soul, funk, R&B, disco
- Length: 3:12 (single/album version)
- Label: Motown
- Songwriter(s): Eddie Holland, Harold Beatty
- Producer(s): Brian Holland

The Supremes singles chronology
"Where Do I Go from Here" (1975)	"Early Morning Love" (1975)	"I'm Gonna Let My Heart Do the Walking" (1976)

"Early Morning Love" is a single released by Motown singing group The Supremes. It is the third and final single released from their 1975 self-titled album, The Supremes. This song reached #6 on the Disco Singles chart.

== Personnel ==
- Lead vocals by Mary Wilson
- Background vocals by Scherrie Payne, Mary Wilson and Cindy Birdsong
