= Let Yourself Go (The Supremes song) =

- 1977 German single

Single by The Supremes

from the album Mary, Scherrie & Susaye
- B-side: "You Are the Heart of Me"
- Released: January 25, 1977
- Genre: Dance, Disco
- Length: 4:32 (single/album version)
- Label: Motown
- Songwriter(s): B. Holland, E. Holland, Jr., Harold Beatty
- Producer(s): B. Holland, E. Holland

The Supremes singles chronology
"You're My Driving Wheel" (1976)	"Let Yourself Go" (1977)	"Love, I Never Knew You Could Feel So Good" (1977)

"Let Yourself Go" is a disco song recorded by the Supremes. It was written by Harold Beatty, Eddie Holland and Brian Holland (the latter two formerly part of Motown's hit songwriting team Holland-Dozier-Holland in the 1960s). The song was released on January 25, 1977 as the second single from The Supremes' Mary, Scherrie & Susaye album, and the last one by the group officially released in the US, ever. The song peaked at #83 on the US R&B charts.

== Personnel ==
- Lead vocals by Scherrie Payne
- Background vocals by Mary Wilson, Scherrie Payne and Susaye Greene

== Charts ==
Chart (1977)	Peak position
US Dance Club Songs (Billboard)	5
US Hot R&B/Hip-Hop Songs (Billboard)	83
US Record World Disco File Top 20	5
