= I'm Gonna Let My Heart Do the Walking =

Single by The Supremes

from the album High Energy
- Released: March 16, 1976
- Recorded: 1976
- Genre: Disco, soul
- Length: 3:07 (single version); 3:32 (album version); 4:08 (extended version)
- Label: Motown
- Songwriters: Brian Holland; Eddie Holland
- Producers: Brian Holland; Edward Holland Jr.

The Supremes singles chronology
"Early Morning Love" (1975)	"I'm Gonna Let My Heart Do the Walking" (1976)	"High Energy" (1976)

High Energy track listing
- 7 tracks Side one: 1. "High Energy"; 2. "I'm Gonna Let My Heart Do the Walking"; 3. "Only You (Can Love Me Like You Love Me)"; 4. "You Keep Me Moving On"; Side two: 5. "Don't Let My Teardrops Bother You"; 6. "Till the Boat Sails Away" / "I Don't Want to Lose You"; 7. "You're What's Missing in My Life"

"I'm Gonna Let My Heart Do the Walking" is a disco-styled soul single composed by the Holland brothers Eddie and Brian, members of the former Holland–Dozier–Holland team and was released as a single by Motown vocal group The Supremes in 1976 on the Motown label. It was the first single since "Your Heart Belongs to Me" in 1962 to feature four Supremes. It is also notable for being the last top forty single the group would score before they disbanded in 1977.

== Overview ==
=== Recording ===
By 1976, the Supremes were four years without a top 40 recording and had undergone several line-up changes. After departures from Jean Terrell, Lynda Laurence and Cindy Birdsong, Mary Wilson was determined to keep the group going. After hiring Scherrie Payne, the group found themselves in search of a group member again after Birdsong left the group a second time. Wilson eventually found another former Wonderlove background singer, Susaye Greene to complete the trio.

While all of the tracks of their upcoming release "High Energy" had been completed with Birdsong, Greene was brought in to overdub her vocals on two tracks, among those "I'm Gonna Let My Heart Do the Walking".

=== Reception ===
Released in March 1976, the single caught buzz among the group's disco fan base as well as pop and R&B radio, who had since 1973 been shunning from Supremes singles much or less blamed for the dismal promotion by Motown Records' staff. Because of the return of the Holland brothers to Motown and their reunion with the Supremes, hype was created for the single and it soon led to a rare hit for the group heading into the autumn of their heyday. In the UK, Record Mirror published, 'Still searching for a definite sound maybe it could be high vocals with a shuffling Holland - Dozier rhythm. No, of course it's not, but they're in the country, the vocal delivery is excellent and the BBC playing are it?' The single eventually peaked at number 40 on the Billboard Hot 100, number 25 on the R&B singles chart, and hit number three on Billboard's disco chart. It was also the Supremes' last of thirty-three singles to hit the top 40 nearly thirteen years after first hitting the top 40 with "When the Lovelight Starts Shining Through His Eyes". Despite the Billboard showing, the single charted much lower on the Cash Box and Record World Pop charts.

== Personnel ==
- Lead vocals by Scherrie Payne
- Vocal Ad-Libs by Susaye Greene
- Background vocals by Scherrie Payne, Mary Wilson, Cindy Birdsong
- Produced by Brian Holland and Eddie Holland

== Charts ==
=== Weekly charts ===
Chart (1976)	Peak position
Canada Top Singles (RPM)	53
US Billboard Hot 100	40
US Hot R&B/Hip-Hop Songs (Billboard)	25
US Cashbox Top 100	54
US Cashbox R&B	16
US Record World	56
US Record World Disco File Top 20	3
US Record World R&B	18

=== Year-end charts ===
Chart (1976)	Rank
US Disco Artists (Billboard)	17
US Disco Audience Response (Billboard)	24
