= The Supremes (1975 album) =

Studio album by the Supremes
- Released: May 1975
- Genres: Soul, R&B
- Length: 29:14
- Label: Motown
- Producers: Terry Woodford, Clayton Ivey, Brian Holland, Hal Davis, Greg Wright, Michael Lloyd, Mark Davis

The Supremes chronology
Anthology (1974)	The Supremes (1975)	High Energy (1976)

Singles from The Supremes
- 1. "He's My Man" Released: June 12, 1975; 2. "Where Do I Go from Here" Released: September 5, 1975; 3. "Early Morning Love" Released: November 1975 (UK only)

The Supremes is the twenty-seventh album by the Supremes, released in 1975 on Motown Records. This is the first album to feature Scherrie Payne, who had joined the group in late 1973.

== Track listing ==
=== Side one ===
1. "He's My Man" (Greg Wright, Karin Patterson) – 2:55
2. "Early Morning Love" (Harold Beatty, Brian Holland, Edward Holland, Jr.) – 3:11
3. "Where Is It I Belong" (Samuel Brown, III, Ronald Brown, Elaine Brown) – 3:53
4. "It's All Been Said Before" (Dennis Lambert, Brian Potter) – 2:30
5. "This Is Why I Believe in You" (Michael B. Sutton, Pam Sawyer) – 3:10

=== Side two ===
1. "You Can't Stop a Girl in Love" (Terry Woodford, George Soulé) – 2:31
2. "Color My World Blue" (Frank Johnson) – 2:32
3. "Give Out, But Don't Give Up" (Terry Woodford, Clayton Ivey, Barbara Wyrick) – 2:33
4. "Where Do I Go from Here" (Edward Holland, Jr., Brian Holland) – 3:29
5. "You Turn Me Around" (Barry Mann, Cynthia Weil) – 2:30

== Personnel ==
- Scherrie Payne – lead and backing vocals
- Mary Wilson – lead and backing vocals
- Cindy Birdsong – backing vocals
- Terry Woodford, Clayton Ivey, Brian Holland, Hal Davis, Greg Wright, Michael Lloyd, Mark Davis – producers
- David Blumberg, James Anthony Carmichael, Mark Davis, Oliver Thomas, Arthur Wright, Clayton Ivey, Terry Woodford, Ted Stovall, Gene Page, Paul Riser – arrangers

== Singles history ==
- "He's My Man" b/w "Give Out, But Don't Give Up" (Motown 1358, June 1975)
- "Where Do I Go From Here" b/w "Give Out, But Don't Give Up" (Motown 1374, October 1975)
- "Early Morning Love" b/w "Where Is It I Belong?"(Tamla-Motown 1012, 1975, UK only)

== Chart history ==
Chart (1975)	Peak position
US Billboard 200	152
US Top R&B/Hip-Hop Albums (Billboard)	25
US Cashbox	183
US Record World	179
