= He's My Man =

- 1975 German single

Single by The Supremes

from the album The Supremes
- B-side: "Give Out, But Don't Give Up"
- Released: June 12, 1975
- Genre: R&B, soul, pop
- Length: 2:55 (single/album version); 4:53 (extended version)
- Label: Motown
- Songwriters: Greg Wright; Karin Patterson
- Producer: Greg Wright

The Supremes singles chronology
"Bad Weather" (1973)	"He's My Man" (1975)	"Where Do I Go from Here" (1975)

"He's My Man" is a single released by Motown singing group The Supremes, listed as catalog number M1358F. It is the lead single released from their 1975 self-titled album, The Supremes. The single's peak position was 69 on the US R&B charts, and number-one on the regional Disco charts.

== Critical reception ==
James Hamilton of Record Mirror wrote, 'Already hailed by many as a return to form, this comes - and - goes rhythm plopper ain't the Three Degrees but will please their bank manager.' Cashbox published 'The Supremes don't give you one second of doubt on what may be the hottest r&b, disco, top 40 crossover records to emerge from the Motown camp in recent months. Absolutely inspired production by Greg Wright and arrangements by Dave Blumbert — this disk's got everything, from an incredible, pulsating bass track, rhythm that'll knock you over, and strings that allow those super vocals to come on strong Five stars! Flip: No info, available.

== Charts ==
Chart (1975)	Peak position
US Hot R&B/Hip-Hop Songs (Billboard)	69
US Cashbox R&B	77
US Record World R&B	65

== Personnel ==
- Lead vocals by Mary Wilson and Scherrie Payne
- Background vocals by Cindy Birdsong, Scherrie Payne, and Mary Wilson
