= Where Do I Go from Here (The Supremes song) =

- 1975 Netherlands single

Single by The Supremes

from the album The Supremes
- B-side: "Give Out, But Don't Give Up"
- Released: September 5, 1975
- Genre: Pop, R&B, soul
- Length: 3:08 (single version) 3:30 (album version)
- Label: Motown
- Songwriter(s): E. Holland, Jr., B. Holland

The Supremes singles chronology
"He's My Man" (1975)	"Where Do I Go from Here" (1975)	"Early Morning Love" (1975)

"Where Do I Go from Here" is a single released by Motown singing group The Supremes. It is the second single released from their 1975 self-titled album, The Supremes. The single reached #93 on the US Billboard R&B chart.

== Personnel ==
- Lead vocals by Scherrie Payne
- Background vocals by Mary Wilson, Scherrie Payne and Cindy Birdsong

== Critical reception ==
Cashbox published 'A disco effort from this rich vocal trust. The instruments really overpower the girls here (the mix is strictly aimed at dancers as opposed to listeners), but their able voices still shade the cut remarkably well. Disco. Flip: No info, available.'

== Charts ==
Chart (1975)	Peak position
US Hot R&B/Hip-Hop Songs (Billboard)	93
