= Mary, Scherrie & Susaye =

Studio album by The Supremes
- Released: October 1, 1976
- Recorded: 1976
- Studios: Wally Heider Studio 4; Studio Masters; Barnum Recording Studios; Motown Recording Studios; (Los Angeles)
- Genres: Soul, disco
- Label: Motown
- Producers: Brian Holland, Edward Holland, Jr.

The Supremes chronology
High Energy (1976)	Mary, Scherrie & Susaye (1976)	Diana Ross & the Supremes: 20 Golden Greats (1977)

Singles from Mary, Scherrie & Susaye
- 1. "You're My Driving Wheel" Released: September 30, 1976; 2. "Let Yourself Go" Released: January 25, 1977; 3. "Love, I Never Knew You Could Feel So Good" Released: March 1977

Mary, Scherrie & Susaye is the twenty-ninth and final studio album by The Supremes, released in 1976 on the Motown label. It featured the final line-up for the Supremes, composed of original Supreme Mary Wilson and latter-day members Scherrie Payne and Susaye Greene. All three Supremes take leads on the album. The album was a mixture of disco dance tracks (Hi-NRG) and R&B ballads. Payne and Greene mostly took over the dance tracks while Wilson performed the ballads. The album was released in October 1976, nine months before the trio disbanded.

The entire album was released for the first time on CD on May 17, 2011 on the three-disc set Let Yourself Go: The '70s Albums, Vol 2 – 1974–1977: The Final Sessions.

== Singles ==
Three singles were released from the album, although the final single was only released in the UK. While none of the singles were Top 40 chart hits on the respective national charts, "You're My Driving Wheel" and "Let Yourself Go" became top five singles on the Billboard Hot Dance Club Songs chart.

- "You're My Driving Wheel" b/w "You're What's Missing in My Life" (B-side taken from High Energy) (Motown 1407, September 30, 1976)
- "Let Yourself Go" b/w "You Are the Heart of Me" (Motown 1415, January 25, 1977)
- "Love I Never Knew You Could Feel So Good" b/w "This Is Why I Believe in You" (Tamla-Motown 1064, March 1977, UK only)

== Critical reception ==
Professional ratings
Review scores
Source	Rating
Allmusic	1/5 stars
Cashbox	(Favorable)
Disco Delivery	(Favorable)
DiscoMusic.com	(Favorable)
Record World	(Favorable)

In a contemporary review, Cashbox published:

'Even with personnel changes, The Supremes, remarkably, have managed to maintain their unique sound. This new album was produced by Brian Holland, and he shares a songwriting credit on every tune. “You’re My Driving Wheel” is a dynamite cut that’s just right for al! AM outlets (pop and R&B alike). With such stellar sessionmen as James Gadson and Ben Benay, the record can’t help but be immediately included in The Supremes history of heavy-selling. Ballads are not neglected: “We Should Be Closer Together” will be a top request. Some good disco, too.'

In separate, contemporary reviews, Record World published:

'The combination of Holland-Dozier-Holland and the Supremes has been one that's worked miracles over the years and although Dozier is no longer actively involved, the energy level is just as high as ever. "You're My Driving Wheel," "Let Yourself Go" and "We Should Be Closer Together" are supreme.

'RECOMMENDED ALBUMS: "Mary, Scherrie & Susaye," the new Supremes album (Motown), is terrific, one of the best albums to come out by this ever-changing group since Diana Ross' departure from their ranks. Strongest dance cuts: "Love I Never Knew You Could Feel So Good" (5:51), which is quite speedy, "I Don't Want to Be Tied Down" (4:42), "Let Yourself Go" (4:29), and, of course, "You're My Driving Wheel," already recommended here as a single but a minute longer on the album. Left field, but a possibility because of its great production: "Come Into My Life" (6:14). Production credit goes to Brian Holland, who certainly knows how to take the group to the peak of their talents.'

== Track listing ==
=== Side one ===
1. "You're My Driving Wheel" (Edward Holland, Jr., Brian Holland, Floyd Stafford, Reginald Brown) – 4:20
2. "Sweet Dream Machine" (Harold Beatty, Brian Holland, Edward Holland, Jr.) – 5:22
3. "Let Yourself Go" (Brian Holland, Edward Holland, Jr., Harold Beatty) – 4:29
4. "Come Into My Life" (Brian Holland, Edward Holland, Jr., Richard Davis) – 6:14 (lead singer: Susaye Greene)

=== Side two ===
1. "We Should Be Closer Together" (Janie Bradford, Freddie Gorman, Barbara Gaines, Brian Holland) – 4:59 (lead singer: Mary Wilson)
2. "I Don't Want to Be Tied Down" (Brian Holland, Richard Davis, Edward Holland, Jr.) – 4:42
3. "You Are the Heart of Me" (Michael Lovesmith, Edward Holland, Jr.) – 4:12 (lead singer: Mary Wilson)
4. "Love I Never Knew You Could Feel So Good" (Brian Holland, Richard Davis, Reginald Brown, Floyd Stafford) – 5:51

== Personnel ==
- Mary Wilson – lead and backing vocals
- Scherrie Payne – lead and backing vocals
- Susaye Greene – lead and backing vocals
- Ben Benay, Greg Poree, Jay Graydon – guitar
- Chuck Rainey, Scott Edwards – bass guitar
- Sonny Burke – keyboards
- John Barnes, Dan Wyman – keyboards, synthesizer
- Bob Zimmitti – percussion, synthesizer
- James Gadson – drums
- Eddie "Bongo" Brown, Oliver C. Brown – congas
- Gary Coleman – percussion
- Brian Holland – producer
- Edward Holland, Jr. – executive producer
- Dale Warren, James Anthony Carmichael – arrangers
- Bob Manchurian – assistance on rhythm arrangements

== Charts ==
=== Weekly charts ===
Chart (1976)	Peak position
US Cashbox R&B	73
US Record World	181

=== Year-end charts ===
Chart (1976)	Rank
US Disco Artists (Billboard)	17
US Disco Albums (Record World)	17
US Most Promising Female Group (Record World)	1
US R&B Singles Awards — Top Female Group (Record World)	5
