= Scherrie Payne =

American singer (born 1944)

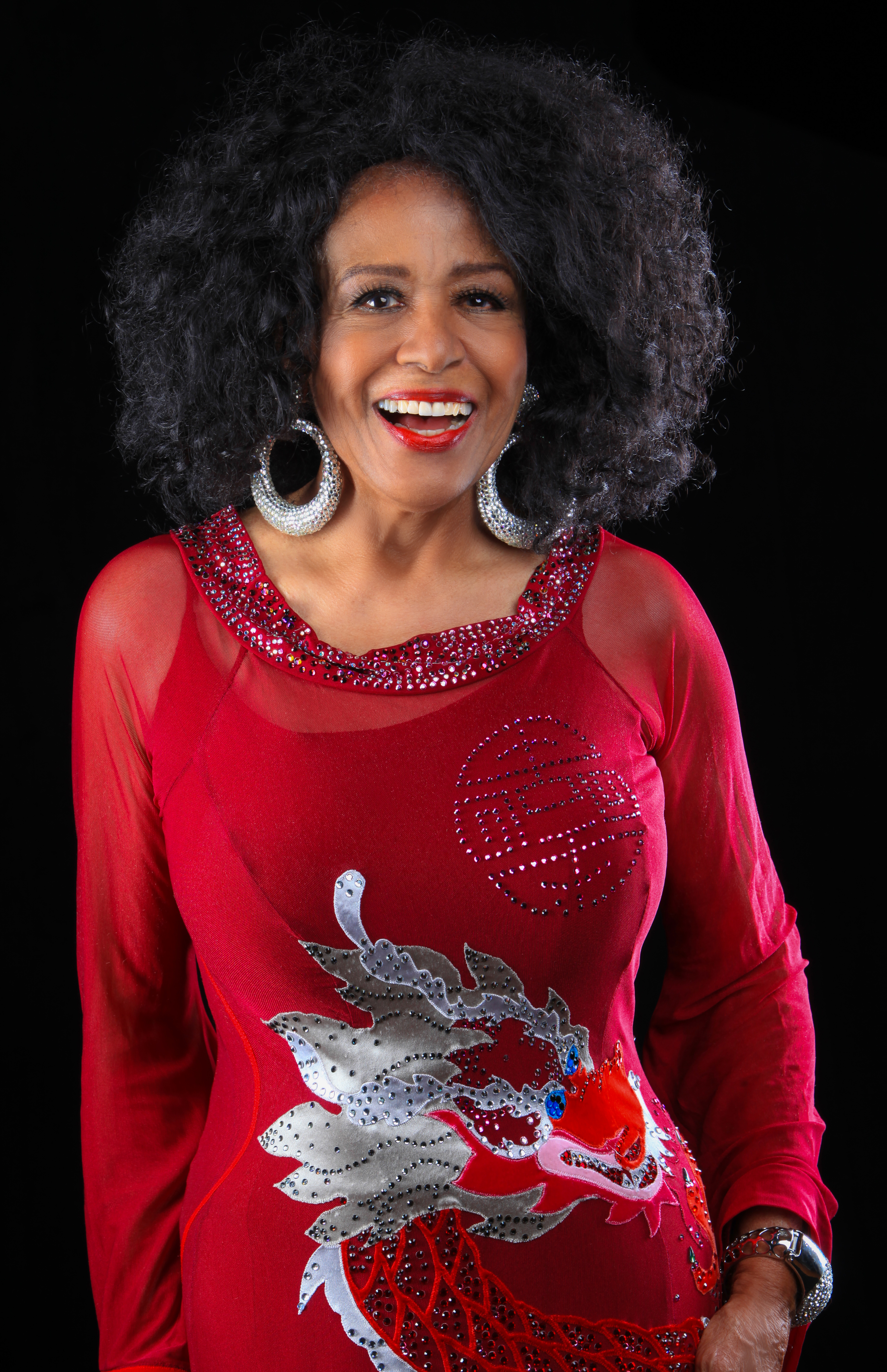
- Payne in 2024

Background information
- Born: Scherrie Ann Payne; November 4, 1944 (age 81); Detroit, Michigan, U.S.
- Genres: R&B; pop; disco; dance-pop
- Occupation: Singer
- Instrument: Vocals
- Years active: 1968–present
- Labels: Invictus; Motown; Motorcity; Altair
- Website: scherrieandsusayeformersupremes.com

Scherrie Ann Payne (born November 4, 1944) is an American singer. Payne is best known as a member and the co-lead singer of the R&B/Soul vocal group the Supremes from 1973 until 1977. Payne is the younger sister of singer Freda Payne. She continues to perform, both as a solo act and as a part of the "Former Ladies of the Supremes" (FLOS). She previously performed as the lead singer of The Glass House.

== Biography ==
=== Early life ===
Scherrie Ann Payne was born on November 4, 1944, to Frederick Payne and Charcle Lee Farley (c. 1920-1977), in Detroit, Michigan. Payne graduated from Central High School in 1961 and from Michigan State University in 1966 with a Bachelor of Science degree. Before she began her music career, she taught at the Grayling School of Observation. In 1964, she appeared on the Jet magazine as queen of the co-educational Cass Hall.

=== The Glass House (1969–1972) ===
Payne began her musical career as the lead singer for the group The Glass House. She performed alongside Ty Hunter (later with The Originals), Pearl Jones, and Larry Mitchell. The group signed with Invictus Records, formed by Motown songwriters Eddie and Brian Holland, and Lamont Dozier, in 1969. Another performer signed with Invictus Records, Honey Cone, had a No. 1 hit with the Glass House song "Want Ads", which originally had Payne on lead vocals, which the Payne sisters suggested to Honey Cone after being unhappy with their own recording. The Glass House saw their biggest hit in 1969 with the Payne-led track "Crumbs Off The Table", which appeared on the Billboard top 10. Between the years of 1970 and 1972, The Glass House released two albums and nine singles, including Payne's solo track "V.I.P.". Record World ranked The Glass House as the fifth 'Top Vocal Combination Group' in their 1970 R&B Awards. None of their subsequent releases saw the same success as their debut, and they disbanded in 1972 after the release of their album "Thanks, I Needed That."

=== The Supremes (1973–1977) ===
After The Glass House disbanded, Payne joined the Supremes and performed as the lead singer, with Mary Wilson and Cindy Birdsong as background singers. Payne often remained quiet during interviews with the group and was often asked about her predecessor as lead singer of the Supremes, Diana Ross, even years later. Payne sang lead on the single "He's My Man" and "It's All Been Said Before", both taken from the album The Supremes. Payne was never able to write any material for The Supremes, which reportedly disappointed her.

Payne felt that Motown did not really care as much about the Supremes as they had in the 1960s, due to the changing musical tastes of the era. Her contributions moved The Supremes toward the disco era with songs like "I'm Gonna Let My Heart Do the Walking", "You're My Driving Wheel", "Let Yourself Go", and "Love I Never Knew You Could Feel So Good". While each of these disco songs landed in the Billboard Dance Top Ten, they did not perform as well on the pop and R&B charts. The single "I'm Gonna Let My Heart Do The Walking" was a No. 3 hit on the Disco chart, rose in the Billboard Top 40 to No. 25 on the R&B chart, and No. 40 on the Pop chart.

The final three members of the Supremes (Payne, Wilson and Susaye Greene) officially disbanded in 1977 with a farewell concert in London after Wilson, the last remaining founding member, announced that she would embark on a solo career. Payne and Greene tried to recruit a new third member, Joyce Vincent Wilson of Tony Orlando and Dawn, but Motown responded with that the Supremes would not continue with original members. Motown officially retired the Supremes in 1977, but offered Payne and Greene a contract to record as a duet. During this time, Payne released the solo single "Fly" b/w "When I Look at Your Face" in late 1977. As a duet, Partners, under the name "Scherrie and Susaye" was released in 1979. The album received mixed reviews and the two decided to part in order to embark on solo projects.

=== Former Ladies of the Supremes ===
In 1986, Payne joined former members of the Supremes, Jean Terrell and briefly, Cindy Birdsong, to form The Former Ladies Of The Supremes, also called FLOS. When Birdsong left to pursue a solo career, Lynda Laurence took her place and they renamed themselves "Jean, Scherrie, & Lynda of the Supremes", recording the single "We're Back', featuring Ali-Ollie Woodson of the Temptations. They performed through the 1980s and the 1990s. When Terrell departed, they continued with Laurence's sister Sundray Tucker, who was a former member of Stevie Wonder's back-up group, Wonder Love. This lineup worked with British record producer Steve Weaver, resulting in a catalogue of 40 new recordings, some of them re-recordings of the Supremes' original hits. Payne and Laurence continued to tour under the FLOS name with third new member Freddi Poole, who joined the group in 1996 to replace Sundray Tucker. In 2000, Payne and Laurence backed Ross on the Return To Love Supremes reunion tour, in which Ross allowed each of them to lead one of the classic Supremes songs. The group celebrated their 20th anniversary in 2006 (with Birdsong, Tucker and Greene in the audience), and around this time began using the group name "Scherrie & Lynda of the Supremes". In September 2009, Vincent joined Payne and Laurence in the group, replacing Freddi Poole, who departed to join the Three Degrees. In 2017, Laurence left the group after 31 years with her tenure in the group, and was replaced by Greene. In 2024, Greene departed, and Laurence returned. As of 2025, FLOS is still active with a lineup of Payne, Laurence, and Vincent.

=== Solo work ===
As a solo artist, in addition to "V.I.P.", which she recorded while a member of The Glass House and was featured on their second album, Payne has had club hits, such as a cover version of 10cc's "I'm Not In Love" (featuring her sister [Freda], Edmund Sylvers, and Wilson on backing vocals) in 1982, followed two years later by "One Night Only", a song from Act II of the musical "Dreamgirls", which is a musical based loosely on the history of the Supremes and the advancing of the Motown sound into the disco era. The 12" Megatone Label Disco Single also featured Birdsong on background vocals. Both songs were produced by Rick Gianatos, whom Payne currently records with. Payne recorded a solo album for Superstar International Records which contained several duets with Phillip Ingram. The following year, Payne signed with British producer Ian Levine for his Motown reunion project, Motorcity Records. While with Ian, Payne released two solo singles "Chasing Me Into Somebody Else's Arms" (which was originally recorded in 1979 with Levine and Gianatos) and "Pure Energy" (co-written by Payne and released on Nightmare Records), as well as covers of two of Ross' songs, "Ain't No Mountain High Enough" and "I'm Still Waiting". Other product recorded for Motorcity included "Who's Wrong, Who's Right"; "Hit & Miss"; and "One More Time."

=== Later career ===
In August 2001, Payne was invited to perform at the annual open-air festival Sunset Junction Street Fair in Los Angeles. She performed Supremes' classics such as "Stoned Love" and "My World Is Empty Without You" in addition to her own solo hits, "I'm Not In Love" and "Another Life From Now". She made a return to performing at Sunset Junction the following year, performing a similar set. On January 14, 2007, Payne was the special guest star at the "If My Friends Could See Me Now" fund-raiser in Los Angeles, California. She performed her previous hit "One Night Only", from the musical Dreamgirls. Backing her were long-time friends Pam and Joyce Vincent. In 2012, Payne (along with longtime producer Rick Gianatos) recorded and released a version of the Supremes hit "Let Yourself Go" along with a music video. In late 2013, Payne lent her vocals to the Pattie Brooks single "I Like The Way You Move"; she can be seen in the accompanying video as one of the judges. On July 5, 2014, Payne along with Greene performed at the Sheraton in Los Angeles a concert program based on their album "Partners" which was released by Motown in 1979. They were subsequently featured in the magazine Daeida, with a photo shoot; the accompanying article chronicled her career with the Supremes and separately, as well as the re-release of their "Partners" album on CD.

In 2023, Payne was inducted into the Women Songwriters Hall of Fame.

== Personal life ==
Payne dated songwriter Lamont Dozier from 1973 to 1977. She was also rumored to be in a relationship with Lawrence McCutcheon. Later, she dated Ronnie Phillips (d. 2003). Together they have one daughter, Shoshanna Payne-Phillips (b. 1985). Phillips was the owner of the Dangerous Records label.

== Discography ==
=== Albums ===
With The Glass House

List of albums, with selected details
Title	Album details
Inside the Glass House	Released: 1971; Label: Invictus Records; Format: LP, CD
Thanks, I Needed That	Released: 1972; Label: Invictus Records; Format: LP, CD

With The Supremes

List of albums, with selected chart positions and certificationsAll records released on Motown Records.
Title	Album details	Peak chart positions			
Title	Album details	US	US R&B /HH	US Record World	CAN
The Supremes	Released: May, 1975; Label: Motown (M6 828S1); Format: LP, cassette	152	25	179	—
High Energy	Released: April, 1976; Label: Motown (M6 863S1); Format: LP, 8-track, cassette	42	24	141	26
Mary, Scherrie & Susaye	Released: October, 1976; Label: Motown (M6 873S1); Format: LP	—	—	181	—
"—" denotes the album failed to chart or was not released

With the Former Ladies of the Supremes

List of albums, with selected details
Title	Album details
Supremely Yours	Released: 1995; Label: Reflections Records; Format: LP, CD
Supreme Voices	Released: 1997; Label: Platinum Music; Format: LP, CD

as lead artist

List of albums, with selected details
Title	Album details
Bande Originale Du Film "Moi Fleur Bleue" (with Jodie Foster)	Released: 1977; Label: Marcy Music; Format: LP
Partners (with Susaye Greene)	Released: 1979; Label: Motown Records; Format: LP, CD, digital download
Incredible	Released: 1987; Label: Superstar International Records; Format: LP, CD, digital download
The Best of Driving Wheel Records: Millennium Mixes, Vol. 1 (with Lynda Lawrence and Sundray Tucker)	Released: 2000; Format: CD
Vintage Scherrie, Vol. 1 : Remember Who You Are	Released: 15 July 2016; Label: Altair Records, RGP Entertainment Group, Inc.; Format: CD, digital download

=== Singles ===
==== with The Glass House ====
List of singles, released with The Glass House, with selected chart positionsAll records released on Invictus Records
A-side title	Year	Peak chart positions					Album
A-side title	Year	US	US Record World	US R&B /HH	US Record World R&B	CAN	Album
"Crumbs Off the Table"	1969	59	54	7	5	51	Inside the Glass House
"I Can't Be You (You Can't Be Me)"	1970	90	—	33	32	—	Inside the Glass House
"Stealing Moments From Another Woman's Life" /"If It Ain't Love, It Don't Matter"	1970	—	—	44	29	—	Thanks I Needed That /Inside the Glass House
"Stealing Moments from Another Woman's Life"	1971	—	—	42	—	—	Thanks I Needed That
"Touch Me Jesus"	1971	—	—	—	—	—	Inside the Glass House
"Look What We've Done to Love"	1971	—	139	31	35	—	Inside the Glass House
"Playing Games"	1972	—	—	—	—	—	Thanks I Needed That
"Giving Up the Ring"	1972	—	—	—	—	—	Thanks I Needed That
"VIP"	1972	—	—	—	—	—	Thanks I Needed That
"Thanks, I Needed That"	1972	—	—	47	44	—	Thanks I Needed That
"—" denotes the single failed to chart or was not released

==== with The Supremes ====
List of singles, released with The Supremes, with selected chart positionsAll records released on Motown Records
A-side title B-side title	Year	Peak chart positions							Album
A-side title B-side title	Year	US	US Cashbox	US Record World	US R&B /HH	US Record World R&B	US Dance	CAN	Album
"He's My Man" "Give Out, But Don't Give Up"	1975	—	—	—	69	65	1	—	The Supremes
"Where Do I Go from Here" "Give Out, But Don't Give Up"	1975	—	—	—	93	—	—	—	The Supremes
"Early Morning Love" ^{1} "Where Is It I Belong"	1975	—	—	—	—	—	—	—	The Supremes
"I'm Gonna Let My Heart Do the Walking"^{2} "Early Morning Love"^{4}	1976	40	54	56	25	18	3	53	High Energy
"High Energy"^{3} "High Energy"	1976	—	—	—	—	—	3	—	High Energy
"You're My Driving Wheel" "You're What's Missing in My Life"	1976	85	—	—	50	46	5	—	Mary, Scherrie & Susaye
"Let Yourself Go" "You Are the Heart of Me"^{4}	1977	—	—	—	83	—	5	—	Mary, Scherrie & Susaye
"Love, I Never Knew You Could Feel So Good" "This Is Why I Believe in You"^{5}	1977	—	—	—	—	—	5	—	Mary, Scherrie & Susaye
"—" denotes the single failed to chart or was not released

- ^{1} Both sides features lead vocal by Mary Wilson.
- ^{2} Lead vocals by Scherrie Payne and Susaye Greene.
- ^{3} Lead vocal by Susaye Greene.
- ^{4} Lead vocal by Mary Wilson.
- ^{5} Leads vocal by Mary Wilson and Scherrie Payne.

==== as lead and featured artist ====
List of singles, as lead and featured artist, with selected chart positions
A-side title	Year	Peak chart positions				Album
A-side title	Year	US R&B /HH	US Dance	UK	UK Disco	Album
"V.I.P."	1972	—	—	—	—	Thanks I Needed That
"Fly"	1978	—	—	—	—	Non album single
"I'm Not In Love/Girl, You're In Love"	1982	—	35	111	21	Non album single
"One Night Only"	1984	—	41	—	—	Non album single
"L.A. Street Scene (It's A Jubilee)" (Donny Osmond featuring Phillip Ingram, Scherrie Payne & Freda Payne)	1985	—	—	—	—	Non album single
"On And On" (with Phillip Ingram)	1986	—	—	—	—	Incredible
"Chasing Me Into Somebody Else's Arms"	1986	—	—	—	—	Non album single
"The Right Stuff"	1986	—	—	—	—	Incredible
"Incredible" (with Phillip Ingram)	1987	57	—	—	—	Incredible
"Testify"	1987	67	—	—	—	Incredible
"Pure Energy"	1989	—	—	—	—	Non album single
"Back By Popular Demand" (with Jean Terrell & Lynda Laurence - Formerly Of The Supremes Together w/ The Originals)	1991	—	—	—	—	Non album single
"Stoned Love" (with Jean Terrell & Lynda Laurence)	1993	—	—	—	—	Non album single
"One Night Only 2007"	2007	—	—	—	—	Non album single
"Let Yourself Go"	2012	—	—	—	—	Vintage Scherrie, Vol. 1 : Remember Who You Are
"Remember Who You Are"	2016	—	—	—	—	Vintage Scherrie, Vol. 1 : Remember Who You Are
"You Are" (with Sam Green)	2018	—	—	—	—	Non album single
"Unconditional Love"	2019	—	—	—	—	Non album single
"—" denotes the single failed to chart or was not released

== Collaborations ==
Payne has loaned her vocals as backing vocalist to many established performers, including her sister Freda Payne, on the following listed albums:

- Supernatural High - Freda Payne (Payne appears alongside her sister on the song "Storybook Romance", which she composed; she recorded this herself a year later for the Partners album with Susaye Greene)
- An Evening With Freda Payne: Live In Concert - Freda Payne
- It's Your Night - James Ingram
- Bickram's Lounge - Bickram Choudray
- Late at Night - Billy Preston
- Light Up Your Night - The Brothers Johnson
- Calling - Noel Pointer

== Songwriting ==
Payne has composed a musical entitled Ten Good Years, from which the song "Another Life from Now" was taken; the song features on the Partners album and remains a staple part of her rare solo concerts. Songs she has composed or contributed to include:

- "Now Is the Time to Say Goodbye" (written for and recorded by her sister Freda Payne)
- "Storybook Romance"
- "Leaving Me Was the Best Thing You've Ever Done" (co-written by Payne and Susaye Greene and included on their album Partners)
- "I Found Another Love"
- "You've Been Good to Me"
- "Another Life from Now"
- "Pure Energy"
- "Who's Wrong, Who's Right"
- "Don't Rock My World"
- "Keep On Loving Me"
- "Sisters United (We're Taking Control)"
- "Light the World (With the Flame of Love)" (co-written by FLOS member Lynda Laurence)
- "Crumbs Off the Table"
- "The Fox"
- "Hotel"
- "Horse and Rider"
- "Let It Flow"
- "Hit and Miss"
- "Your Love (Keeps Lifting Me)"
