= High Energy (The Supremes album) =

Studio album by the Supremes
- Released: 1 April 1976
- Genres: Soul, disco
- Length: 32:35
- Label: Motown
- Producers: Brian Holland, Edward Holland, Jr.

The Supremes chronology
The Supremes (1975)	High Energy (1976)	Mary, Scherrie & Susaye (1976)

Singles from High Energy
- 1. "I'm Gonna Let My Heart Do the Walking" Released: March 16, 1976; 2. "High Energy" Released: April 1976

High Energy is the twenty-eighth studio album by American girl group the Supremes, released in 1976 on the Motown label. The album is the first to feature Susaye Greene; former member of Stevie Wonder's Wonderlove;, the last album to feature vocals from longtime member Cindy Birdsong, and is notable for featuring the last Billboard Hot 100 Top 40 pop hit for the group, "I'm Gonna Let My Heart Do the Walking". Of their 1970s releases, High Energy is the second-highest charting album on the US Billboard 200, the first being Right On (1970). In Canada, High Energy is the highest-charting Supremes album since TCB (1968).

== Overview ==
The entire album was released for the first time on CD on May 17, 2011, on the three-disc set, Let Yourself Go: The '70s Albums, Vol 2 – 1974–1977: The Final Sessions, which also includes the complete album in a different mix by Russ Terrana. The set also includes alternate versions, including; a Wilson-led version of "You’re What’s Missing In My Life", a Payne-led "You’re What’s Missing In My Life" and a Greene-led "I’m Gonna Let My Heart Do The Walking".

== Critical reception ==
Professional ratings
Review scores
Source	Rating
AllMusic	3/5 stars
Cashbox	(Favorable)
Record World	(Favorable)
The Rolling Stone Album Guide	2/5 stars

In a contemporary review Cashbox published:

'The Supremes have developed a strong reputation for being number one in the field of sweet soul music and "High Energy" only serves to strengthen and broaden that reputation. The album is a pleasing offering of disco. soul and balladry that should find a universal appeal within the r&b. pop and MOR markets. The immaculate production is a tribute to the work of Brian Holland the strings are full and clean — the entire rhythm section tight and punchy. Prime AM material includes the disco feel of "I'm Gonna Let My Heart Do The Walking" and "You're What's Missing In My Life." The Supremes' gentle touch with a ballad should not be overlooked. "Till The Boat Sails Away" is a case in point.'

In a contemporary review for Record World, Vince Aletti writes:

'The Supremes' "High Energy" (Motown) is their glossiest and most satisfying album in some time. Like The Temptations, the Supremes are usually referred to as an "institution," a euphemism for a group that has gone through multiple personnel changes. But the myth, the spirit and Mary Wilson remain and all feel a lot fresher under the direction of Brian Holland, who produced, and Eddie Holland, executive producer; it's almost like old times again. The prime cut, already on two top 10 lists this week (Tony Smith's from Barefoot Boy and Richie Kaczor's from the new Top Floor), is "I'm Gonna Let My Heart Do the Walkin," a sassy, exhilerating song that sounds like a natural single. The title cut, with its shimmering, slow instrumental build-up, is the album's show piece production number, a beautiful job, and three other upbeat cuts—"You're What's Missing in My Life", "Only You (Can Love Me Like You Love Me)" and "You Keep Me Moving On"—should be tested out too'

John Lowe of AllMusic, similarly writes, High Energy is, 'Perhaps the most vigorous (and best) album of their latter-day career', helped by Brian and Eddie Holland at 'the production helm', Scherrie Payne's establishment 'as the centerpiece of the group' and Susaye Greene's 'multi-octative-voiced [...] though producers used her voice more for coloration than for substance.' Lowe describes the album as 'sturdy' and 'dance-oriented [...] highlighted by the hard-driving dance hit "I'm Gonna Let My Heart Do the Walking," which became their last Top 40 hit in 1976.'

== Commercial response ==
Cashbox published in their July 17, 1976 issue, 'The Supremes album “High Energy," and single, "I'm Gonna Let My Heart Do The Walking" are national break-outs, with tremendous sales claimed on the East Coast.'

== Track listing ==
=== Side one ===
1. "High Energy" (Harold Beatty, Brian Holland, Edward Holland, Jr.) - 5:25
2. "I'm Gonna Let My Heart Do the Walking" (Harold Beatty, Brian Holland, Edward Holland, Jr.) - 3:33
3. "Only You (Can Love Me Like You Love Me)" (Harold Beatty, Brian Holland, Edward Holland, Jr.) - 3:04
4. "You Keep Me Moving On" (Brian Holland, Edward Holland, Jr., Richard Davis, Hugh Wyche) - 3:35

=== Side two ===
1. "Don't Let My Teardrops Bother You" (Brian Holland, Lamont Dozier, Edward Holland, Jr., Richard "Popcorn" Wylie) - 4:59
2. "Till the Boat Sails Away" (Barry Payne, Harold Beatty, Brian Holland, Edward Holland, Jr.) - 4:33
3. "I Don't Want To Lose You" (Thom Bell, Linda Creed) - 3:30
4. "You're What's Missing in My Life" (Harold Beatty, Brian Holland, Edward Holland, Jr.) - 3:56

== Personnel ==
- Scherrie Payne - lead ("I'm Gonna Let My Heart Do the Walking", "Only You (Can Love Me Like You Love Me)", "You Keep Me Moving On", "You're What's Missing in My Life") and backing vocals
- Mary Wilson - lead ("Don't Let My Teardrops Bother You", "Till the Boat Sails Away", "I Don't Want to Lose You", "You're What's Missing in My Life" Spoken Intro on High Energy) and backing vocals.
- Susaye Greene - lead ("High Energy", ad-libs on "I'm Gonna Let My Heart Do The Walking") and backing vocals on "I Don't Want to Lose You".
- Cindy Birdsong - backing vocals
- Ben Benay, Melvin Ragin, Ray Parker Jr. - guitar
- Henry Davis, Julius Wechter - bass
- Clarence McDonald, Joe Sample, John Barnes - keyboards
- James Gadson - drums
- Eddie "Bongo" Brown - congas
- Bob Zimmitti, Gary Coleman - percussion
- Brian Holland - producer
- Edward Holland, Jr. - executive producer
- Dale Warren - arranger, conductor

== Charts ==
=== Weekly charts ===
Chart (1976)	Peak position
Canada Top Albums/CDs (RPM)	26
US Billboard 200	42
US Top R&B/Hip-Hop Albums (Billboard)	24
US Cashbox	109
US Cashbox R&B	29
US Record World	141

=== Year-end charts ===
Chart (1976)	Rank
US Disco Artists (Billboard)	17
US Most Promising Female Group (Record World)	1
US R&B Singles Awards — Top Female Group (Record World)	5
