= High Energy (The Supremes song) =

Single by The Supremes

from the album High Energy
- Released: April 18, 1976
- Genre: Dance; disco
- Length: 5:25 (single/album version)
- Label: Motown
- Songwriters: Harold Beatty; Brian Holland; Edward Holland, Jr.
- Producers: Brian Holland and Edward Holland, Jr.

The Supremes singles chronology
"I'm Gonna Let My Heart Do the Walking" (1976)	"High Energy" (1976)	"You're My Driving Wheel" (1976)

High Energy track listing
- 7 tracks Side one: 1. "High Energy"; 2. "I'm Gonna Let My Heart Do the Walking"; 3. "Only You (Can Love Me Like You Love Me)"; 4. "You Keep Me Moving On"; Side two: 5. "Don't Let My Teardrops Bother You"; 6. "Till the Boat Sails Away" / "I Don't Want to Lose You"; 7. "You're What's Missing in My Life"

"High Energy" is a dance/disco song by The Supremes. Released as the album's title-track single in 1976 from their penultimate album High Energy, this energic, sound-bursting tune featured lead vocals by Susaye Greene. Greene, new to the group, was brought in to dub her vocals although Scherrie Payne had already recorded lead vocals prior to Greene's entry into the trio. As such, this was the final single to feature former member Cindy Birdsong's vocals, and the sixth and final single of the group to feature four members. Written by Harold Beatty, Brian Holland and Edward Holland, Jr., the song peaked at position nine on the dance/disco charts later that same year.

== Personnel ==
- Lead vocals by Susaye Greene
- Background vocals by Mary Wilson, Cindy Birdsong and Scherrie Payne

== Chart history ==
Chart (1976)	Peak position
US Billboard Hot Dance/Disco Songs	9
