= Susaye Greene =

American singer (born 1948)

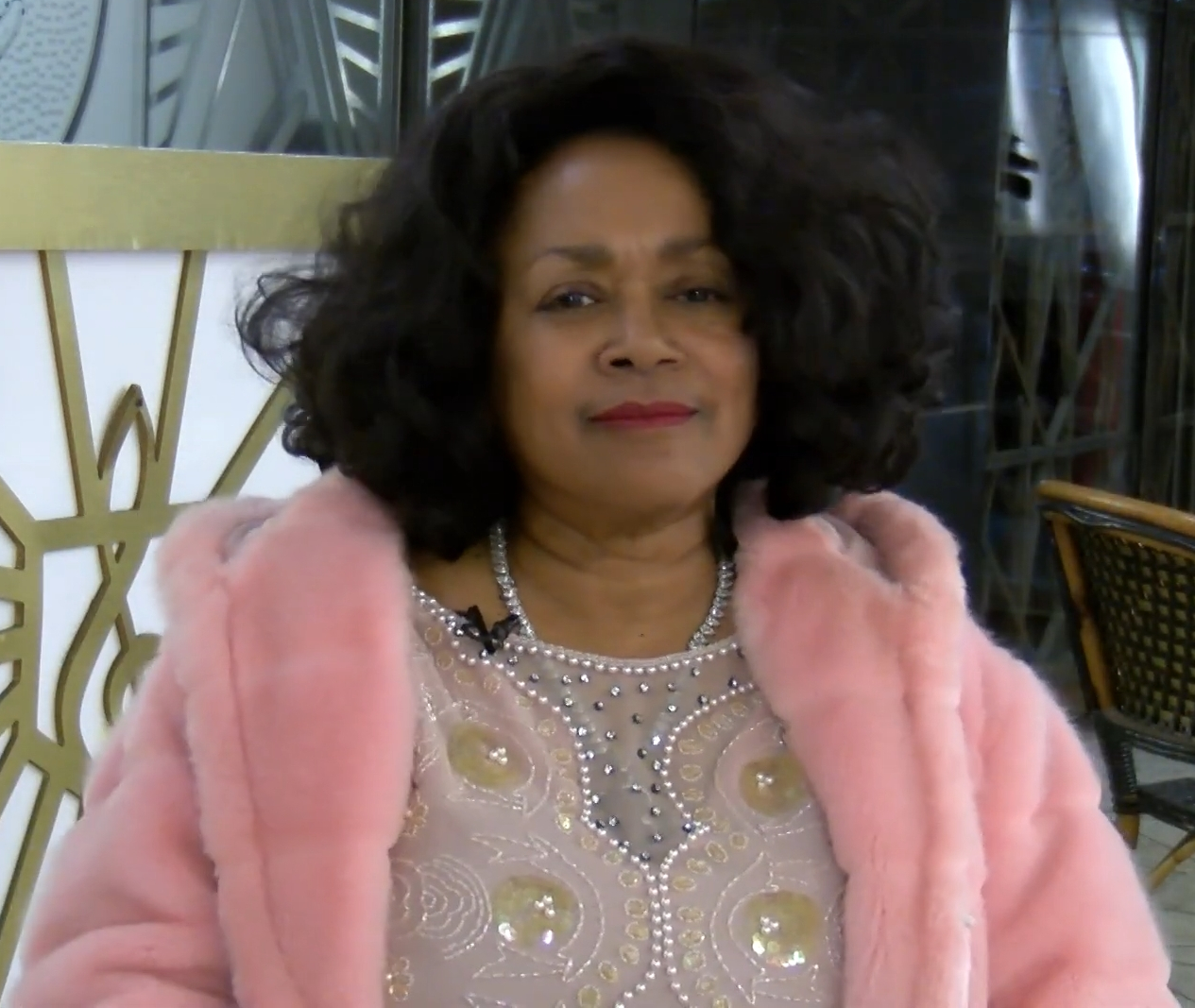
- Greene, 2019.

Background information
- Born: September 13, 1950 (age 76); Houston, Texas, U.S.
- Origin: New York City, New York, U.S.
- Genres: R&B; pop; disco; dance-pop
- Occupations: Singer; songwriter
- Years active: 1966–present
- Labels: Motown; Motorcity
- Website: scherrieandsusayeformersupremes.com

Susaye Greene (born September 13, 1950) is an American singer and songwriter. She was the last official member to join the Motown girl group The Supremes, remaining in the group during its final year of existence from 1976 to 1977. She is a successful songwriter as well, having written hit records for Michael Jackson, Deniece Williams, and others.

== Biography ==
=== Early life and career ===
Born in Houston, Texas, Greene began her professional career at age 12. As a teenager, she moved to New York City where she attended Professional Children School, graduating in 1966 and later from the New York City High School of Performing Arts, and appeared in various commercials. Prior to joining The Supremes, Greene sang with Ray Charles' Raelettes and Stevie Wonder's Wonderlove, which paired her with Deniece Williams and Shirley Brewer. In 1973 she sang lead as a guest vocalist on New Birth's hit "Until It's Time for You to Go" (a cover of Buffy Sainte-Marie's song). In 1975 she co-wrote "Free", Williams' breakthrough single.

=== The Supremes ===
Greene was a member of The Supremes from February 1976 to June 1977 (replacing Cindy Birdsong), and performed on their last two albums, High Energy and Mary, Scherrie & Susaye. Working alongside original member Mary Wilson and Scherrie Payne, Greene quickly found her niche in the group and amongst the group's legions of fans. Greene took lead on "He Ain't Heavy, He's My Brother," in the group's live shows, which never failed to garner a standing ovation, and recorded "High Energy", the title song from the High Energy album. On June 12, 1977, the Supremes performed their farewell concert at the Drury Lane Theater in London and disbanded.

=== After The Supremes ===
In 1979, two years after The Supremes disbanded, Greene recorded a duet album with Payne entitled Partners under the name "Scherrie & Susaye". She also hosted her own cable television show, Hollywood Hot, and continued writing for various artists. One of her most noteworthy compositions was the track "I Can't Help It", co-written with Stevie Wonder for Michael Jackson's Off the Wall.

While touring England in 1984 with Wonder, Greene met her present husband in London and relocated there. In 1986, she sang lead on jazz saxophonist Courtney Pine's single "Children of the Ghetto" from his album Journey to the Urge Within, which England's Jazzwise magazine listed in "100 Jazz albums that shook the world". Though she never signed with Ian Levine's Motorcity label, based in the United Kingdom, in 1989, she released two solo singles on Motorcity – "Stop, I Need You Now" in 1990, and her own version of "Free" in 1991. She also recorded the duet "It's Impossible" with Billy Eckstine. An unreleased demo recording of "Don't Pity The Fool" also exists, although no vocals were added. On July 5, 2014, Greene, along with Payne performed at the Sheraton in Los Angeles a concert program based on their album Partners which was released by Motown in 1979. They were featured in the magazine Daeida, with a photo shoot. The article chronicled career highlights with the Supremes and separately and the re-release of their Partners album on CD.

In October 2017, Greene joined the Former Ladies of the Supremes alongside Payne and Joyce Vincent Wilson.

After leaving the group to further her creative pursuits, Greene has become a three-time number 1 international best selling author, joining the Radical Company publisher's group with Jessica Hughes, Andrew Groelinger and Jason Friedman. Greene has become CEO of "Your Supreme Confidence LLC", to further her public speaking and media training, and wrote a short book The Hater Blocker's Handbook.

=== Solo albums ===
Around the turn of the new millennium, Greene moved back to the United States, and in 2002, she finally released her first solo album, No Fear Here. Two singles and a video were released to critical acclaim. Greene penned most of the album herself. Greene released her second solo album, Brave New Shoes, in 2005.

== Album appearances ==
- High Energy – with The Supremes
- Mary, Scherrie & Susaye – with The Supremes
- At Their Best – with The Supremes
- Partners – duet album with former Supreme Scherrie Payne
- Songs in the Key of Life – Stevie Wonder (background vocals)
- Hotter than July – Stevie Wonder (background vocals)
- Journey to the Urge Within – Courtney Pine (Lead vocals on "Children of The Ghetto", 1986)
- Vital Blue – Blue Mitchell (Mainstream, 1971)

== Songwriting credits ==
- "Free" – Deniece Williams
- "Stop! I Need You Now"
- "No Fear Here"
- "Bewitched"
- "I Can't Help It" – included in Michael Jackson's 1979 release Off the Wall; later included in Pebbles 1995 release, "Straight from My Heart". Also Davina in 1998.

== Filmography ==
Year	Film	Role
2013	20 Feet from Stardom	Herself

== Presence in the online artistic community ==
Greene is also a member of the world's largest online art community, DeviantArt. She joined DeviantArt on September 17, 2004, under the pseudonym "supremextreme". On September 21, 2005, Greene was featured on DeviantArt's on-site chat network, "dAmn", for one of the community's regularly sponsored "Featured Chats". She interacted with members of the DeviantArt community-at-large, answering questions about her life, career, inspirations, motivations, and her time on the art site itself. Greene continues to be an active member on DeviantArt and is preparing 3D images of her Supremextreme character for her first short animated feature film. She is also a key figure in The one million masterpiece charity project, an online arts event aiming to raise over $6 million for global causes. Greene is heavily involved in the marketing of the project to the artistic community.

== Personal life ==
Greene was married to Ed Brown; together they owned a company called "Mud", a mixture of their colorful names, Brown and Greene. Greene is married to Stephen Coton; they have one son, Daniel.
